= Mortuary temple of Hatshepsut =

Ancient Egyptian temple

Mortuary temple of Hatshepsut Djeser-Djeseru
D45 D45 G43 O1
(Note: This is one of many recorded renderings of Ḏsr-ḏsrw. This particular rendering appears in the Hathor and Amun shrines.)
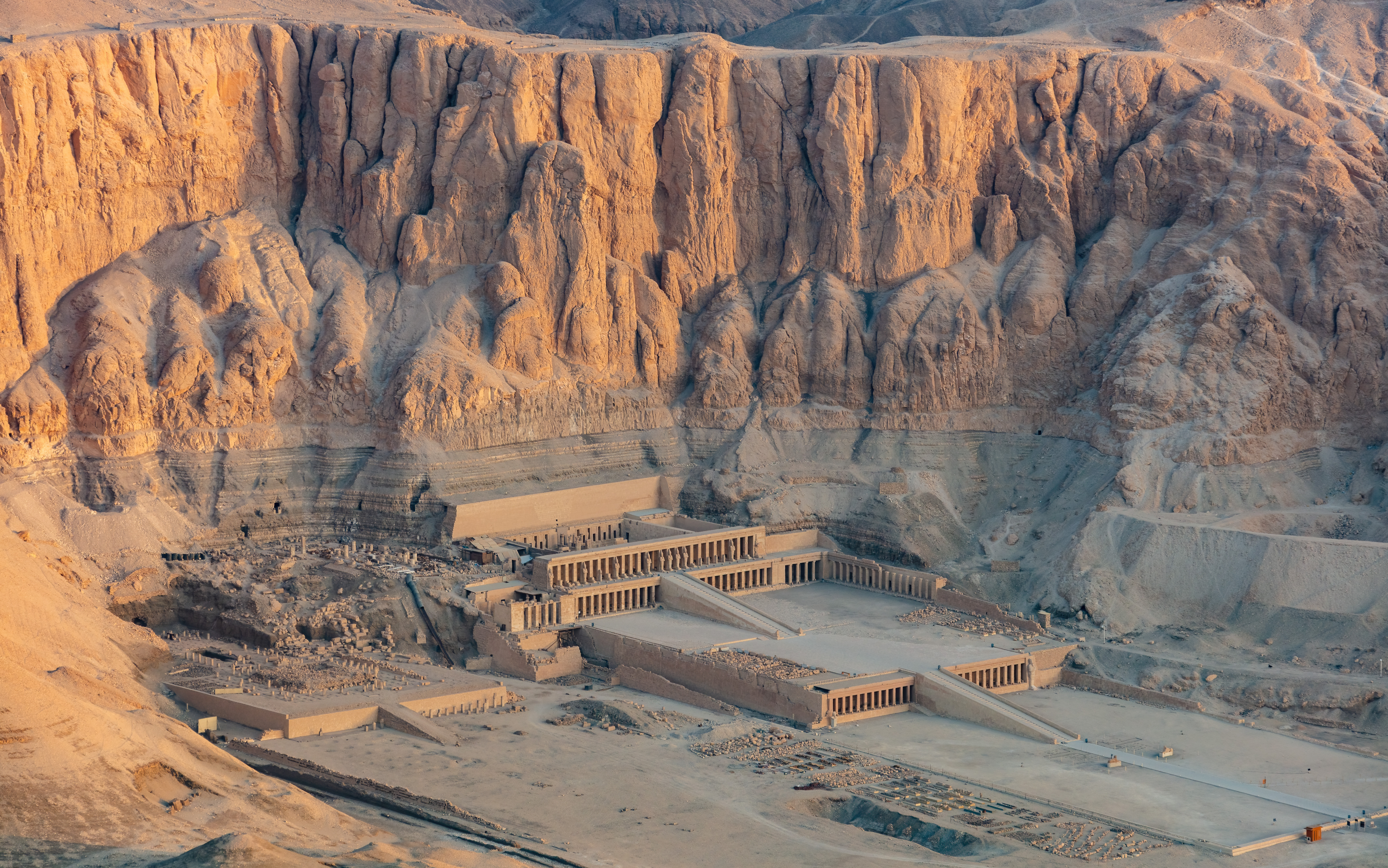
- Hatshepsut's mortuary temple

- Location within Egypt
- 25°44′17.8″N 32°36′23.7″E
- Type: Mortuary temple
- Periods: Late Bronze Age I
- Cultures: Egyptian, Coptic
- Location: Upper Egypt
- Region: Deir el-Bahari

History
- Built: c. 15th century BC
- Built by: Unclear, possibly: Senenmut, Overseer of Works; Hapuseneb, High Priest of Amun

Site notes
- Material: Limestone, sandstone, granite
- Height: 24.5 m (80 ft)
- Length: 273.5 m (897 ft) (Temple) 1,000 m (3,300 ft) (Causeway)
- Width: 105 m (344 ft)
- Excavation dates: 1827–present
- Condition: Reconstructed
- Public access: Limited

The mortuary temple of Hatshepsut (Egyptian: Ḏsr-ḏsrw, lit. 'Holy of Holies') was built during the reign of Pharaoh Hatshepsut of the Eighteenth Dynasty of Egypt. (Note: Proposed dates for Hatshepsut's reign: c. 1502–1482 BC, c. 1498–1483 BC, c. 1479–1458 BC, c. 1473–1458 BC, c. 1472–1457 BC.) Located opposite the city of Luxor, it is considered to be a masterpiece of ancient architecture. (Note: An introduction by the Egyptologists and curators at the Metropolitan Museum of Art in New York Catharine H. Roehrig, Renée Dreyfus, and Cathleen A. Keller: 'During this period Egyptian artists reinterpreted the traditional forms of art and architecture with an originality that is exemplified in Hatshepsut's temple at Deir el-Bahri in western Thebes, one of the great architectural wonders of the ancient world'. A statement by the archaeologist Dieter Arnold: 'A masterpiece of pharaonic temple architecture and indeed of architecture world wide, the building was certainly designed by one of the greatest temple builders of ancient Egypt'. A commentary by Zbigniew Szafrański, former director of the Polish Archaeological and Conservation Expedition at the Temple of Hatshepsut at Deir el-Bahari: 'An explosion of artistic creativity by Hatshepsut is exemplified in her temple at Deir el-Bahari. Landscape, terraced architecture and sculpture created one of the great architectural wonders of the ancient world. It is a masterpiece of pharaonic temple architecture'.) Its three massive terraces rise above the desert floor and into the cliffs of Deir el-Bahari. Hatshepsut's tomb, KV20, lies inside the same massif capped by El Qurn, a pyramid for her mortuary complex. At the edge of the desert, 1 km (0.62 mi) east, connected to the complex by a causeway, lies the accompanying valley temple. Across the river Nile, the whole structure points towards the monumental Eighth Pylon, Hatshepsut's most recognizable addition to the Temple of Karnak and the site from which the procession of the Beautiful Festival of the Valley departed. Its axes identify the temple's twin functions: Its central east-west axis served to receive the barque of Amun-Re at the climax of the festival, while its north-south axis represented the life cycle of the pharaoh from coronation to rebirth.

The terraced temple was constructed between Hatshepsut's seventh and twentieth regnal years, during which building plans were repeatedly modified. In its design, it was heavily influenced by the adjacent Temple of Mentuhotep II of the Eleventh Dynasty built six centuries earlier. (Note: Proposed dates for Mentuhotep II's reign: c. 2066–2014 BC, c. 2051–2000 BC, c. 2055–2004 BC, c. 2010–1998 BC, c. 1897–1887 BC.) In the arrangement of its chambers and sanctuaries, though, the temple is wholly unique. The central axis, customarily reserved for the mortuary complex, is occupied instead by the sanctuary of the barque of Amun-Re, with the mortuary cult being displaced south to form the auxiliary axis with the solar cult complex to the north. Separated from the main sanctuary are shrines to Hathor and Anubis, which lie on the middle terrace. The porticoes that front the terrace here host the most notable reliefs of the temple – those of the expedition to the Land of Punt and the divine birth of Hatshepsut which form the backbone of her case to rightfully occupy the throne as a member of the royal family and as godly progeny. Below, the lowest terrace leads to the causeway and the valley temple.

The state of the temple has suffered over time. Two decades after Hatshepsut's death, under the direction of Thutmose III, references to her rule were erased, usurped, or obliterated. The campaign was intense but brief, quelled after two years when Amenhotep II was enthroned. The reasons behind the proscription remain a mystery. A personal grudge appears unlikely as Thutmose III had waited twenty years to act. Perhaps the concept of a female king was anathema to ancient Egyptian society, or a dynastic dispute between the Ahmosid and Thutmosid lineages needed resolving. In the Amarna Period, the temple was defaced again when Akhenaten ordered the images of Egyptian gods, particularly those of Amun, to be erased. These damages were repaired subsequently under Tutankhamun, Horemheb and Ramesses II. An earthquake in the Third Intermediate Period caused further harm. During the Ptolemaic period, the sanctuary of Amun was restructured, and a new portico was built at its entrance. A Coptic monastery of Saint Phoibammon was built between the 6th and 8th centuries AD, and images of Christ were painted over original reliefs. The latest graffito left is dated to c. 1223.

The temple resurfaces in the records of the modern era in 1737 with Richard Pococke, a British traveller, who visited the site. Several visitations followed though serious excavation was not conducted until the 1850s and 60s under Auguste Mariette. The temple was fully excavated between 1893 and 1906 during an expedition of the Egypt Exploration Fund (EEF) directed by Édouard Naville. Further efforts were carried out by Herbert E. Winlock and the Metropolitan Museum of Art (MMA) from 1911 to 1936, and by Émile Baraize and the Egyptian Antiquities Service (now the Supreme Council of Antiquities (SCA)) from 1925 to 1952. Since 1961, the Polish Centre of Mediterranean Archaeology (PCMA) has carried out extensive consolidation and restoration works throughout the temple, and it was opened to the public in March 2023.

== Design ==
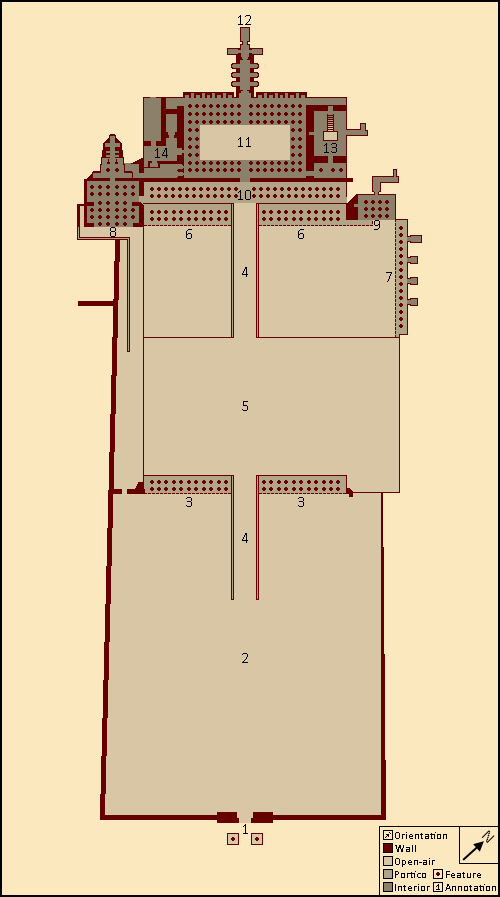
Plan of Hatshepsut's mortuary temple. See footnote for annotations. (Note: 1) entrance gate; 2) lower terrace; 3) lower porticoes; 4) ramps; 5) middle terrace; 6) middle porticoes; 7) north portico; 8) Hathor shrine; 9) Anubis shrine; 10) upper terrace; 11) festival courtyard; 12) Amun shrine; 13) solar cult court; and 14) mortuary cult complex.)

Hatshepsut renewed the act of monument building following her accession to the throne. She focussed her activities on the city of Thebes and the god Amun, by whom she legitimized her reign. To the Temple of Karnak, the preeminent residence of Amun, she contributed the Eighth Pylon – a pair of 30.5 m (100 ft) tall obelisks –, offering chapels, a shrine with another obelisk pair, and statues of herself. Facing Karnak from across the river Nile, she built a mortuary temple against the cliffs of Deir el-Bahari. The pinnacle of her architectural contributions, it is considered to be among the great architectural wonders of the ancient world.

At its far eastern end, lay a valley temple followed by a 1 km (0.62 mi) long, 37 m (121 ft) wide causeway, which also hosted a barque station at its midpoint, that led to the entrance gate of the mortuary temple. Here, three massive terraces rose above the desert floor and led into the Djeser-Djeseru or "Holy of Holies". Nearly the entire temple was built of limestone, with some red granite and sandstone. A single architrave was built of violet sandstone, purportedly sourced from Mentuhotep II's temple. This temple, built centuries earlier and found immediately south of Hatshepsut's, served as an inspiration for her design. On its main axis and at the end of temple, lay the temple's main cult site, a shrine to Amun-Re, which received his barque each year during the Beautiful Festival of the Valley in May. In the south were the offering halls of Thutmose I and Hatshepsut and to the north was the solar cult court. Outside, two further shrines were built for Hathor and Anubis, respectively. In total, the temple comprised five cult sites.

The identity of the architect behind the project remains unclear. It is possible that Senenmut, the Overseer of Works, or Hapuseneb, the High Priest, were responsible. It is also likely that Hatshepsut provided input to the project. Throughout its construction, the temple plan underwent several revisions between the seventh and twentieth years of Hatshepsut's reign. A clear example of these modifications is in the Hathor shrine, whose expansions included, among other things, a conversion from a single to dual hypostyle halls. Its design was directly inspired by Mentuhotep II's adjoining temple immediately south, although its manner of arrangement is unique. For example, while the central shrine of Mentuhotep II's temple was dedicated to his mortuary cult, Hatshepsut instead elevated the shrine of Amun to greater prominence. However, her mortuary cult was otherwise afforded the most voluminous chamber in the temple, harkening back to the offering halls of the pyramid age. There are parallels between the temple's architectural style and contemporaneous Minoan architecture, which has raised the possibility of an international style spreading across the Mediterranean in this period. Hatshepsut may also be of partly Cretan descent. Overall, the temple is representative of New Kingdom funerary architecture, which served to laud the pharaoh and to honour gods relevant to the afterlife.

== Architecture ==
=== Terraces ===
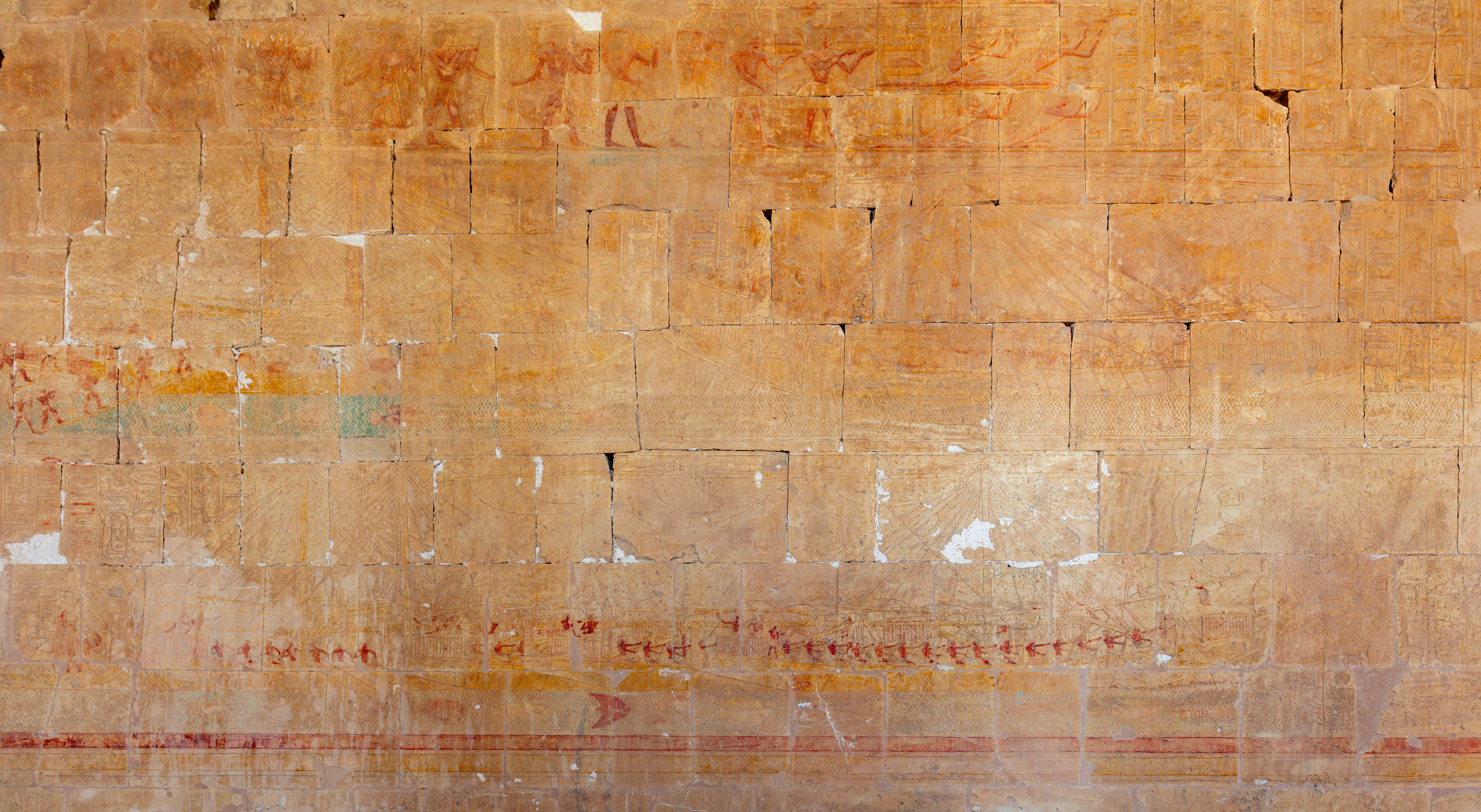
Hatshepsut's expedition to Punt

The opening feature of the temple is the three terraces fronted by a portico leading up to the temple proper and arrived at by a 1 km (0.62 mi) long causeway that led from the valley temple. Each elevated terrace was accessed by a ramp which bifurcated the porticoes.

The lower terrace measures 120 m (390 ft) deep by 75 m (246 ft) wide and was enclosed by a wall with a single 2 m (6.6 ft) wide entrance gate at the centre of its east side. This terrace featured two Persea (Mimusops schimperi) trees, two T-shaped basins that held papyri and flowers, and two recumbent lion statues on the ramp balustrade. The 25 m (82 ft) wide porticoes of the lower terrace contain 22 columns each, arranged in two rows, and feature relief scenes on their walls. The south portico's reliefs depict the transportation of two obelisks from Elephantine to the Temple of Karnak in Thebes, where Hatshepsut is presenting the obelisks and the temple to the god Amun-Re. They also depict Dedwen, Lord of Nubia and the 'Foundation Ritual'. The north portico's reliefs depict Hatshepsut as a sphinx crushing her enemies, along with images of fishing and hunting, and offerings to the gods. The outer ends of the porticoes hosted 7.8 m (26 ft) tall Osiride statues.

The middle terrace measures 75 m (246 ft) deep by 90 m (300 ft) wide fronted by porticoes on the west and partially on the north sides. The west porticoes contain 22 columns arranged in two rows while the north portico contains 15 columns in a single row. The reliefs of the west porticoes of this terrace are the most notable from the mortuary temple. The southwest portico depicts the expedition to the Land of Punt and the transportation of exotic goods to Thebes. The northwest portico reliefs narrate the divine birth of Hatshepsut to Thutmose I, represented as Amun-Re, and Ahmose. Thus legitimizing her rule through royal lineage and godly progeny. This is the oldest known scene of its type. Construction of the north portico and its four or five chapels was abandoned before completion, and consequently, it was left blank. The terrace also likely featured sphinxes set up along the path to the next ramp, whose balustrade was adorned by falcons resting upon coiled cobras. In the southwest and northwest corner of the terrace are the shrines to Hathor and Anubis, respectively.

The upper terrace opens to 26 columns each fronted by a 5.2 m (17 ft) tall Osiride statue of Hatshepsut. They are split in the centre by a granite gate through which the festival courtyard was entered. This division is represented geographically, too, as the southern colossi carry the Hedjet of Upper Egypt, while the northern colossi bear the Pschent of Lower Egypt. The portico here completes the narrative of the preceding porticoes with the coronation of Hatshepsut as king of Upper and Lower Egypt. The courtyard is surrounded by pillars, two rows deep on the north, east and south sides, and three rows deep on the west side. Eight smaller and ten larger niches were cut into the west wall, these are presumed to have contained kneeling and standing statues of Pharaoh Hatshepsut. The remaining walls are carved with reliefs: the Beautiful Festival of the Valley on the north, the Festival of Opet on the east, and the coronation rituals on the south. Three cult sites branch off from the courtyard. The sanctuary of Amun lies west on the main axis, to the north was the solar cult court, and to the south is a chapel dedicated to the mortuary cults of Hatshepsut and Thutmose I.

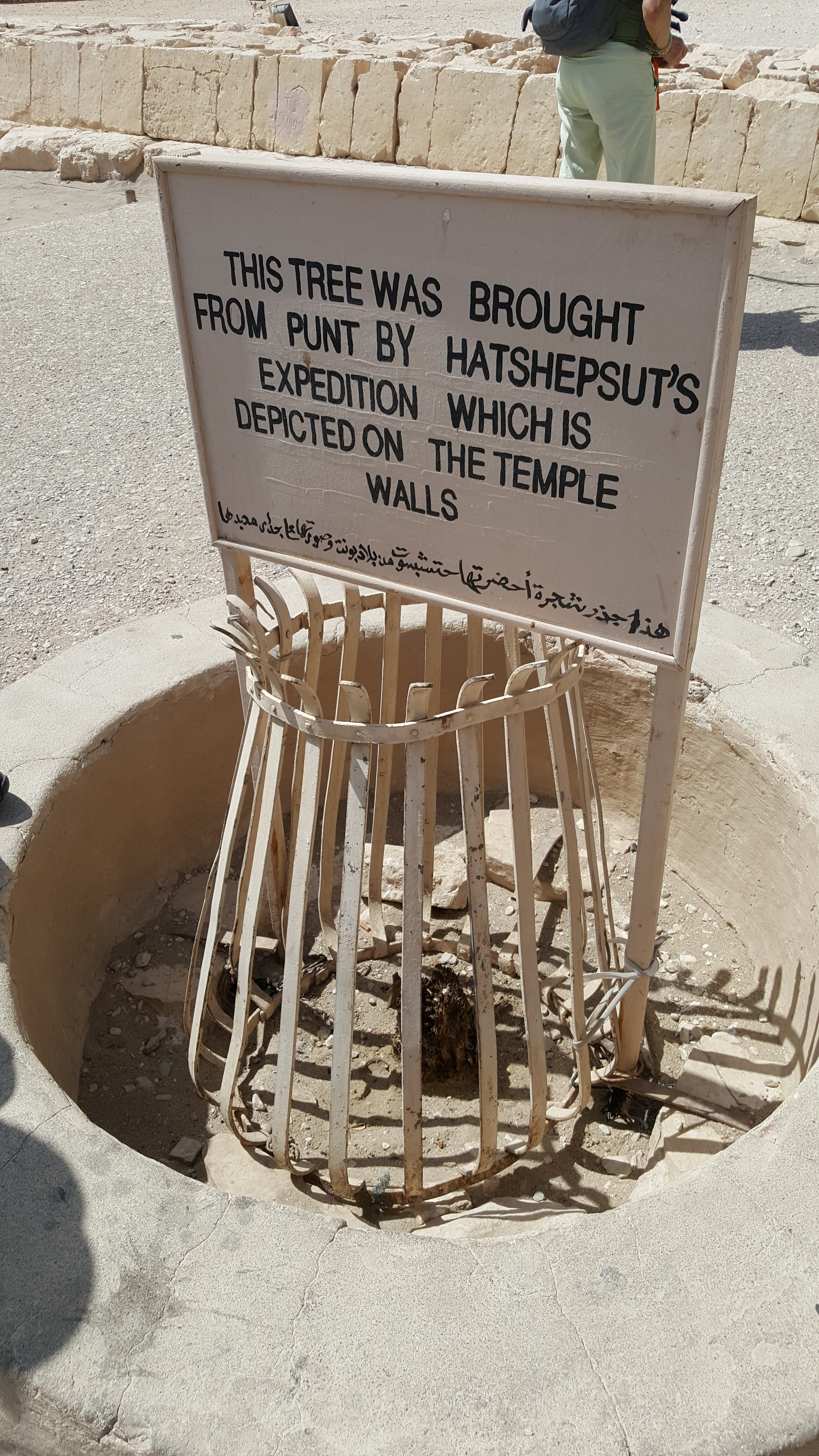
Remains of a Persea tree of the lower terrace

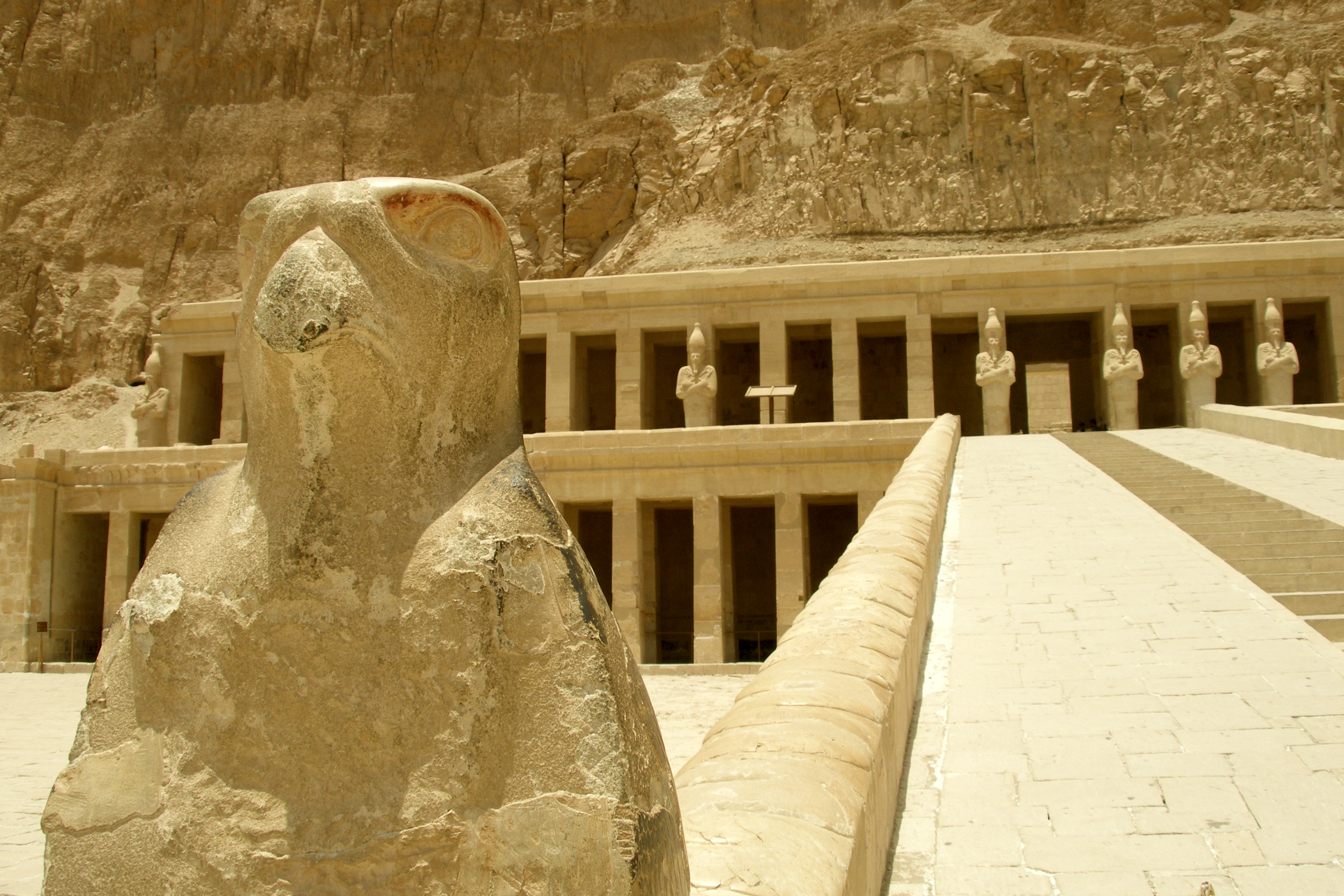
Balustrade adorned with a Horus statue

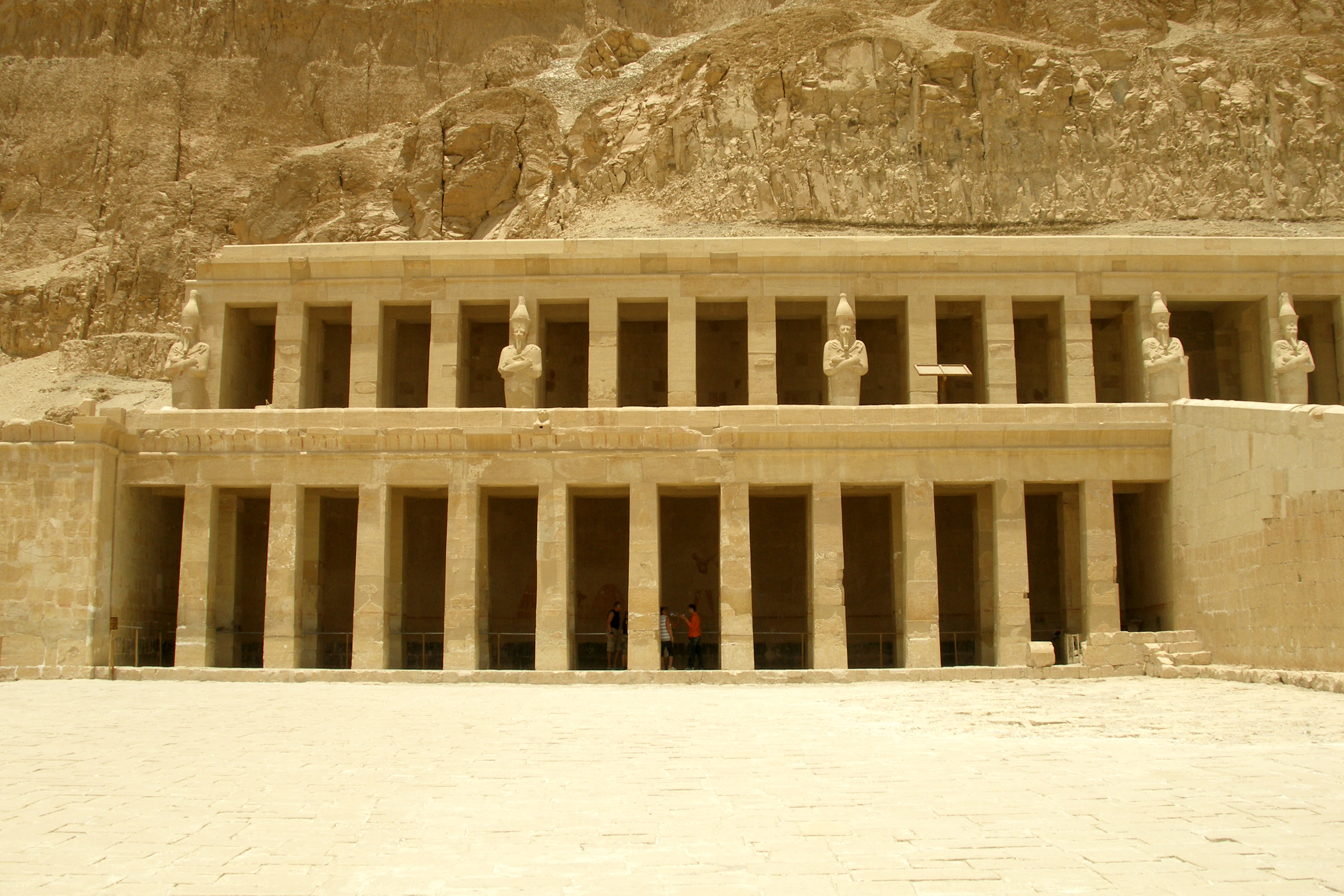
Punt portico of the middle terrace

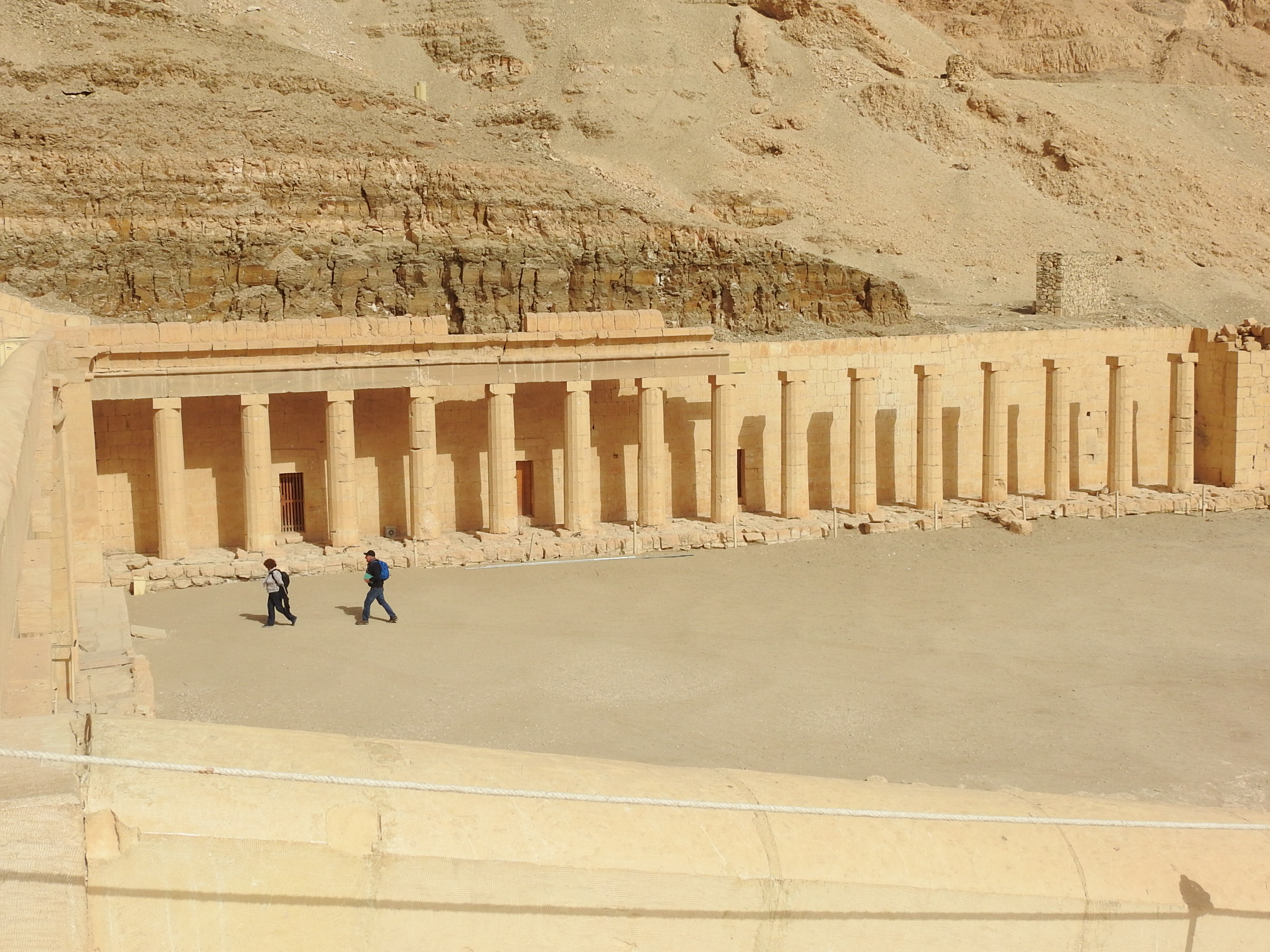
North portico of the middle terrace

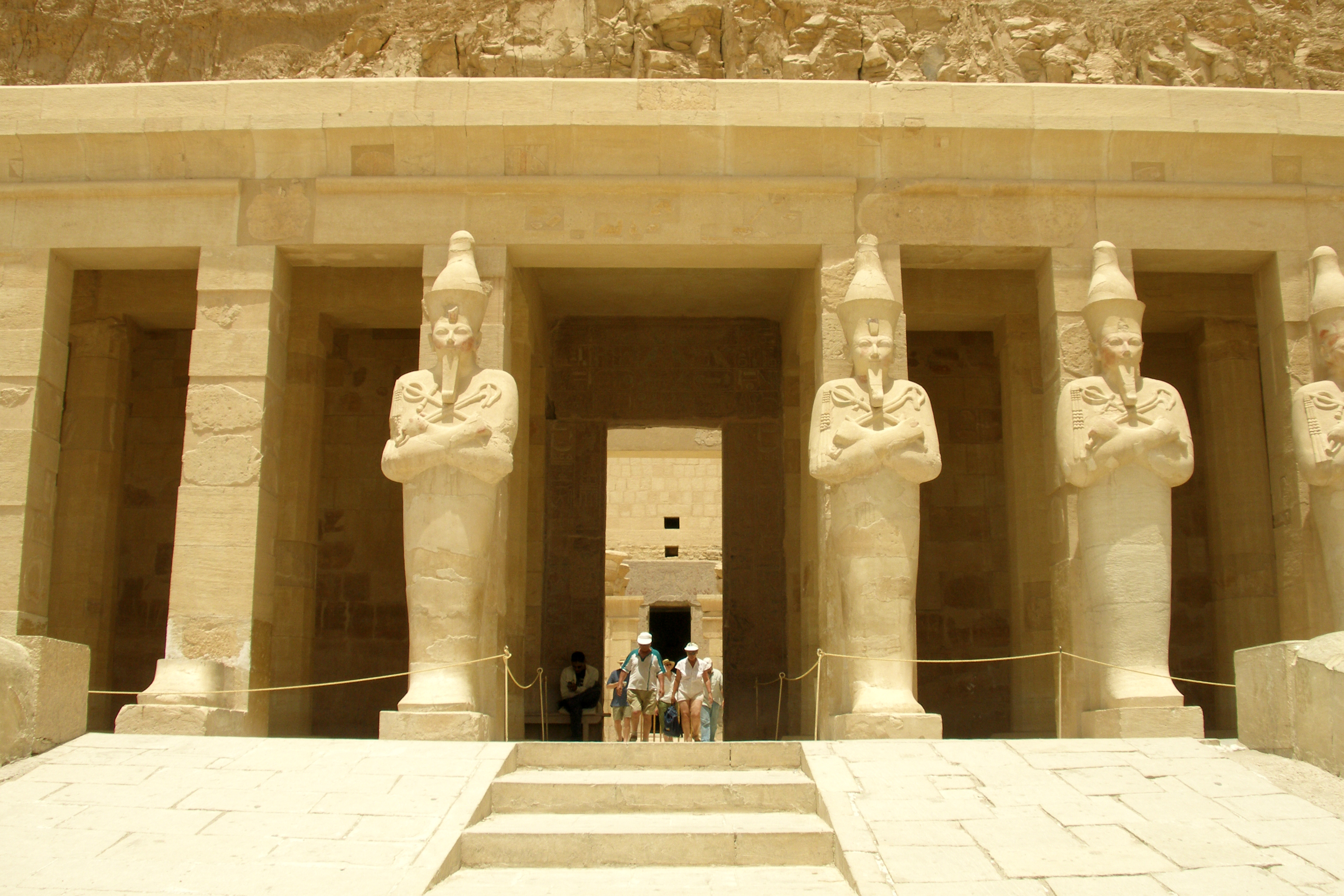
Osiride statues of Hatshepsut of the upper terrace

=== Hathor shrine ===
At the south end of the middle terrace is a shrine dedicated to the goddess Hathor. The shrine is separated from the temple and is accessed by a ramp from the lower terrace, although an alternative entrance existed at the upper terrace. The ramp opens to a portico adorned with four columns carrying Hathor capitals. The walls of the entrance contain scenes of Hathor being fed by Hatshepsut. Inside are two hypostyle halls, the first containing 12 columns and the second containing 16. Beyond this is a vestibule containing two columns and a double sanctuary. Reliefs on the walls of the shrine depict Hathor with Hatshepsut, the goddess Weret-hekhau presenting the pharaoh with a Menat necklace, and Senenmut. Hathor holds special significance in Thebes, representing the hills of Deir el-Bahari, and also to Hatshepsut, who presented herself as a reincarnation of the goddess. Hathor is also associated with Punt, which is the subject of reliefs in the proximate portico.

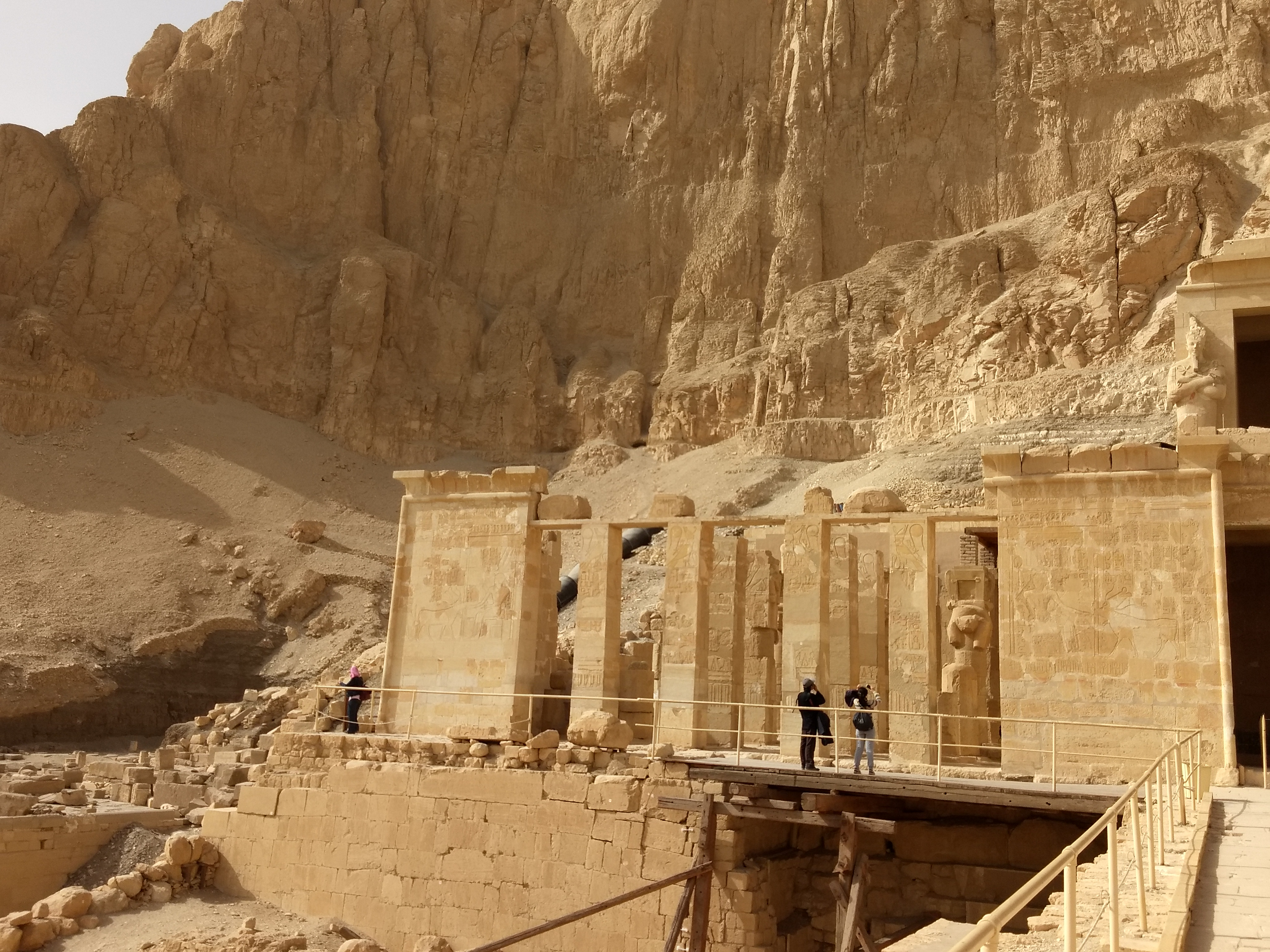
The shrine to Hathor

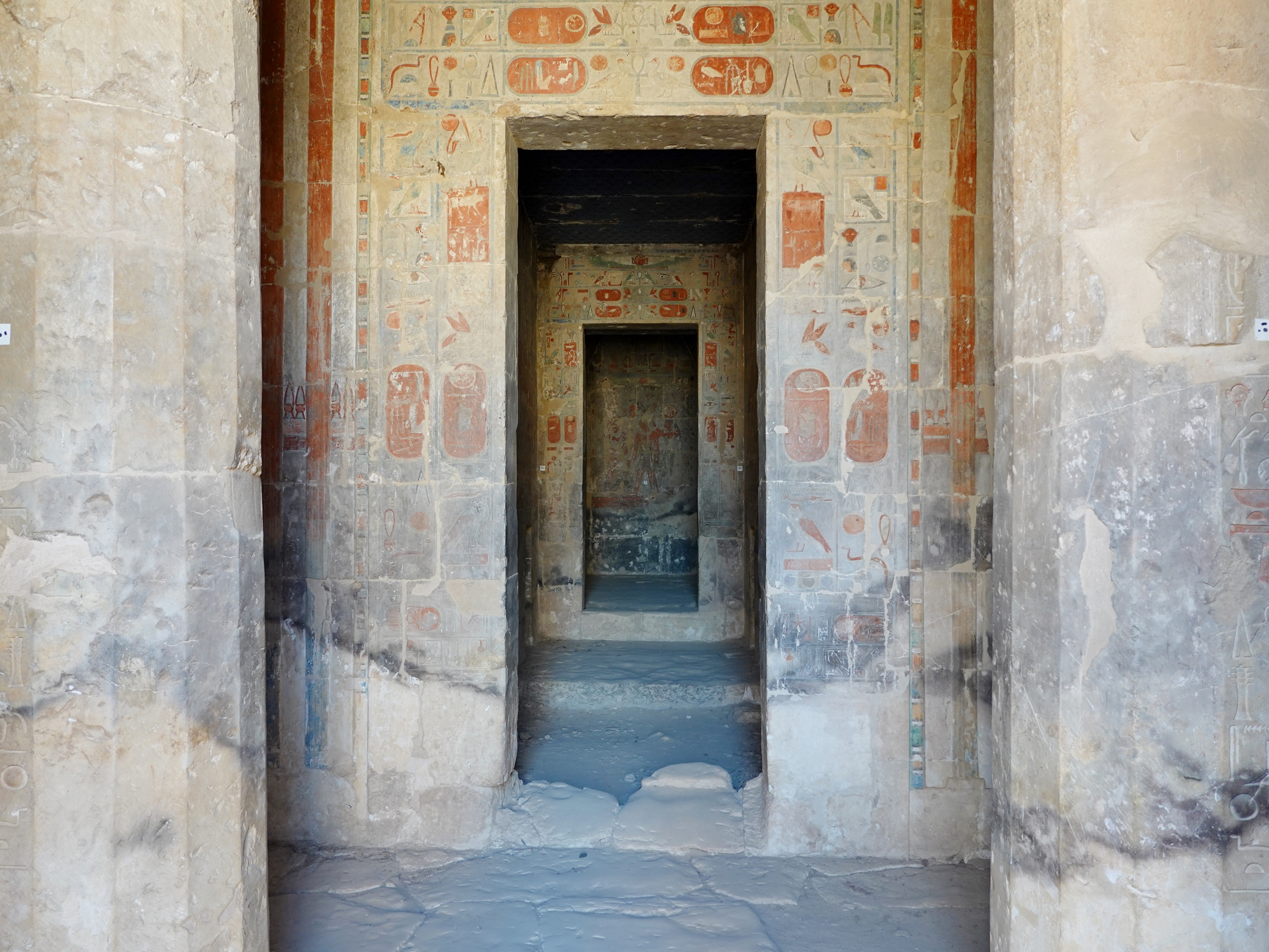
Entrance into the Hathor shrine

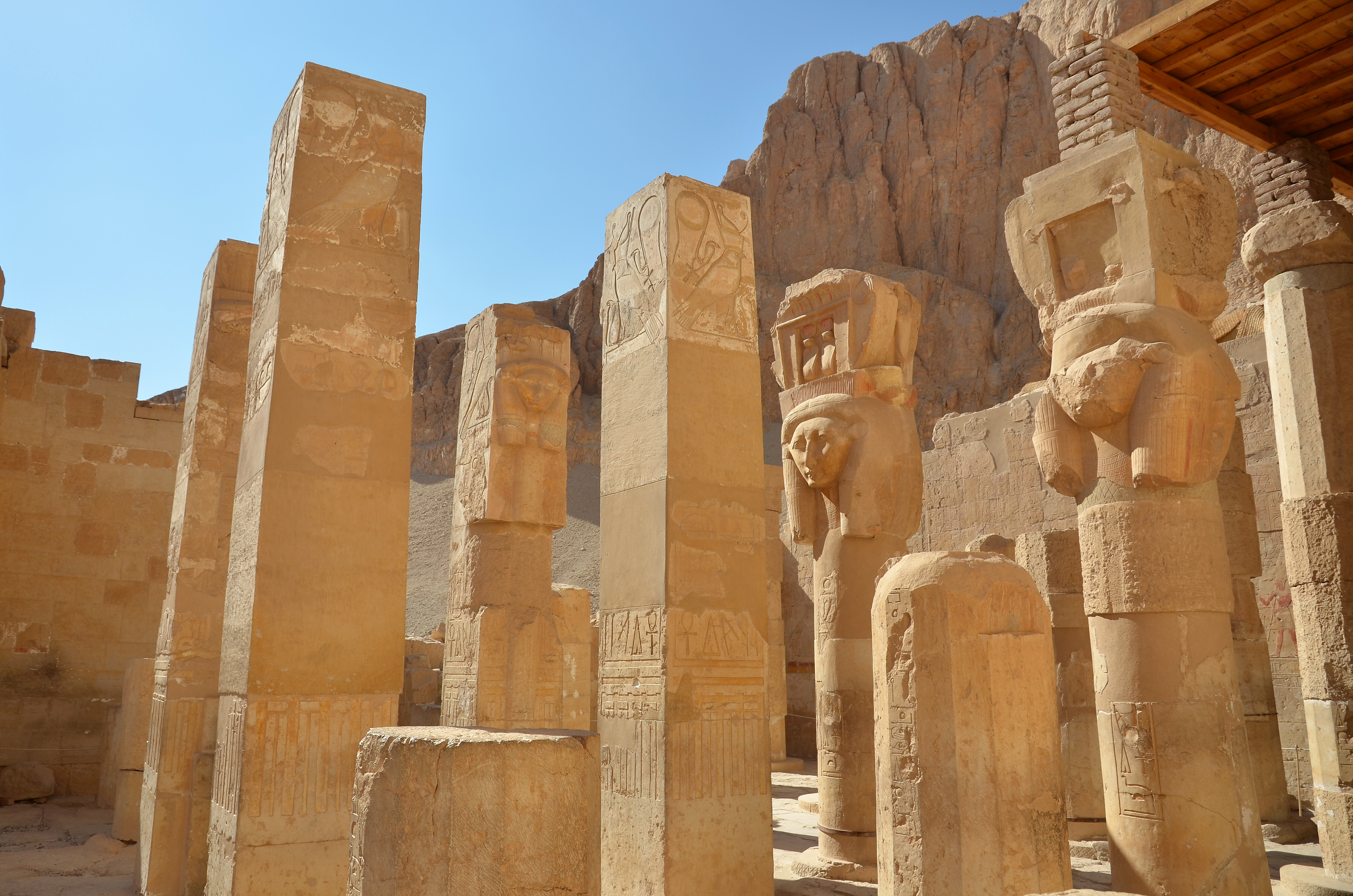
Hathor capital columns

=== Anubis shrine ===
At the north end of the middle terrace is a shrine dedicated to the god Anubis. This shrine is smaller than its counterpart to Hathor in the south. It comprises a hypostyle hall adorned with 12 columns arranged into three rows of four, followed by a sequence of two rooms terminating at a small niche. Images presented on the walls are of offerings and cult activity, with a relief showing Anubis escorting Hatshepsut to the shrine. The name of Anubis was used to designate the heir to the throne, which the Egyptologist Ann Macy Roth associates with the reliefs depicting Hatshepsut's divine birth.

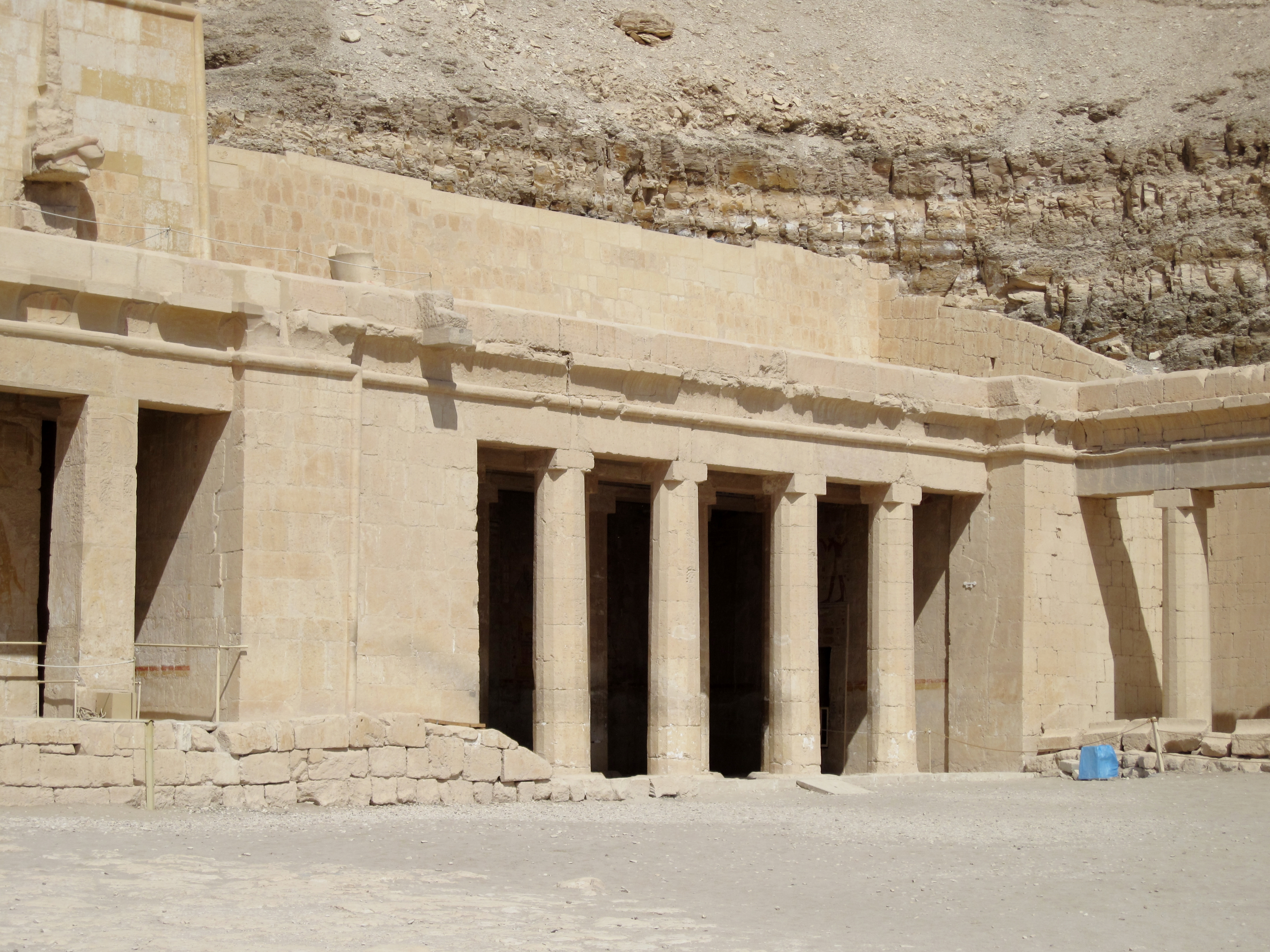
The shrine to Anubis

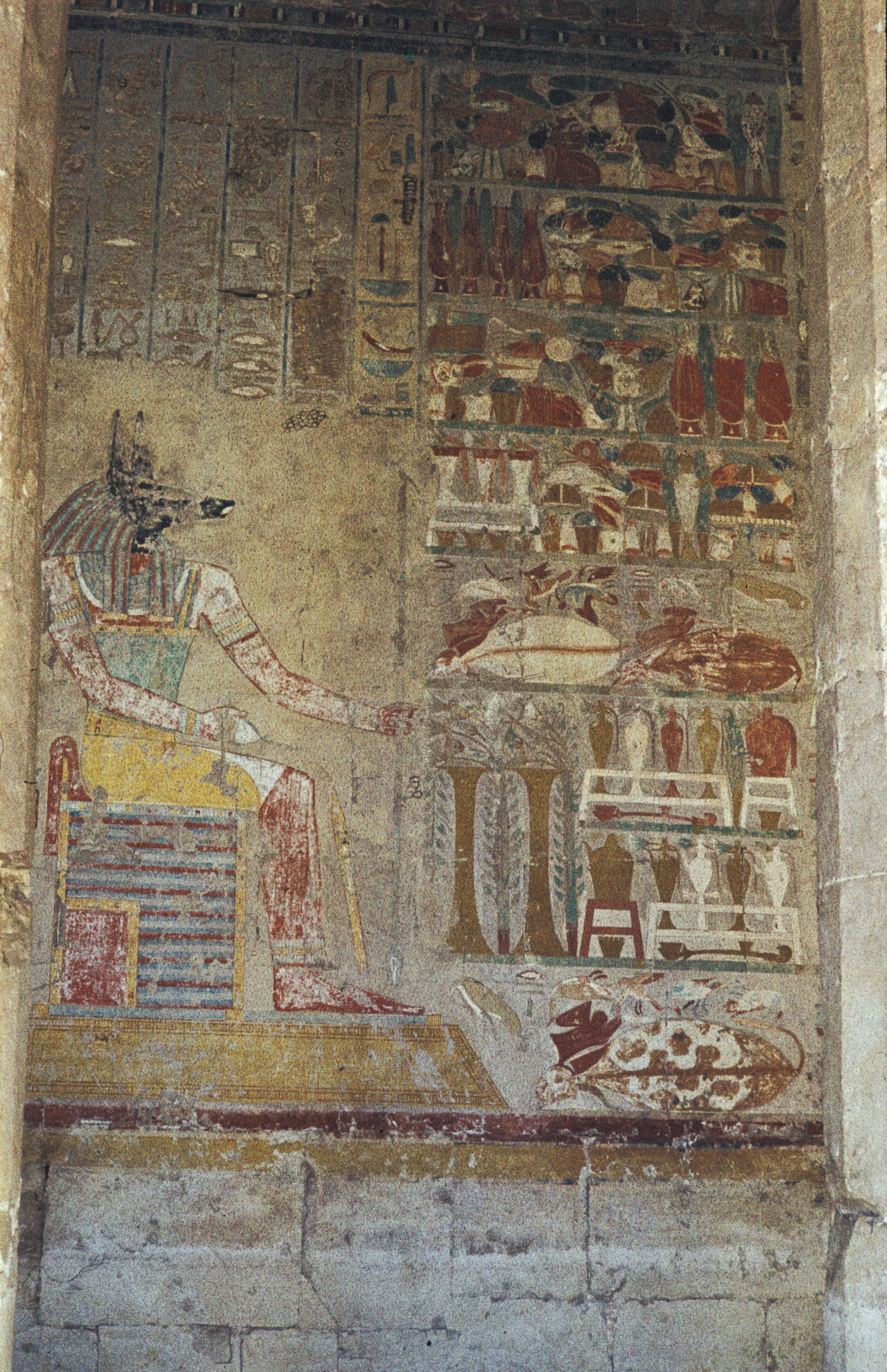
Anubis presented with bounteous offerings

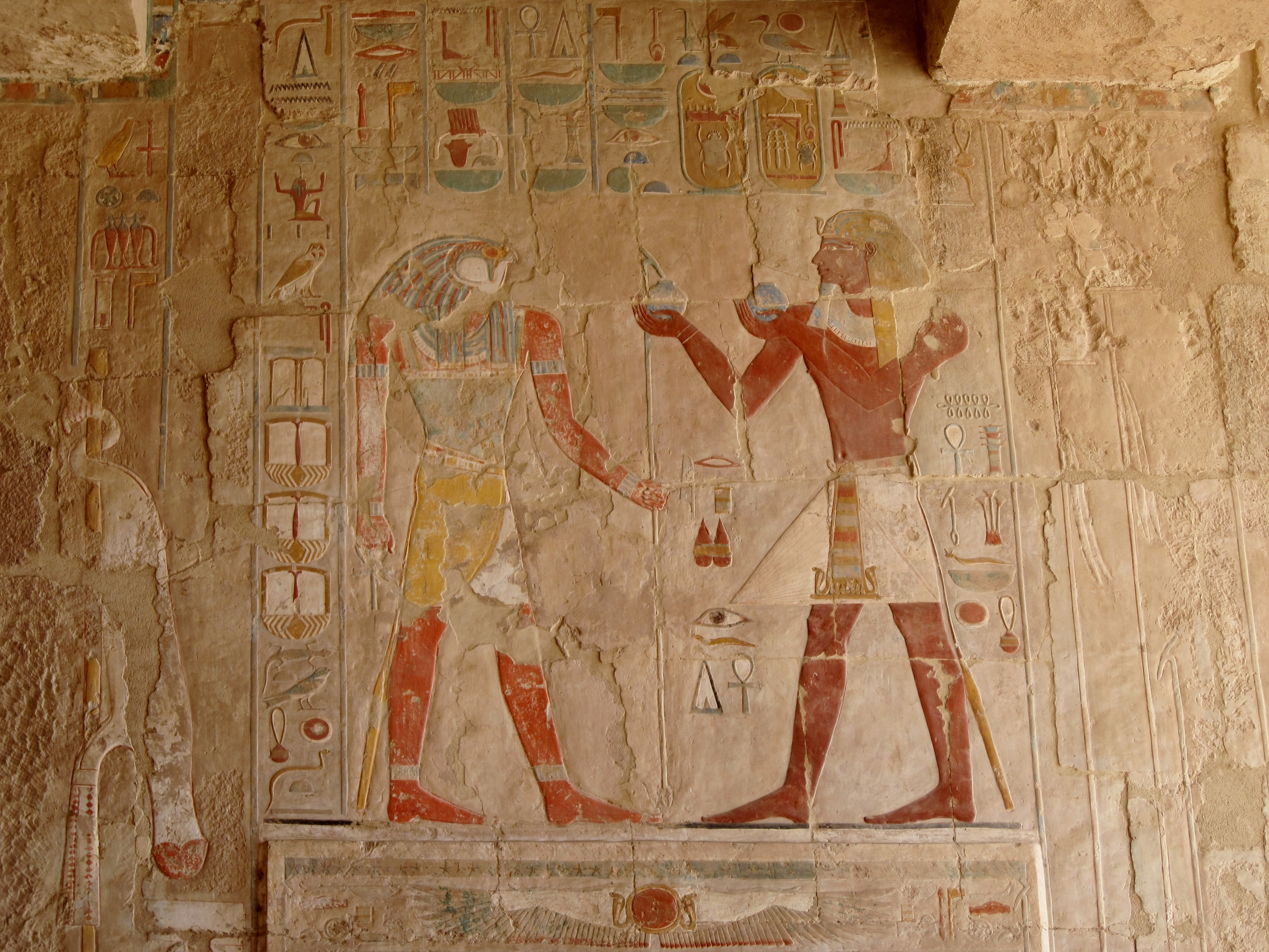
Sokaris (Sokar-Osiris) presented with wine by Thutmose III

=== Amun shrine ===
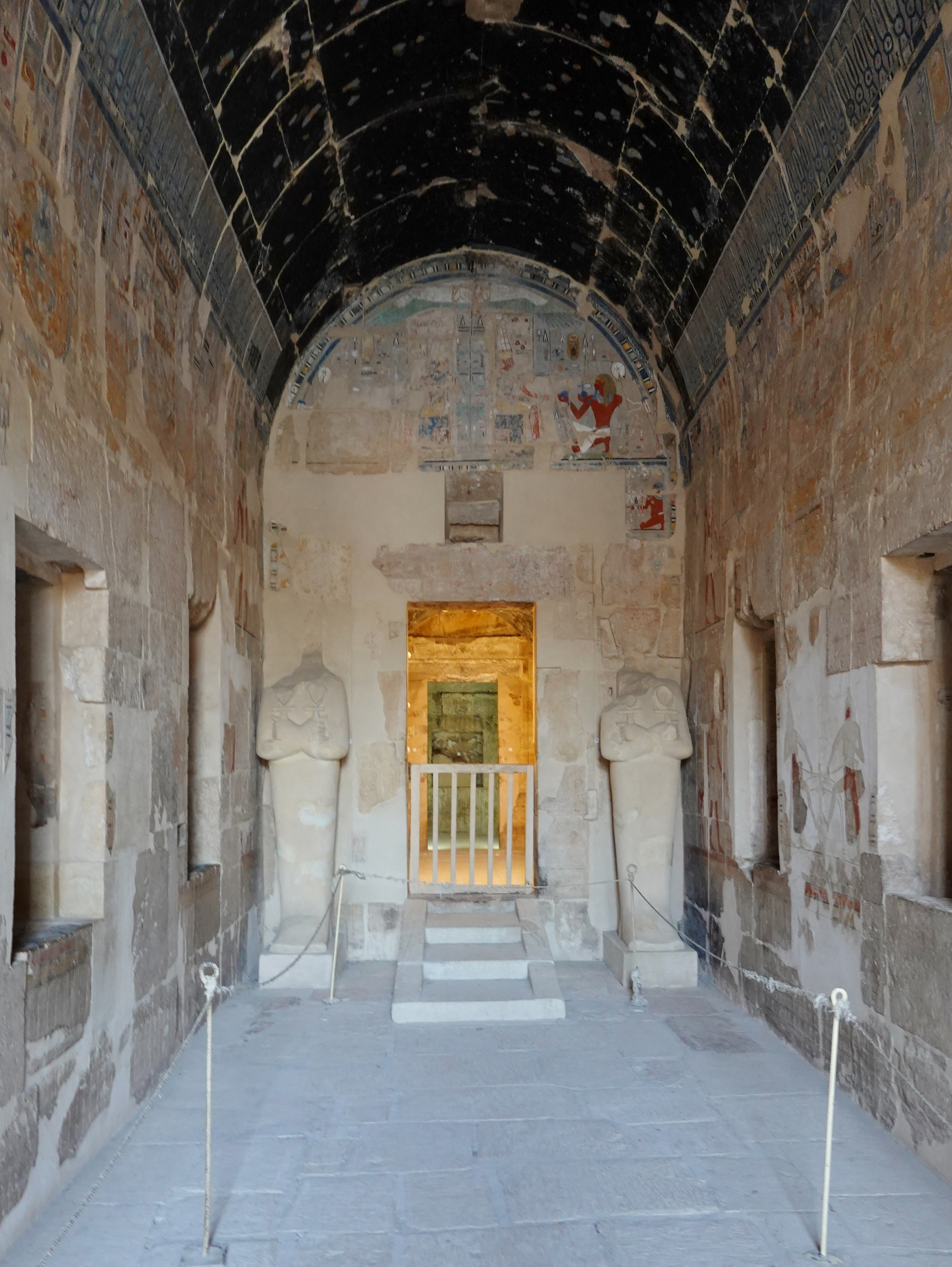
Barque hall of the shrine to Amun

Situated at the back of the temple, on its central axis, is the climactic point of the temple, the sanctuary of Amun, to whom Hatshepsut had dedicated the temple as 'a garden for my father Amun'. Inside, the first chamber was a chapel which hosted the barque of Amun and a skylight that allowed light to flood onto the statue of Amun. The lintel of the red granite entrance depicts two Amuns seated upon a throne with backs together and kings kneeling in submission before them, a symbol of his supreme status in the sanctuary. Inside the hall are scenes of offerings presented by Hatshepsut and Thutmose I, accompanied by Ahmose and Princesses Neferure and Nefrubity, four Osiride statues of Hatshepsut in the corners, and six statues of Amun occupying the niches of the hall. In the tympanum, cartouches containing Hatshepsut's name are flanked and apotropaically guarded by those of Amun-Re. This chamber was the endpoint of the annual Beautiful Festival of the Valley.

The second chamber contained a cult image of Amun, and was flanked either side by a chapel. The north chapel was carved with reliefs depicting the gods of the Heliopolitan Ennead and the south chapel with the corresponding Theban Ennead. The enthroned gods each carried a was-sceptre and an ankh. Presiding over the delegations, Atum and Montu occupied the end walls. The third chamber contained a statue around which the 'Daily Ritual' was also performed. It was originally believed to have been constructed a millennium after the original temple, under Ptolemy VIII Euergetes, named 'the Ptolemaic Sanctuary'. The discovery of reliefs depicting Hatshepsut evidence the construction during her reign instead. The Egyptologist Dieter Arnold speculates that it might have hosted a granite false door.

=== Solar cult court ===
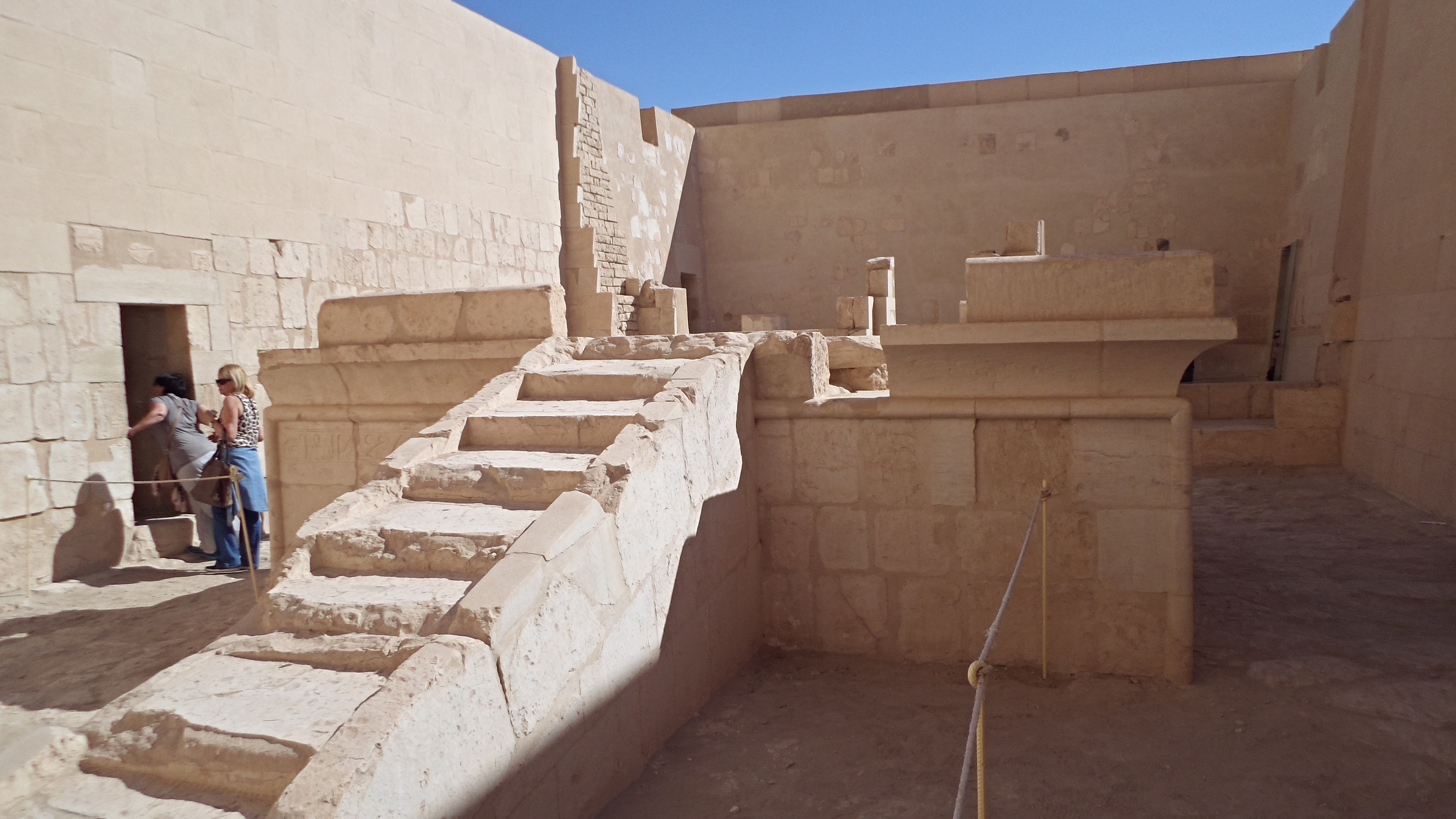
Altar of the solar cult complex

The solar cult is accessed from the courtyard through a vestibule occupied by three columns on the north side of the upper terrace courtyard. The doorjamb of the entrance is embellished with the figures of Hatshepsut, Ra-Horakhty (Horus) and Amun. The reliefs in the vestibule contain images of Thutmose I and Thutmose III. The vestibule opens to the main court, which hosts a grand altar open to the sky and accessed from a staircase in the court's west. There are two niches present in the court in the south and west wall. The former shows Ra-Horakhty presenting an ankh to Hatshepsut, and the latter contains a relief of Hatshepsut as a priest of her cult. Attached to the court was a chapel (Note: It is variously referred to as the 'upper Anubis shrine', 'chapel of the parents' and 'chapel of Thutmose I'.) which contained representations of Hatshepsut's family. In these, Thutmose I and his mother, Seniseneb, are depicted giving offerings to Anubis, while Hatshepsut and Ahmose are depicted giving offerings to Amun-Re.

=== Mortuary cult complex ===
Situated in the south of the courtyard was the mortuary cult complex. Accessed through a vestibule adorned with three columns are two offering halls oriented on an east–west axis. The northern hall is dedicated to Thutmose I; the southern hall is dedicated to Hatshepsut. Hatshepsut's offering-hall emulated those found in the mortuary temples of the Old and Middle Kingdom pyramid complexes. It measured 13.25 m (43.5 ft) deep by 5.25 m (17.2 ft) wide and had a vaulted ceiling 6.35 m (20.8 ft) high. Consequently, it was the largest chamber in the entire temple. Thutmose I's offering-hall was decidedly smaller, measuring 5.36 m (17.6 ft) deep by 2.65 m (8.7 ft) wide. Both halls contained red granite false doors, scenes of animal-sacrifice, offerings and offering-bearers, priests performing rituals, and the owner of the chapel seated before a table receiving those offerings. Scenes from the offering-hall are direct copies of those present in the Pyramid of Pepi II, from the end of the Sixth Dynasty.

=== Foundation deposits ===
Before its construction, the 'stretching of the cord', or the 'foundation ritual', was performed. The ritual is depicted in detail on the south portico of the lower terrace. The ceremony opens before the goddess Seshat; it follows Hatshepsut and her ka scattering besen grains before she offers her temple to Amun-Re. The next scene is lost, preceding the closing scene of the 'Great Offering' to Amun-Re-Kamutef. During the ceremony, the consecration of foundation deposits would take place, a practice that started as early as the Third Dynasty of Egypt at the Pyramid of Djoser. Sixteen known foundation deposits at Hatshepsut's temple generally outline its perimeter, and a further three at the valley temple. Broadly, pottery, votives, food and ritual offerings, tools, scarabs, and seal amulets were deposited into the prepared holes. The titles of Hatshepsut, Thutmose III, and Neferure are incised into some of these items, as are images and names of gods.

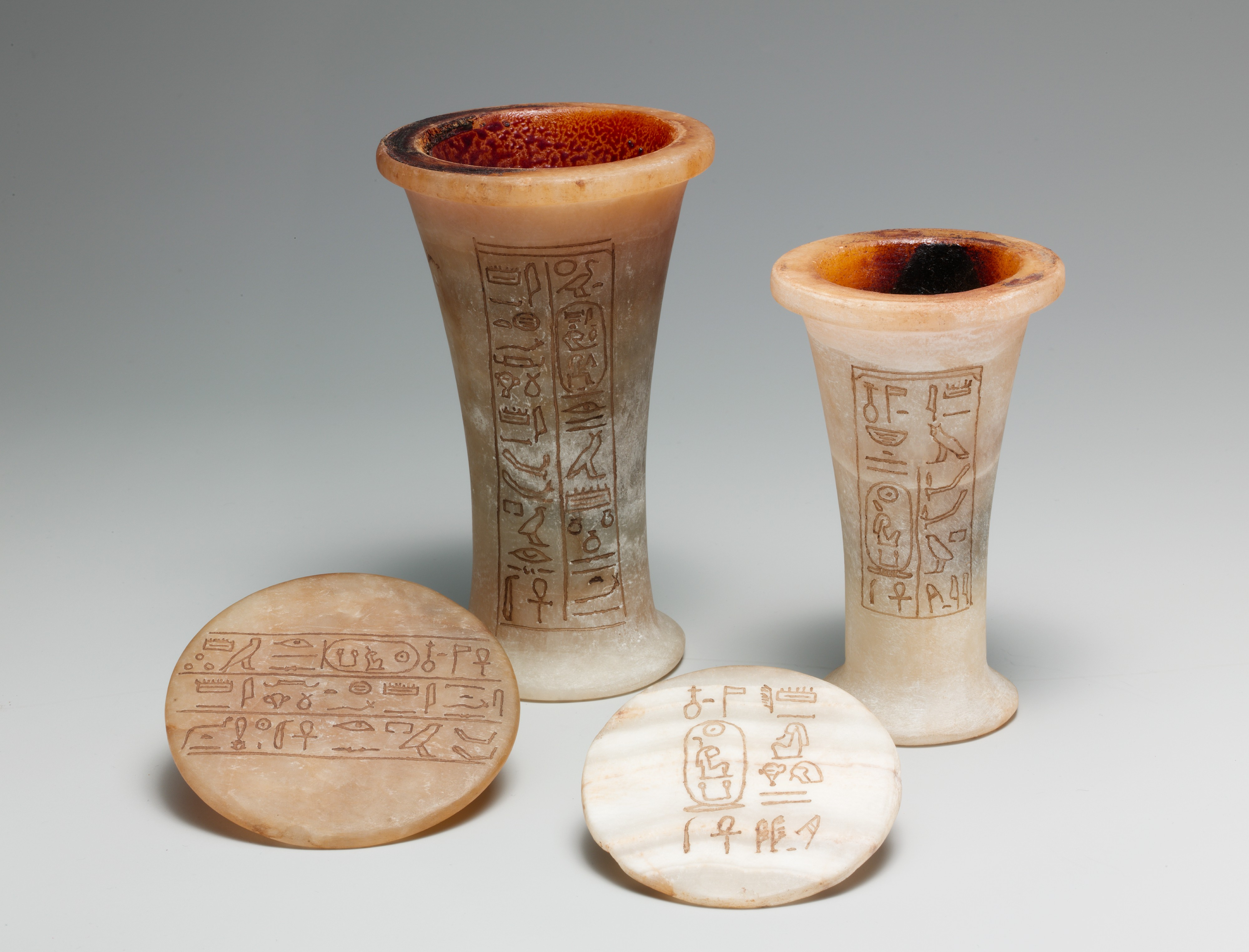
Travertine vases (Note: Tall vase bears sꜥt-rꜥ ẖnmt-ỉmn-ḥꜣt-špśwt ỉr n s mnw s n ỉt s ỉmn ḫft pḏ-šśḥr ḏsr-ḏsrw-ỉmn ỉr s ꜥnḫ-tỉ translating to 'daughter of Re Khnemet-Imen-Hatshepsut made her monument for her father at the time of the stretching of the cord over Djeser-djeseru-Amun so that she may be made to live'. Small vase bears nṯrt nfr nbt tꜣwy mꜣꜥt-kꜣ-rꜥ ꜥnḫ-tỉ * ỉmn m ḏsr-ḏsr-w mrỉt translating to 'the good goddess, lady of the Two Lands, Maatkare, may she be made to live * beloved of Amun in Djeser-djeseru. See also Catharine H. Roehrig's translations on pp. 144–145.) and lids (Note: Large lid bears nṯrt nfr mꜣꜥt-kꜣ-rꜥ ỉr n s mnw s n ỉt s ỉmn ḫft pḏ-šśḥr ḏsr-ḏsrw-ỉmn ỉr s ꜥnḫ-tỉ rꜥ mỉ ḏt translating to 'the good goddess Maatkare, she made her monument for her father Amun at the time of the stretching of the cord over Djeser-djeseru-Amun so that she may be made to live like Re forever'. Small lid bears two columns of text facing each other reading nṯrt nfr mꜣꜥt-kꜣ-rꜥ ꜥnḫ-tỉ * ỉmn ḥr-tp tꜣwy mrỉt translating to 'the good goddess Maatkare, may she be made to live' * 'beloved of Amun, on behalf of the Two Lands'.) retrieved from a foundation deposit

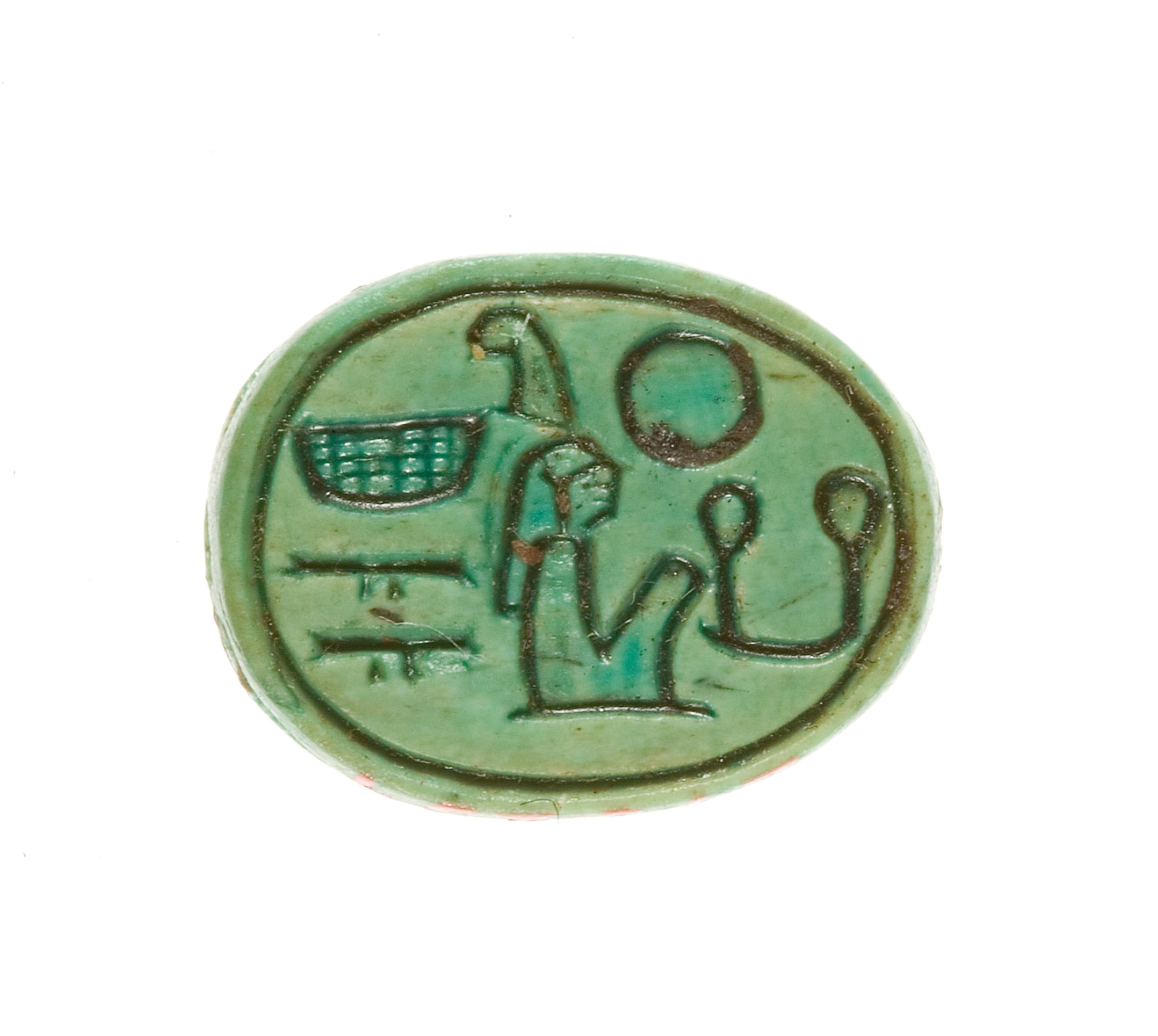
Scarab bearing the inscription mꜣꜥt-kꜣ-rꜥ nb tꜣwy meaning Lord of the Two Lands, Maatkare

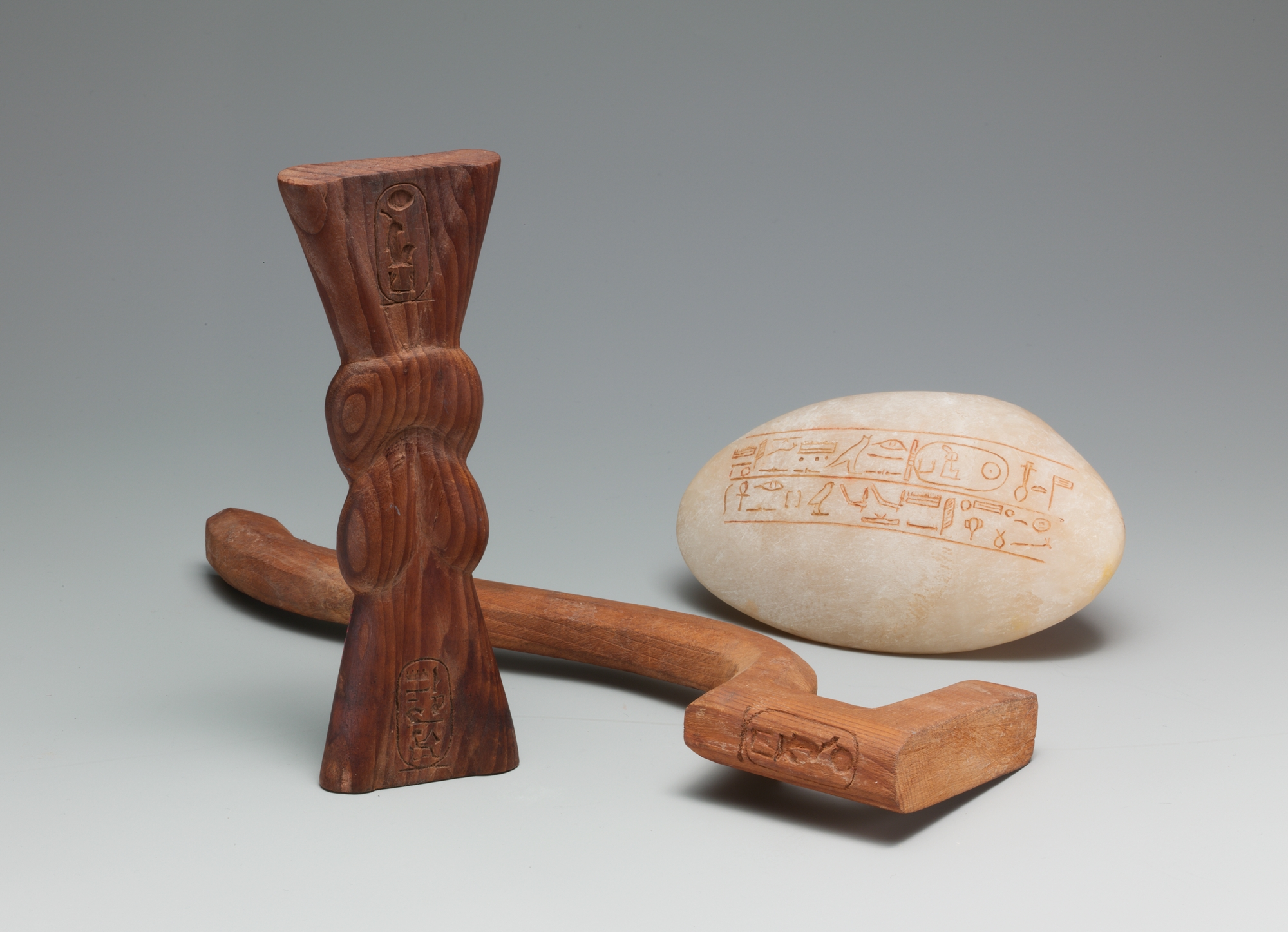
Delicately inscribed hammering stone, (Note: Bearing the inscription nṯrt nfr mꜣꜥt-kꜣ-rꜥ ỉr n s mnw s n ỉt s ỉmn-rꜥ ḫft pḏ-šśḥr ḏsr-ḏsrw-ỉmn ỉr s ꜥnḫ-tỉ translating to 'the good goddess Maatkare, she made her temple for her father Amun-Re at the time of the stretching of the cord over Djeser-djeseru-Amun so that she may be made to live'. See also Catharine H. Roehrig's translation on p. 145.) knot amulet, (Note: Bears her prenomen mꜣꜥt-kꜣ-rꜥ above and nomen ẖnmt-ỉmn-ḥꜣt-špswt below.) and msḫtyw adze (Note: Bears her prenomen mꜣꜥt-kꜣ-rꜥ.)

== Function ==
=== Mortuary complex ===
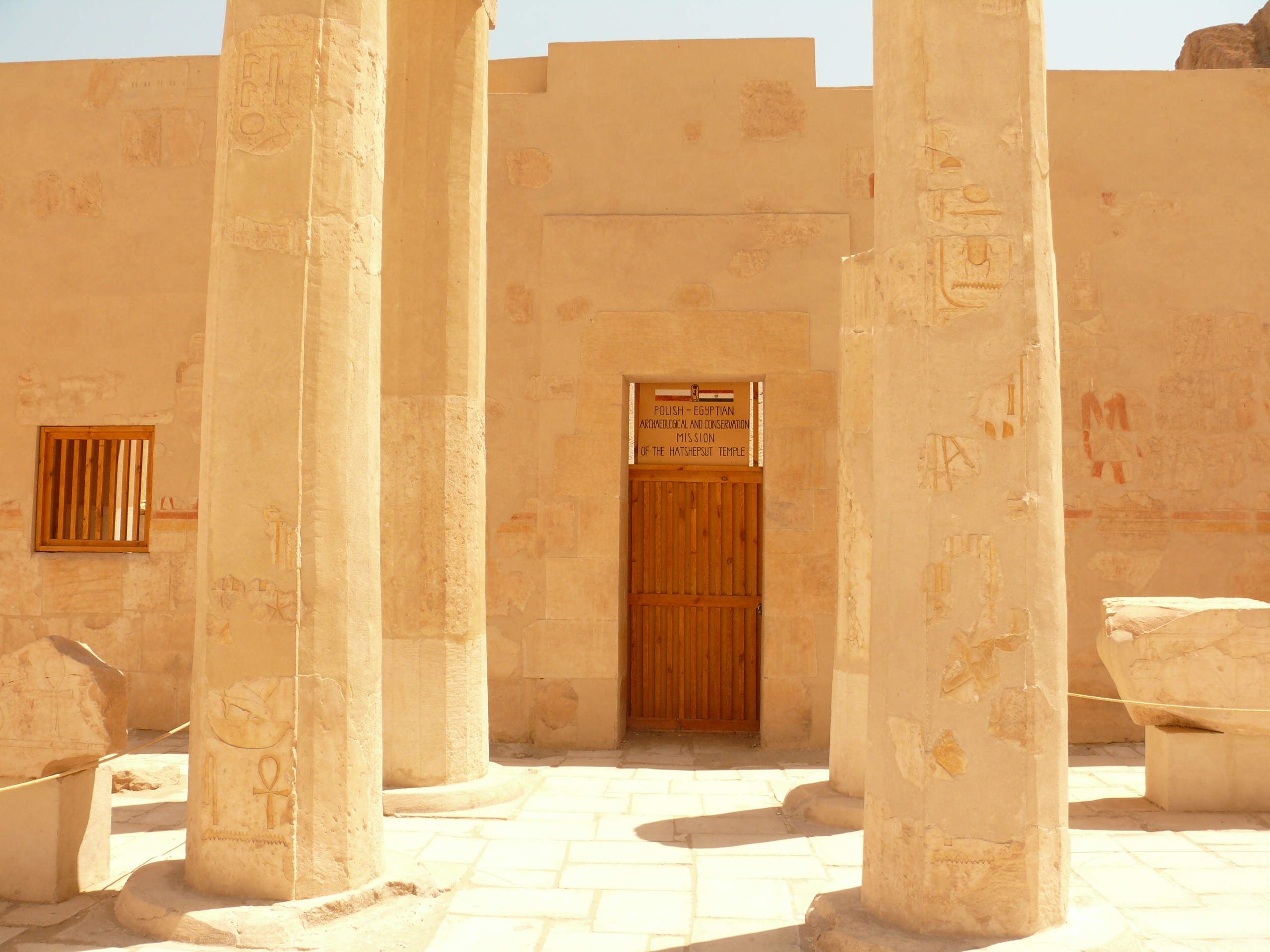
Entrance to the mortuary cult complex flanked by columns and the coronation ritual

It has been suggested that Hatshepsut's tomb in the Valley of the Kings, KV20, was meant to be an element of the mortuary complex at Deir el-Bahari. The arrangement of the temple and tomb bear a spatial resemblance to the pyramid complexes of the Old Kingdom, which comprised five central elements: valley temple, causeway, mortuary temple, main pyramid, and cult pyramid. Hatshepsut's temple complex included the valley temple, causeway, and mortuary temple. Her tomb was built into the massif of the same cliffs as the temple, beneath the dominating peak of El Qurn (489 m (1,604 ft) AMSL) that caps her tomb, in a sense, like the pyramid capped the tomb of an Old Kingdom pharaoh.

Further, her tomb aligns with the offering hall of the mortuary cult complex. There is another analogous relationship between the mortuary temple and Karnak and that of the pyramids and Heliopolis. Though KV20 is recognized as the tomb of Hatshepsut, there is a dispute over who commissioned its initial construction. Two competing hypotheses suggest that the tomb was built initially during the reign of either Thutmose I or Thutmose II and that Hatshepsut had the tomb altered later with an additional chamber for her burial.

The principal function of the temple was to serve the royal mortuary cults of Hatshepsut and Thutmose I. To fulfill this purpose, a mortuary cult complex was built where offerings could be made for the kꜣ, or spirit, of the king. In the Egyptian conception, the deceased relied on the same sustenance as the living. In life, the aspects of the soul, the kꜣ, bꜣ and ꜣḫ, were contained in the vessel of the living body. On death, the body was rendered immobile, and the soul was able to leave it. In her temple, food and drink were offered before the granite false doors of the offering chapels. The mortuary ritual, lists of offerings, and the recipient of the rites were depicted on the east wall of both chapels.

=== Beautiful Festival of the Valley ===
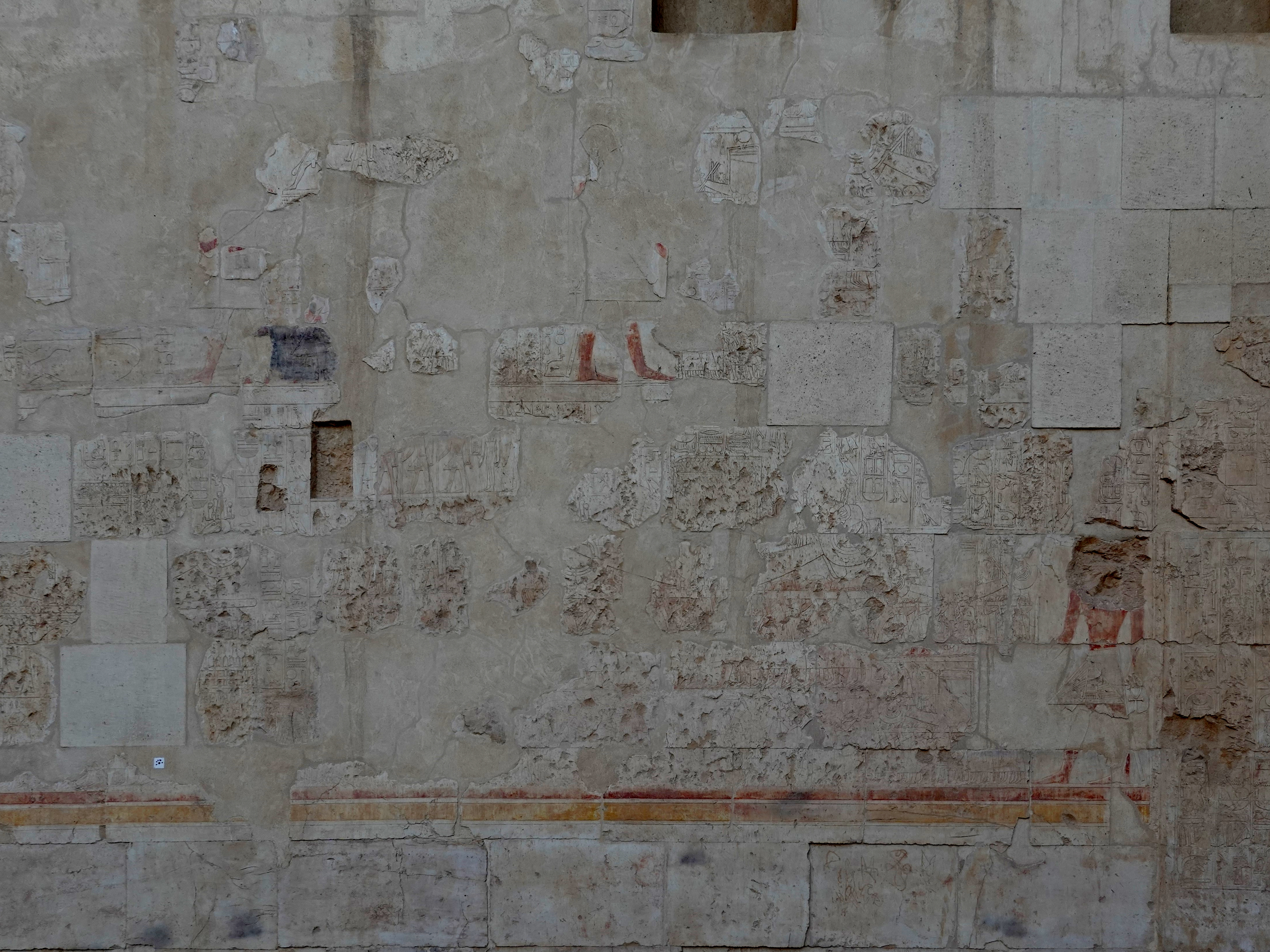
A section of the Beautiful Festival of the Valley relief

The sanctuary of Amun was the endpoint of the Beautiful Festival of the Valley, conducted annually, starting at the Temple of Karnak. This celebration dates to the Middle Kingdom, when it concluded at the temple built by Mentuhotep II. The procession began at the Eighth Pylon at Karnak led by Hatshepsut and Thutmose III, followed by noblemen and priests bearing Amun's barque, accompanied by musicians, dancers, courtiers, and more priests, and guarded by soldiers. A further flotilla of small boats and the great ship Userhat, which carried the barque, were towed. In Hatshepsut's time, the barque of Amun was a miniaturized copy of a transport barge equipped with three long carrying-poles borne by six priests each. The figure of a ram's head, sacred to Amun, adorned its prow and stern. In the centre of its hull, a lavishly ornamented naos was installed and the statue of Amun, presently bejewelled, cloistered within. The barque likely measured 4.5 m (15 ft) in length. The procession crossed the Nile and visited the cemeteries in remembrance before landing at the valley temple to proceed along the 1 km (0.62 mi) long causeway to the temple proper. Halfway up was the barque station, beyond which more than 100 sandstone sphinxes flanked the path up to the terraces. This is the oldest attested sphinx avenue, though the practice is thought to date to the Old Kingdom. The valley temple and barque station were points at which offerings were made and purification rituals conducted. The procession carried on through the entrance-gate, up the temple's great ramps, and into the sanctuary where the barque and Amun were kept for a night before being returned home to Karnak. On this day, bounteous offerings of food, meat, drink, and flowers were presented on tables to Amun, with smaller quantities reserved for the king. On all other days, priests performed the 'Daily Ritual' upon the statues of Amun and Hatshepsut.

=== Daily ritual ===
Before dawn each morning, a pair of priests visited the temple's well to collect water for transfer to libation vessels. Other priests busied themselves preparing food and drink as offerings to the gods while the head priest, ḥm-nṯr, visited the pr-dwꜣt to be purified and clothed in preparation for the ceremony. The naos containing the cult image of Amun-Re was first purified with incense. At first light, the head priest opened the shrine and prostrated himself before the god, declaring that he had been sent on behalf of the king, while other priests performed recitations. The shrine was purified with water and incense, and a statuette of Maat was presented to the cult image, which was then removed. The statuette was de-clothed, cleared of oil, and placed on a clean sand pile representing benben. Fresh paint was applied to its eyes, anointed with various oils, dressed in new cloth garments, and provided with accessories. Lastly, its face was anointed, and sand was scattered around the chapel before the image was returned to its resting place. By now, the god's breakfast offering was presented to him. A final set of purifications was conducted, and the doors to the shrine closed with the head priest sweeping away his footsteps behind him. The food was also taken away – they were not physically consumed; the god only partook of their essence – to be represented at the chapels of other deities. Each god received essentially the same service. The priests eventually consumed the food in the 'reversion of offerings', wḏb ḫt. More purifying libations were poured, and incense burned at the shrines at noon and in the evening. At other times, hymns were sung, apotropaic rituals performed to protect Amun-Re's barque as it voyaged across the sky, and wax or clay images of enemies destroyed.

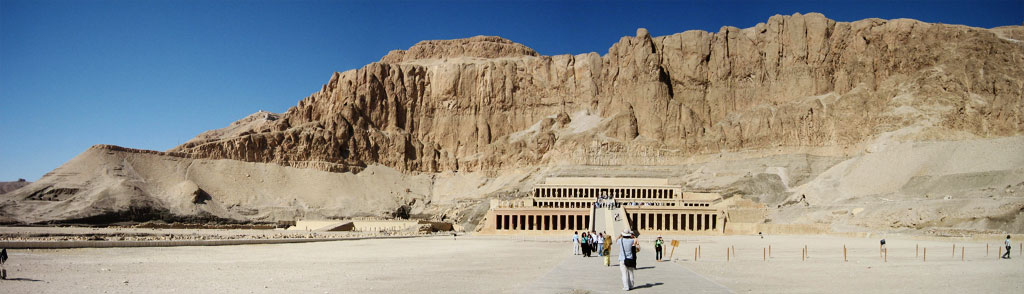
Panoramic view of the mortuary temple

== Later history ==
=== In ancient Egypt ===
==== Proscription of Hatshepsut by Thutmose III ====
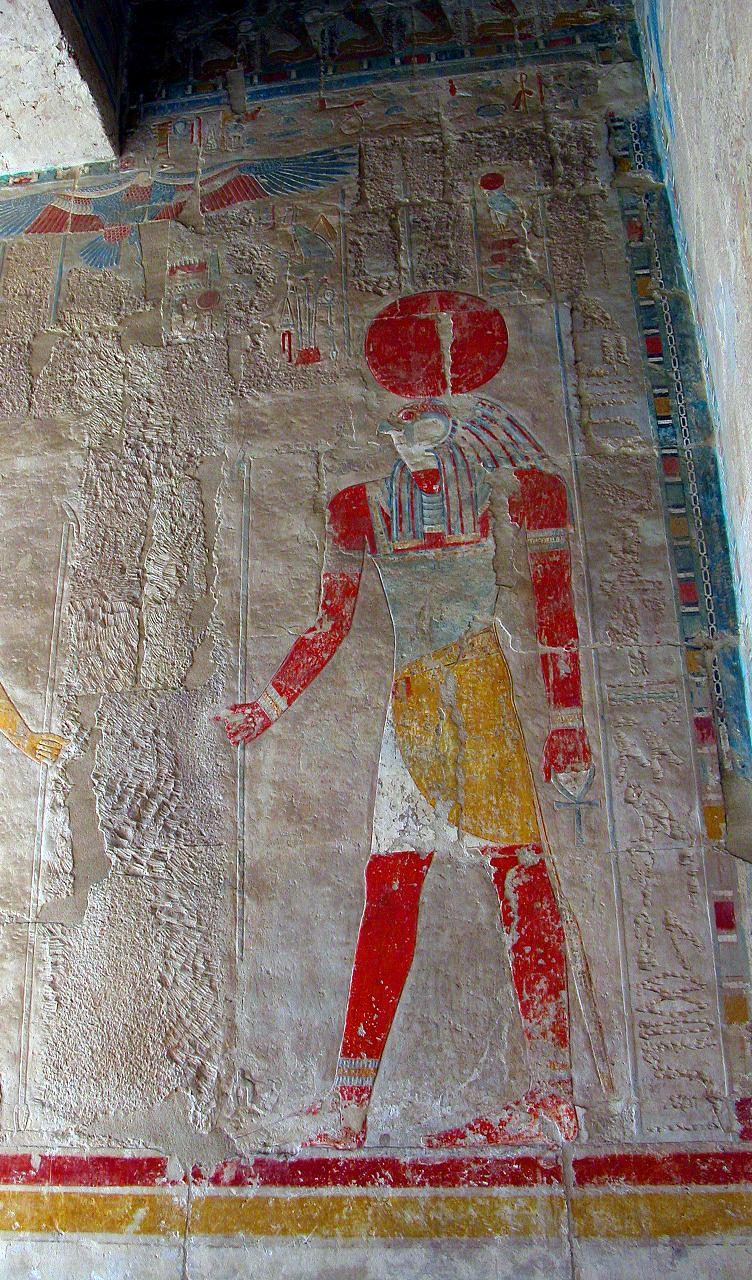
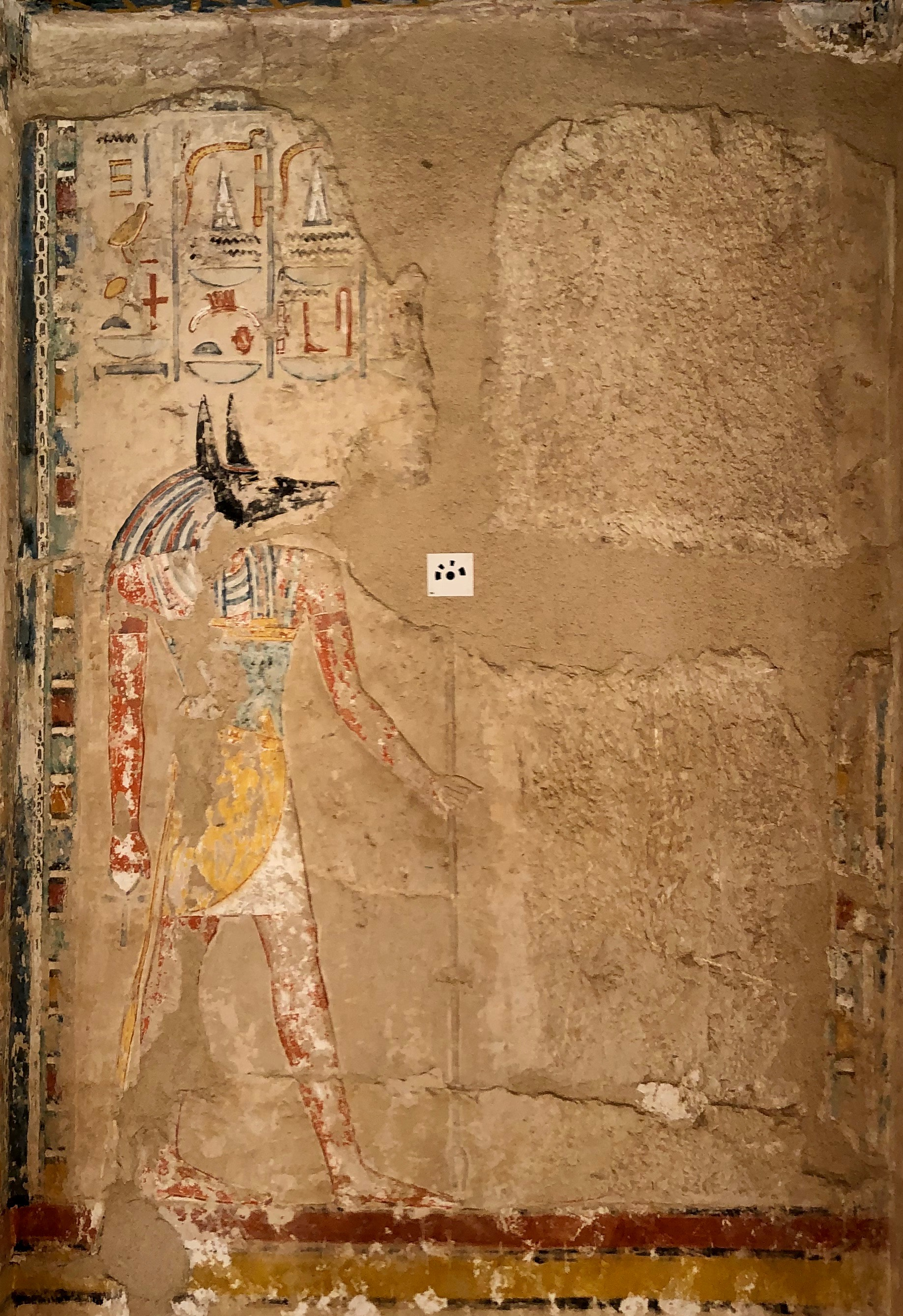
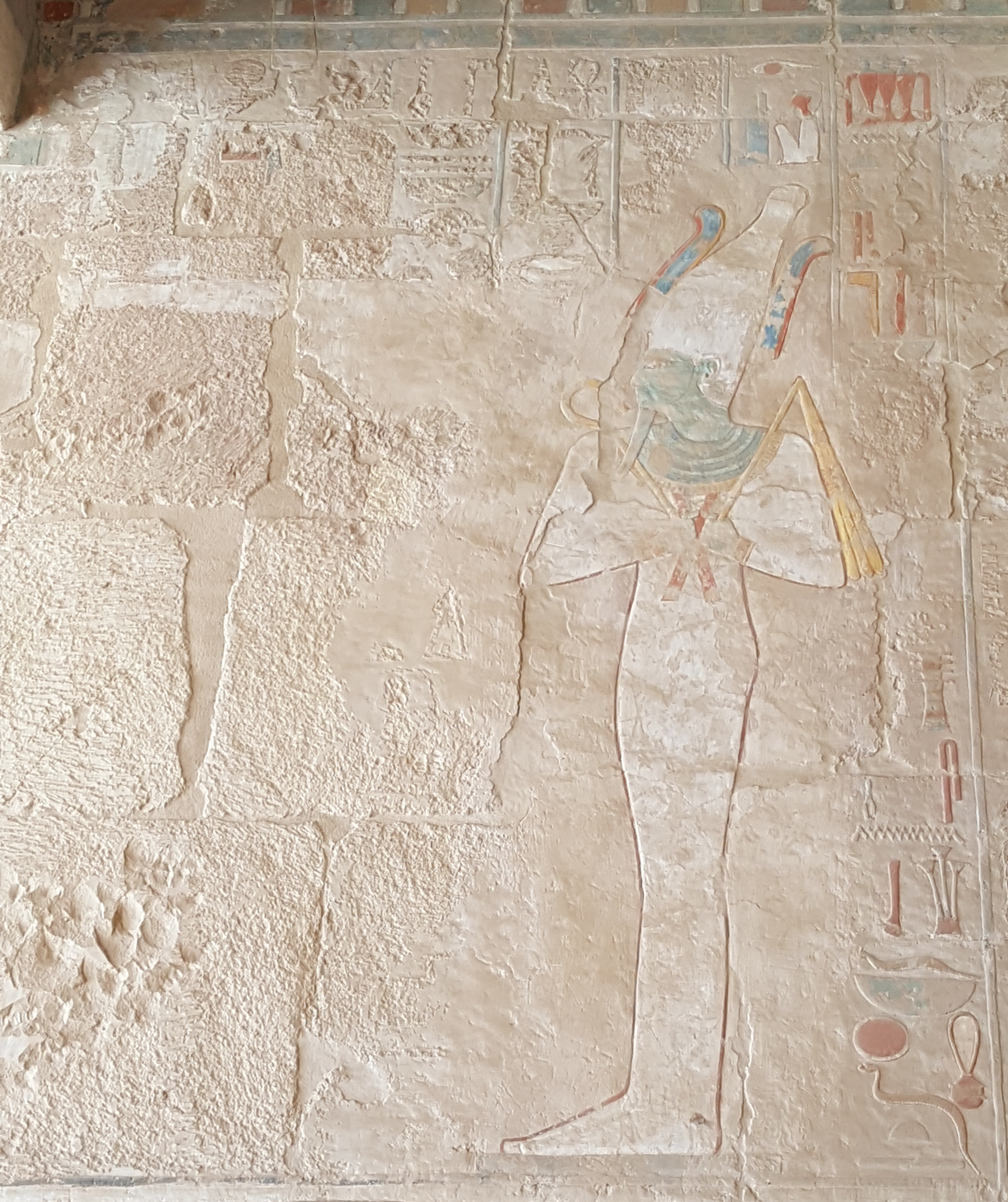
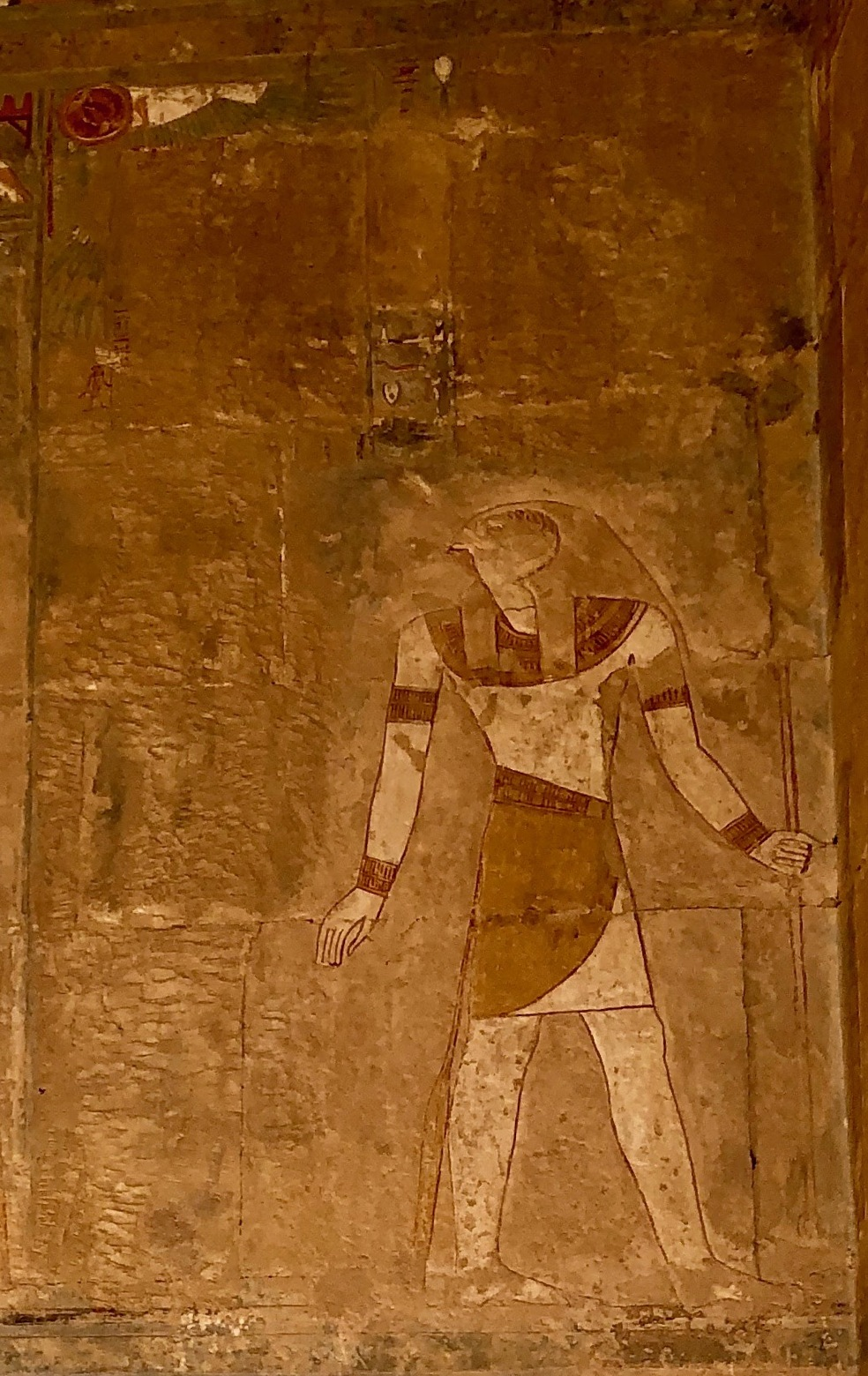
Erasure of images of Hatshepsut giving offerings to Ra, Anubis, Osiris, and Horus, respectively.

Two decades after her death, during Thutmose III's forty-second regnal year, he decided that all evidence of her reign as king of Egypt should be erased. His reasons for proscribing her reign remain unclear. This assault against her reign was, however, short-lived. Two years after it started, when Amenhotep II ascended to the throne, the proscription was abandoned, and much of the erasure was left half-finished.

There are four hypotheses regarding Thutmose III's motivation. The oldest and most dubious is personal revenge. This hypothesis holds that Hatshepsut usurped the throne as sole ruler, relegating Thutmose III, and consequently, he sought to erase her memory. This explanation is unconvincing as the proscription was delayed by two decades and targeted only against her reign as king. The second is that it was a repudiation of the concept of female kingship. The role of a king was closed to women, and her assumption of the role may have presented ideological problems that were resolved via erasure. This may explain the decision to leave images of her as queen intact. The third assesses the possibility of a dynastic dispute between the Ahmosid and Thutmosid lineages. By expunging her rule from the record, Thutmose III may have ensured that his son, Amenhotep II, would ascend the throne. There is, however, no known Ahmosid pretender. The fourth is that Amenhotep II enacted the proscription, as he became a co-regent toward the end of his father's reign, around the same time that the erasure of Hatshepsut began. He had a motive to secure his volatile position in the royal lineage to ensure his elevation to pharaoh. He also usurped many of Hatshepsut's accomplishments during his reign.

Thutmose III employed several methods of erasure at her temple in his campaign. The least damaging was the scratching out of feminine pronouns and suffixes, which otherwise left the text intact. These were commonly used in the Hathor shrine and on the upper terrace. More thorough removal methods included chiselling away, roughening, smoothing, patching, or covering over her image and titles. In other places, her image was replaced with that of an offering table. Occasionally, her image was repurposed for a member of the Thutmosid family. This was most often Thutmose II, although infrequently, her cartouche was replaced with that of Thutmose I or III. The final and most destructive method was the obliteration of statuary in the temple. Workers dragged statues from her temple to one of two designated sites: a quarry – a burrow from which fill material was obtained – and the Hatshepsut Hole. Here, sledgehammers and stone blocks were used to break up the statues, which were then dumped into the chosen repositories.

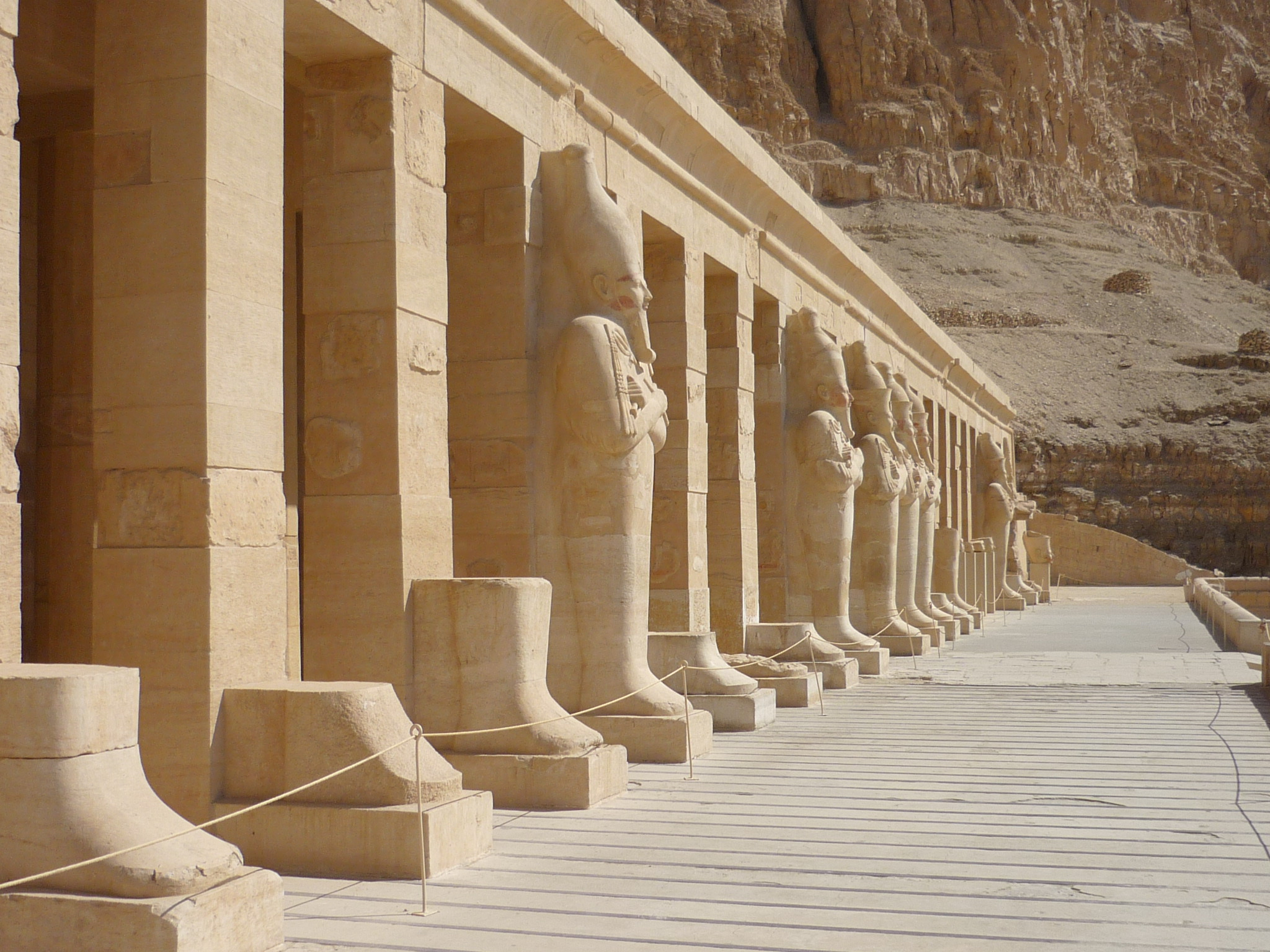
Statues of Hatshepsut were destroyed during Thutmose III's proscription.

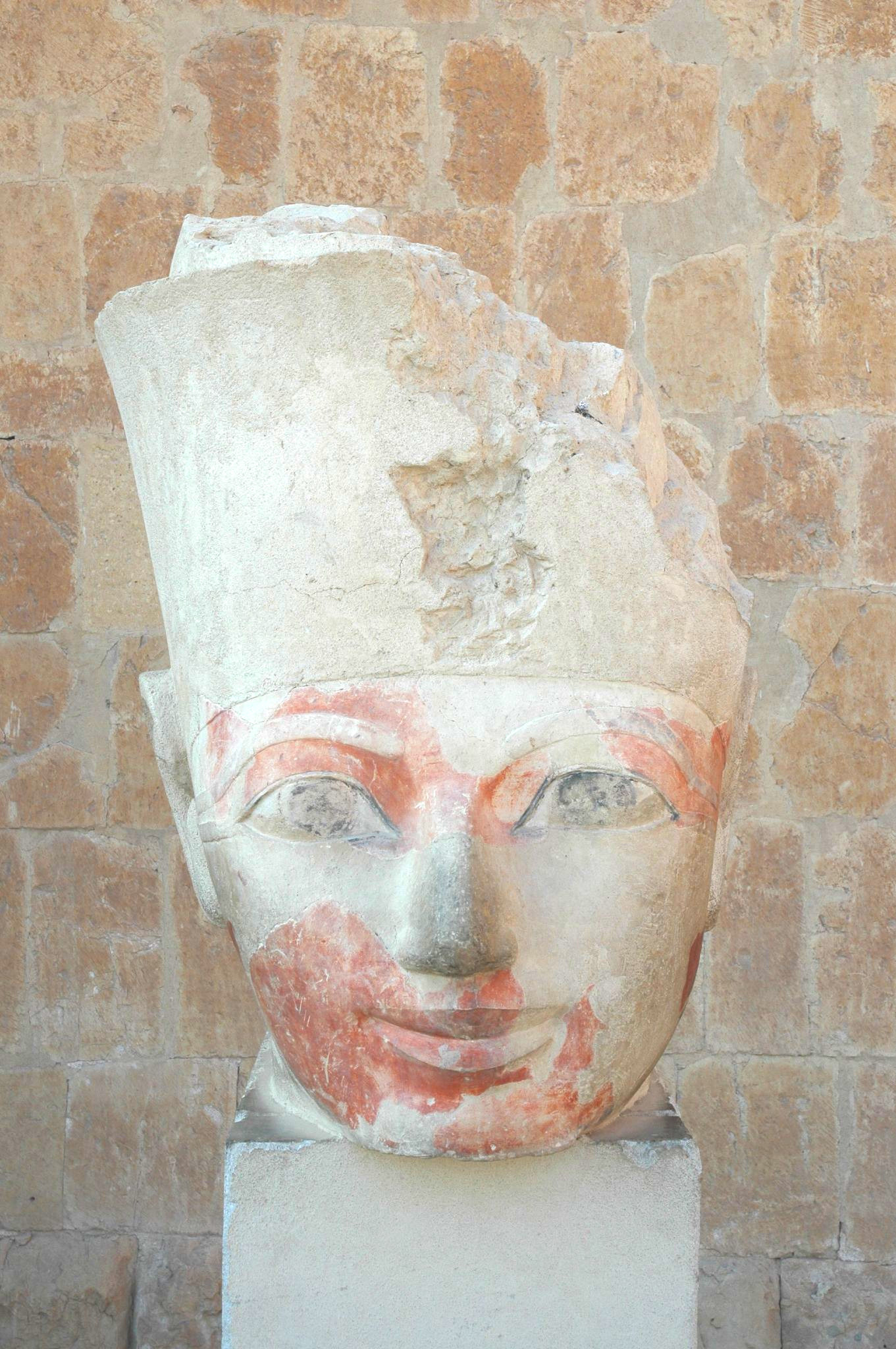
The severed head from a Hatshepsut statue

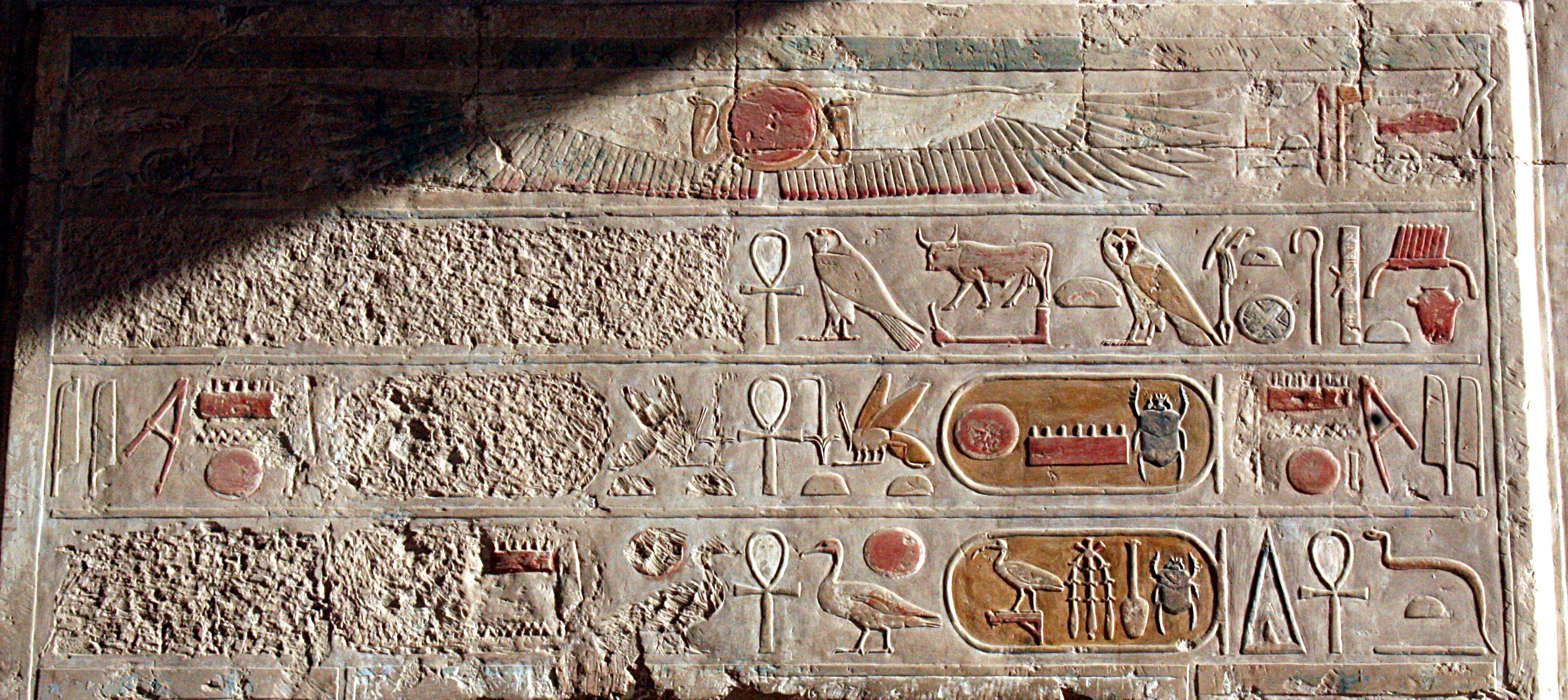
Erasure of Hatshepsut's royal titulary (left) (Note: The left half of the relief was once occupied by the Horus, throne, and birth names of Hatshepsut. The top line has been thoroughly obliterated. Of the middle line, the shapes of nsw-bỉty remain along with text reading ỉmn-rꜥ mrỉ, meaning 'Beloved of Amun-Re', but the cartouche is destroyed. Of the lower line, the glyphs of sꜥ-rꜥ are legible, along with ỉmn, a fragment of ỉmn-ẖnmt–ḥꜣt-špswt.) with Thutmose III's royal titulary (right) (Note: The names in lines 1 to 3 bear the Horus name kꜣ-nḫt-ḫꜥ-m-wꜣst, throne name mn-ḫpr-rꜥ, and the birth name ḏḥwty-ms nfr-ḫpr.) left intact

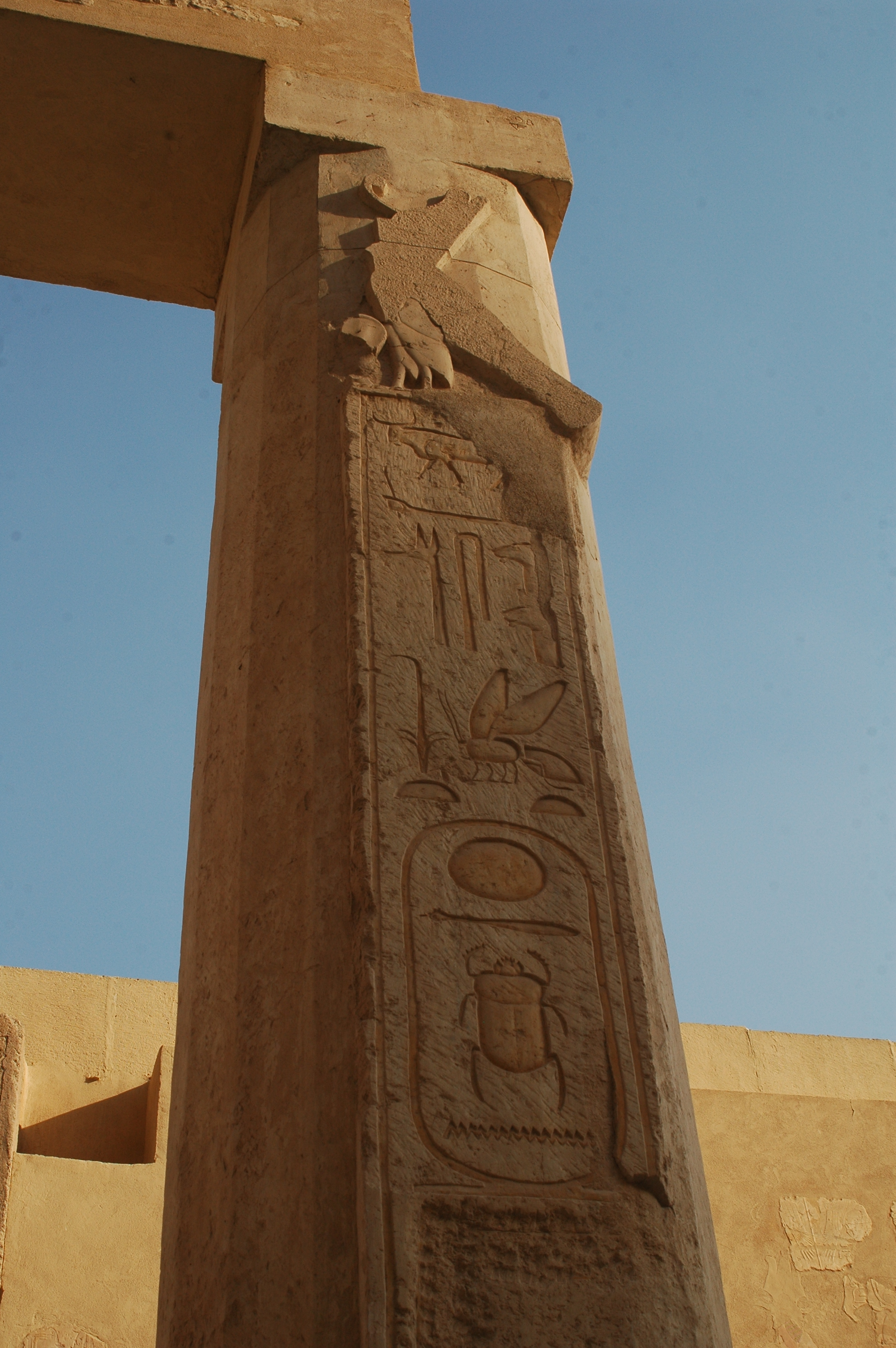
A column re-inscribed with ꜥꜣ-ḫpr-n-rꜥ, Thutmose II's throne name

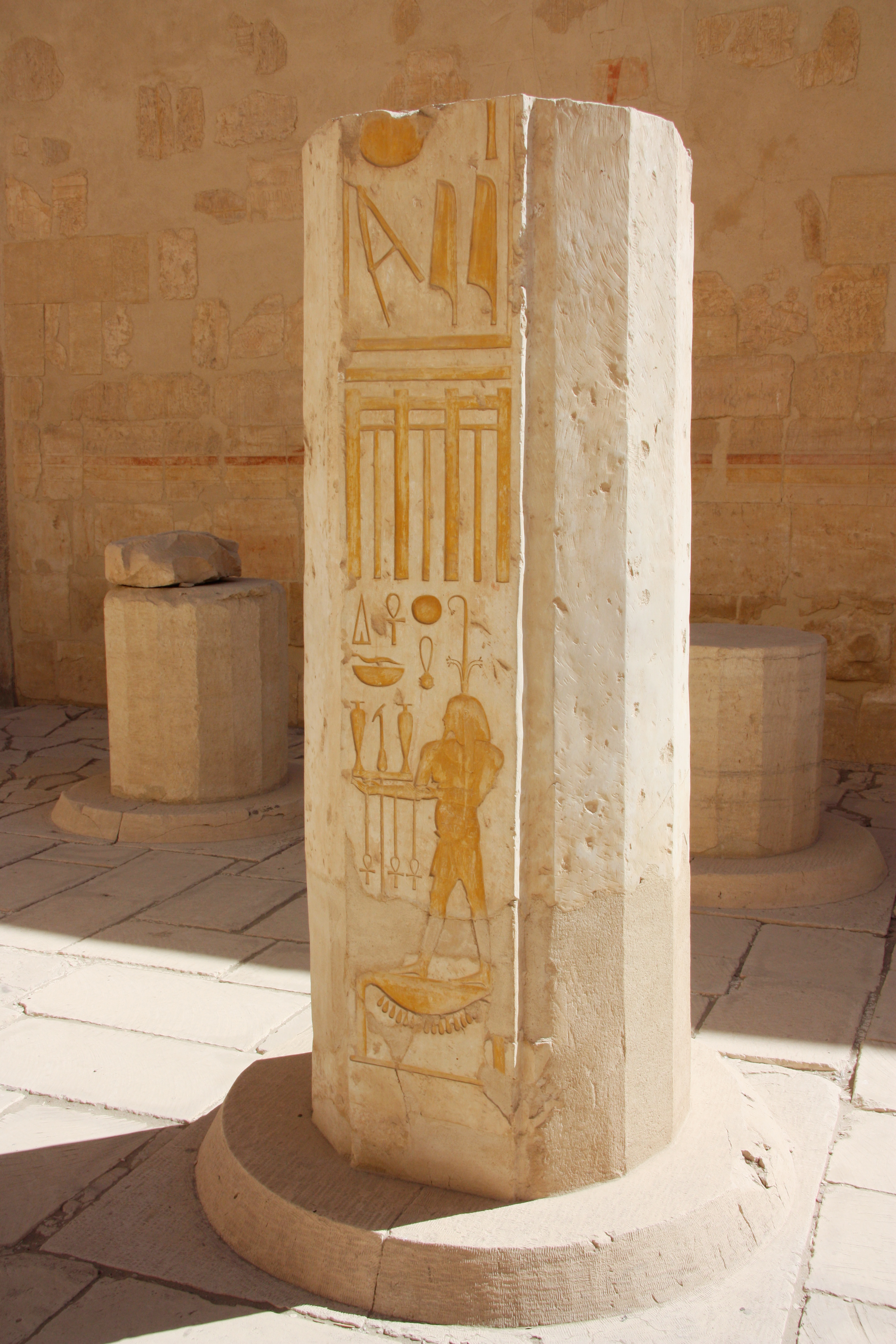
A broken column with a partial serekh bearing the signs for mrỉ-rꜥ of one of Thutmose III's Horus names

==== Proscription during the Amarna Period ====
The temple continued to serve as a worship site following Thutmose III's death. During the Amarna Period, further erasure of the reliefs was inflicted by order of Akhenaten, albeit the target of this persecution were images of the gods, particularly Amun. Early in his reign, Aten, a solar deity, was elevated to the status of a supreme god. The persecution of other gods did not begin immediately; instead reform proceeded gradually for several years before culminating in prohibition around his ninth regnal year. In addition to Amun, the proscription coincides with the ostracization of other gods like Set and Horus. The images of Amun and Horus were restored during the reigns of Tutankhamun, Horemheb, and Ramesses II, who made additions and reinscribed several remaining cartouches of Hatshepsut with those of Thutmose III.

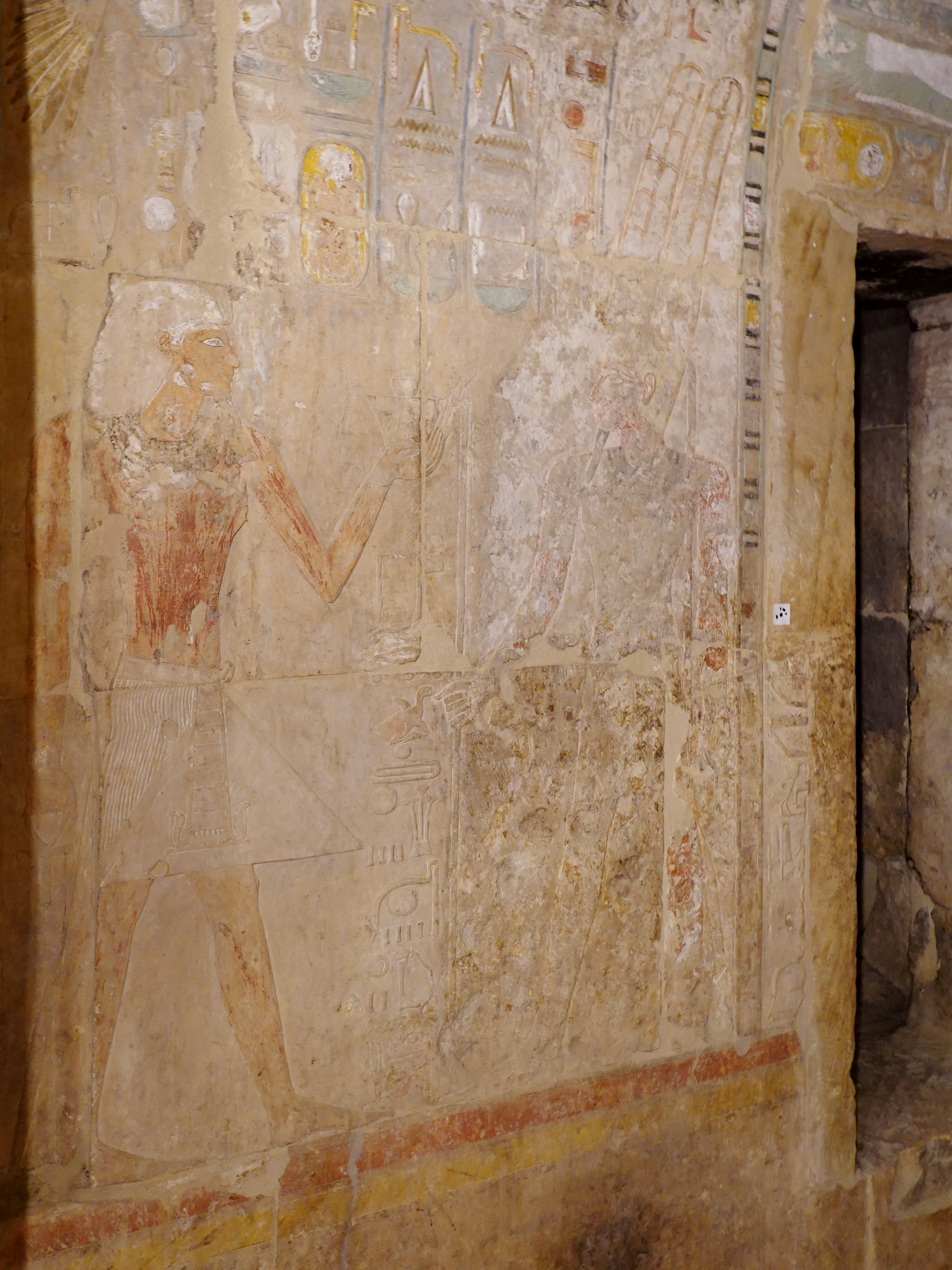
Erasure of Amun (right figure) by order of Akhenaten in the second proscription, later restored

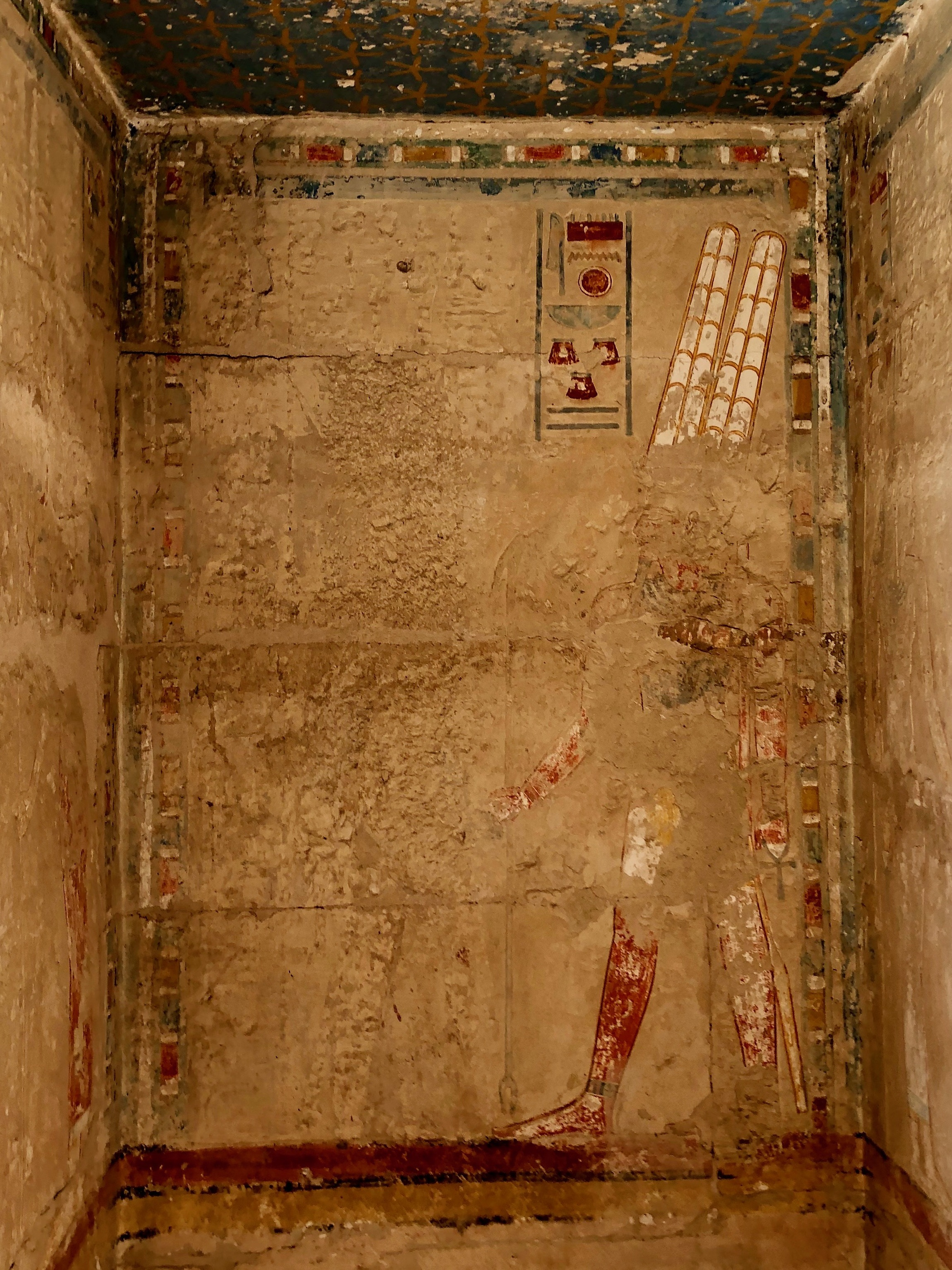
Erasure of a relief of Hatshepsut giving offerings to Amun, with the latter figure later restored

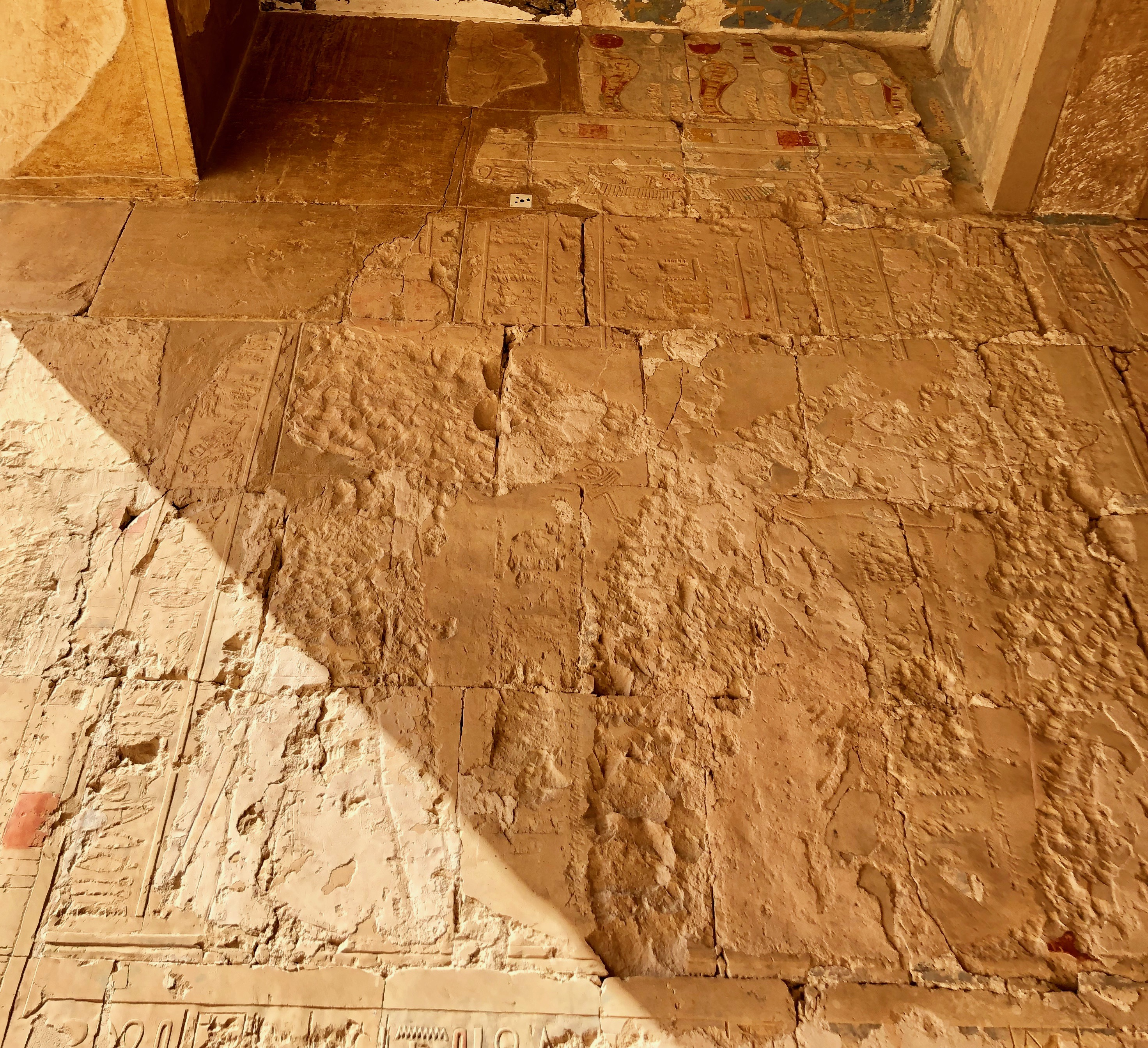
Erasure of a relief of Ra (left) and Amun (right) blessing Hatshepsut.

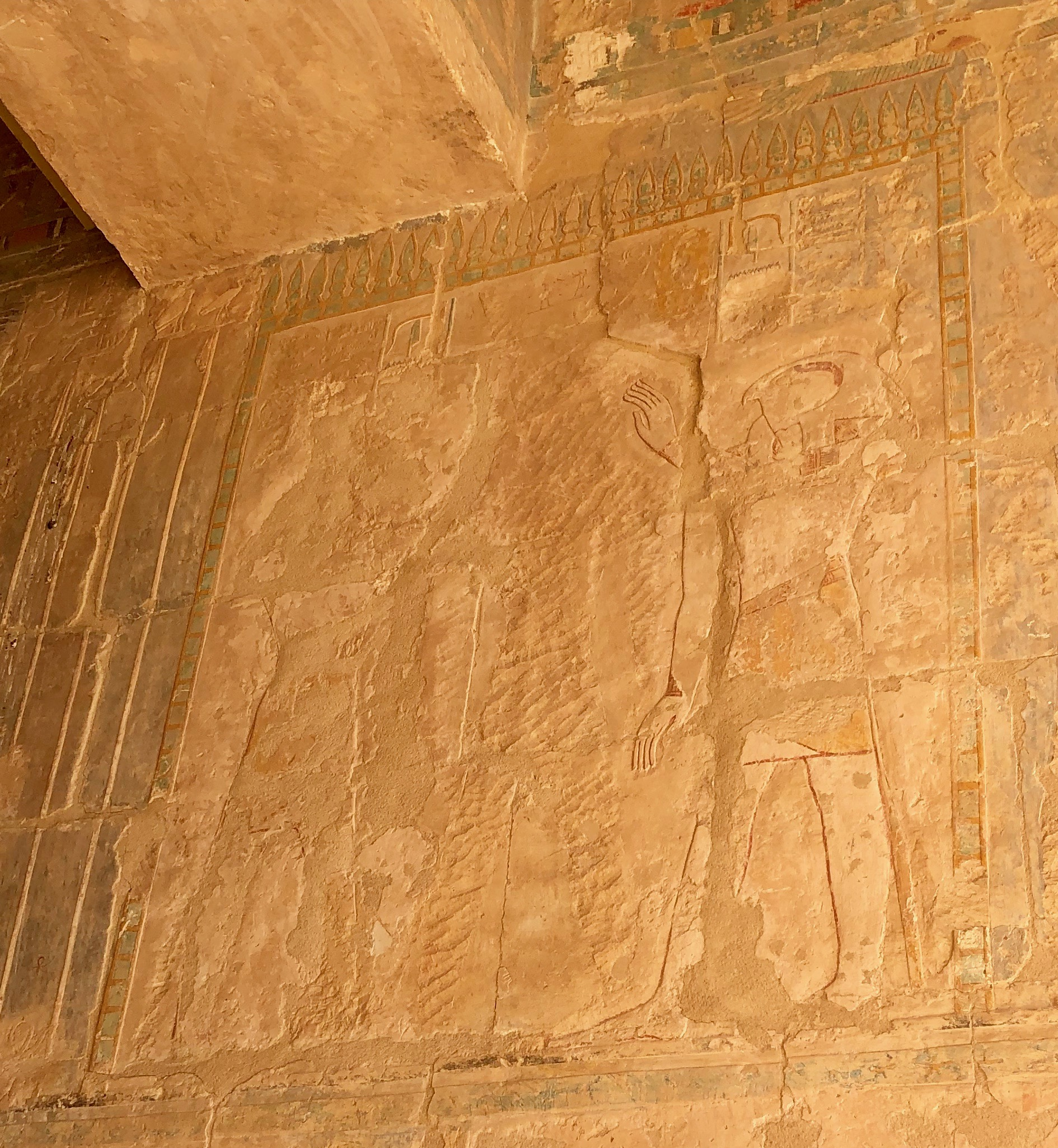
Erasure of a relief of Set (left) and Horus (right) blessing Hatshepsut. Only the figure of Horus was later restored.

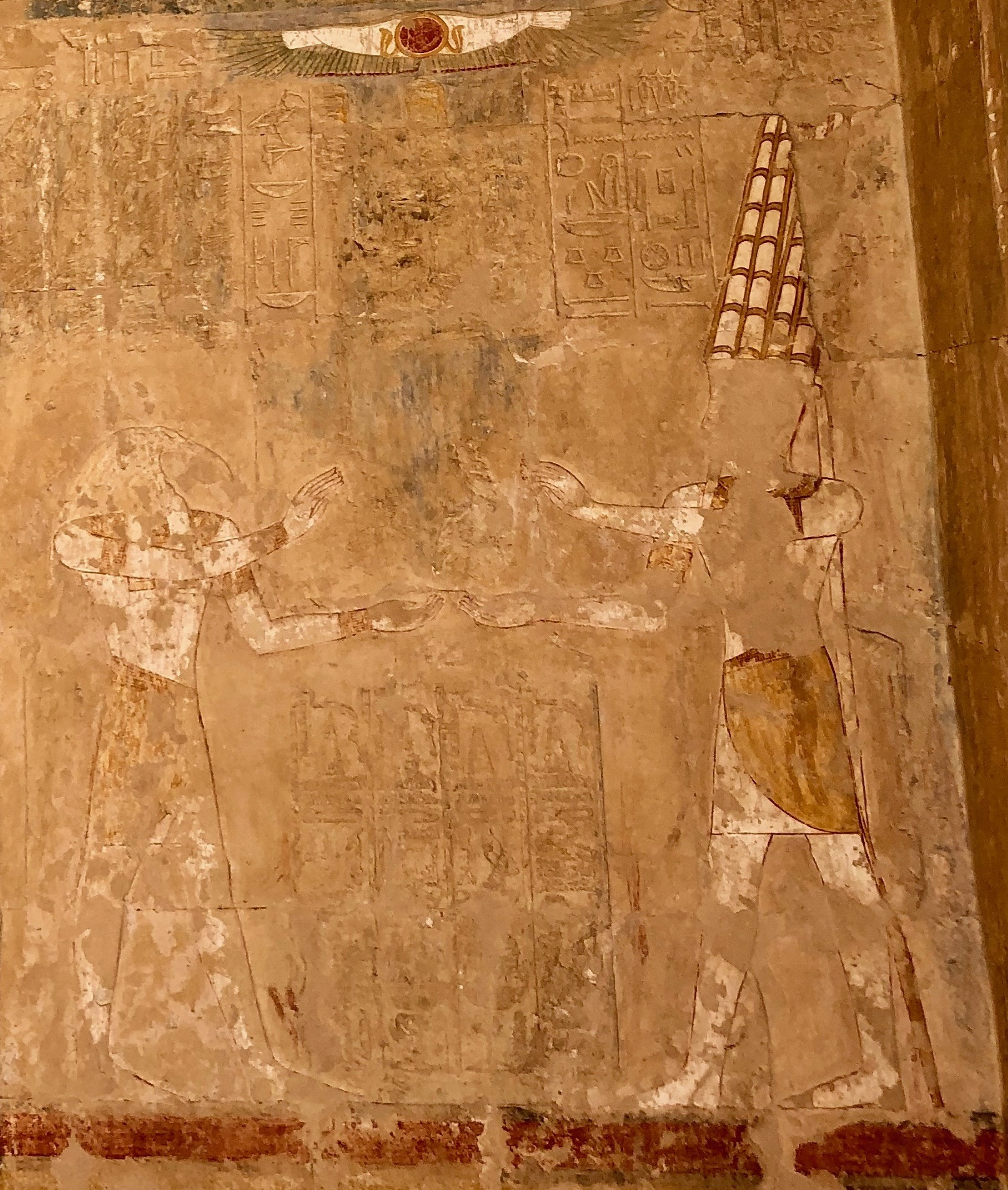
Relief of Thoth (left) and Amun (right) carved over the proscribed images of Set and Horus blessing Hatshepsut

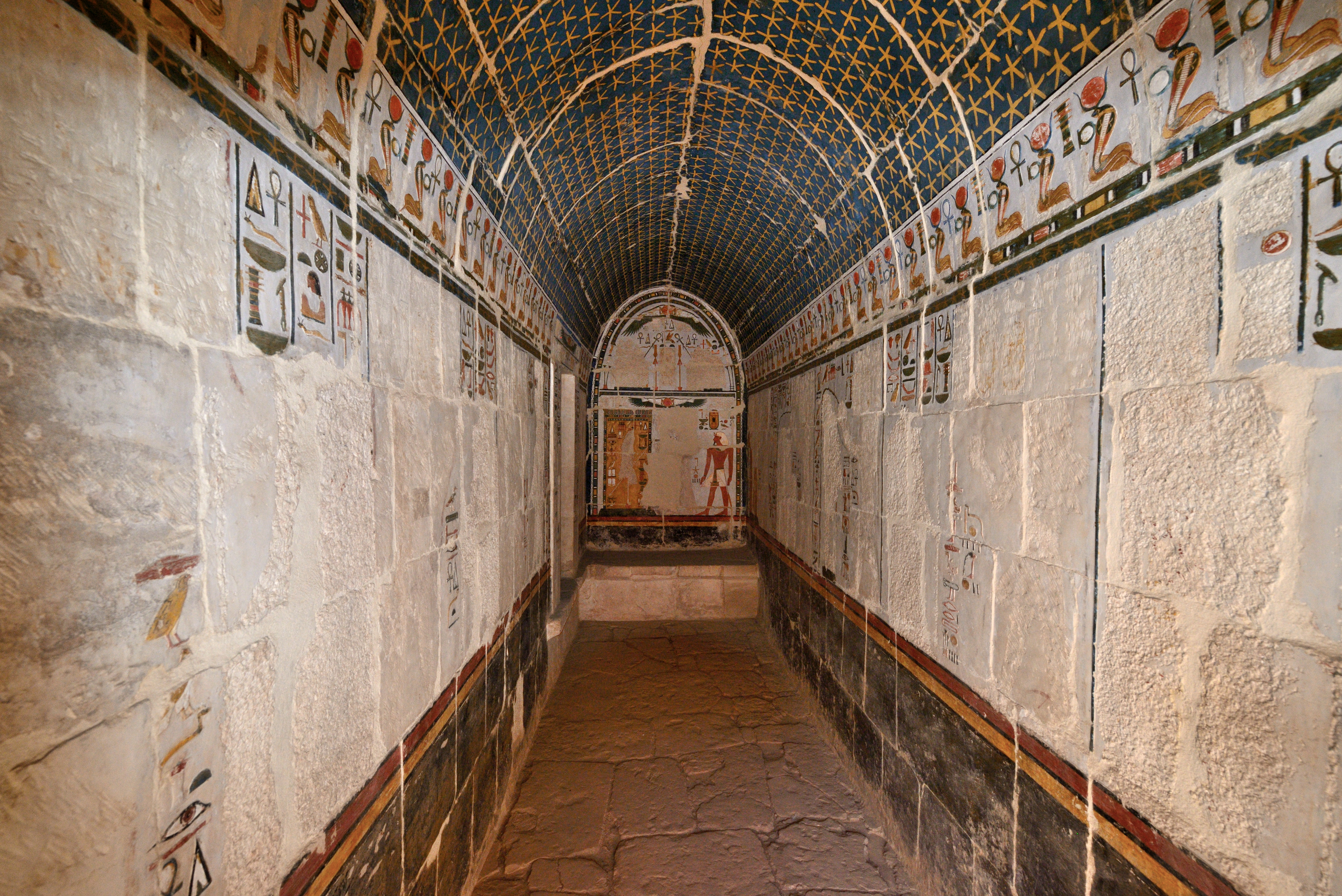
The two proscriptions have left the corridor of the upper Anubis shrine with a solitary figure, that of Thutmose I at the far end

==== Third Intermediate Period ====
The temple was damaged further by an earthquake in the ninth century BC, during the Third Intermediate Period. During this time, between the Twenty-First and Twenty-Fifth Dynasties, the temple was used as a burial ground for priests of the cults of Amun and Montu, as well as for members of the royal family. Around this time, a tomb (TT320) in a hidden recess in the cliffs to the south of the temple was carved to contain a cache of forty royal mummies, moved there from the Valley of the Kings by Twenty-first Dynasty priests, most likely to prevent further desecration and looting. The mummy of Thutmose III himself was included in the cache.

==== Ptolemaic era ====
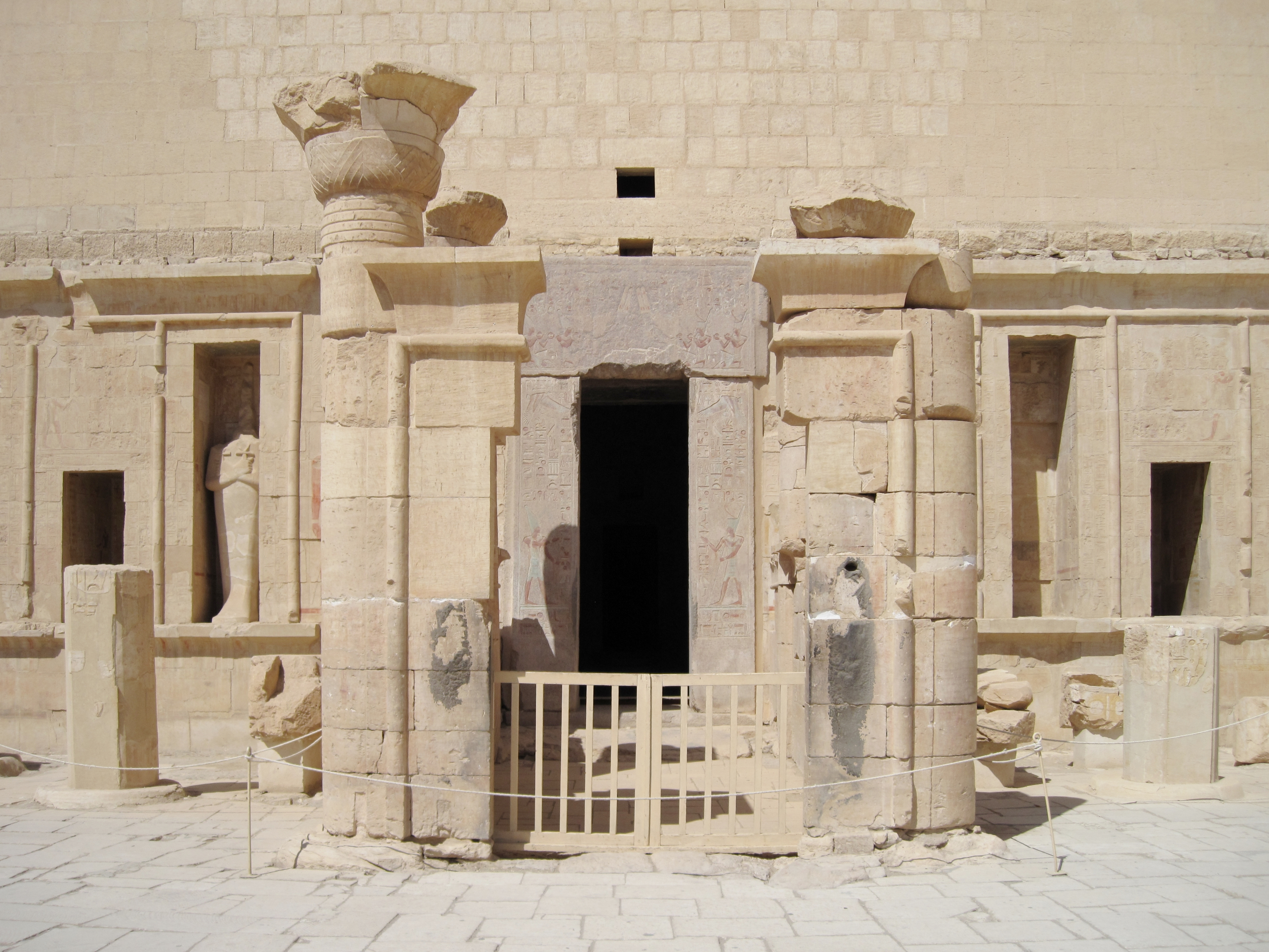
Ptolemaic portico of the festival courtyard

During the reign of Ptolemy III Euergetes, a stone chapel was built on the middle terrace for Asklepios, a god of the Greek pantheon. Later, under Ptolemy VIII Euergetes, the sanctuary of Amun was significantly altered. The cult statue chamber was converted into a chapel for Amenhotep, son of Hapu, the Eighteenth Dynasty architect of Amenhotep III, Imhotep, the Third Dynasty vizier of Djoser, and Hygieia, the Greek goddess of hygiene. In the barque hall, the two centre niches were filled and the skylight blocked. The sanctuary entrance was outfitted with a portico carried by six columns.

=== Beyond ancient Egypt ===
After the Ptolemaic kingdom, the temple was used as a site of local worship. Between the 6th and 8th centuries AD, a Coptic monastery of Saint Phoibammon was constructed on the temple grounds. Figures of Christ and other saints were painted over the original relief work with the temple. A pilgrim left the latest dated graffito in c. 1223.

=== Archaeological excavations ===
The earliest modern visitor to the temple was Richard Pococke, an English traveller, in 1737. He was followed by François Jollois and Renée Edouard Devilliers, two members of Napoleon Bonaparte's expedition, in 1798. The earliest archaeological findings were made around 1817 by Giovanni Battista Belzoni and Henry William Beechey, who scavenged the site for artefacts to present to Henry Salt, the British consul. Another visitor to the site, in 1823–1825, Henry Westcar is credited with the earliest printed reference to the name Deir el-Bahari. In the following decades, John Gardner Wilkinson, Jean-François Champollion and Karl Richard Lepsius each visited the site. The earliest significant excavations occurred in the 1850s and 60s under Auguste Mariette. Under his supervision, the remains of the monastery of Saint Phoibammon were destroyed, and the shrines to Hathor and Anubis, as well as the south colonnade of the middle terrace, were revealed. During the Egypt Exploration Fund's (EEF) expedition, under Édouard Naville and his assistant Howard Carter, from 1893–1906, the entire temple was excavated. The seven volumes of Naville's work form a fundamental source of information for the temple. In 1911–1936, the Metropolitan Museum of Art (MMA) funded excavation works under the direction of Herbert E. Winlock. In 1925–1952, a team led by Émile Baraize for the Egyptian Antiquities Service reconstructed significant portions of the temple. Since 1961, the Polish Center of Mediterranean Archeology (PCMA) of Warsaw University in Cairo has been engaged in restoration and consolidation efforts at the site.

The Polish-Egyptian Archaeological and Conservation Expedition was established by Kazimierz Michałowski after he was approached by the Supreme Council of Antiquities (SCA). The project was initially constrained to reconstructing the third terrace, but since 1967, the mission has included the entire temple. Patryk Chudzik presently directs the project. The site is being gradually opened to tourism. Since 2000, visitors have been open to the festival courtyard, upper terrace, and coronation portico. In 2015, the solar cult court and, in 2017, the sanctuary of Amun were also opened to visitors.

Restoration of the Mortuary temple of Hatshepsut

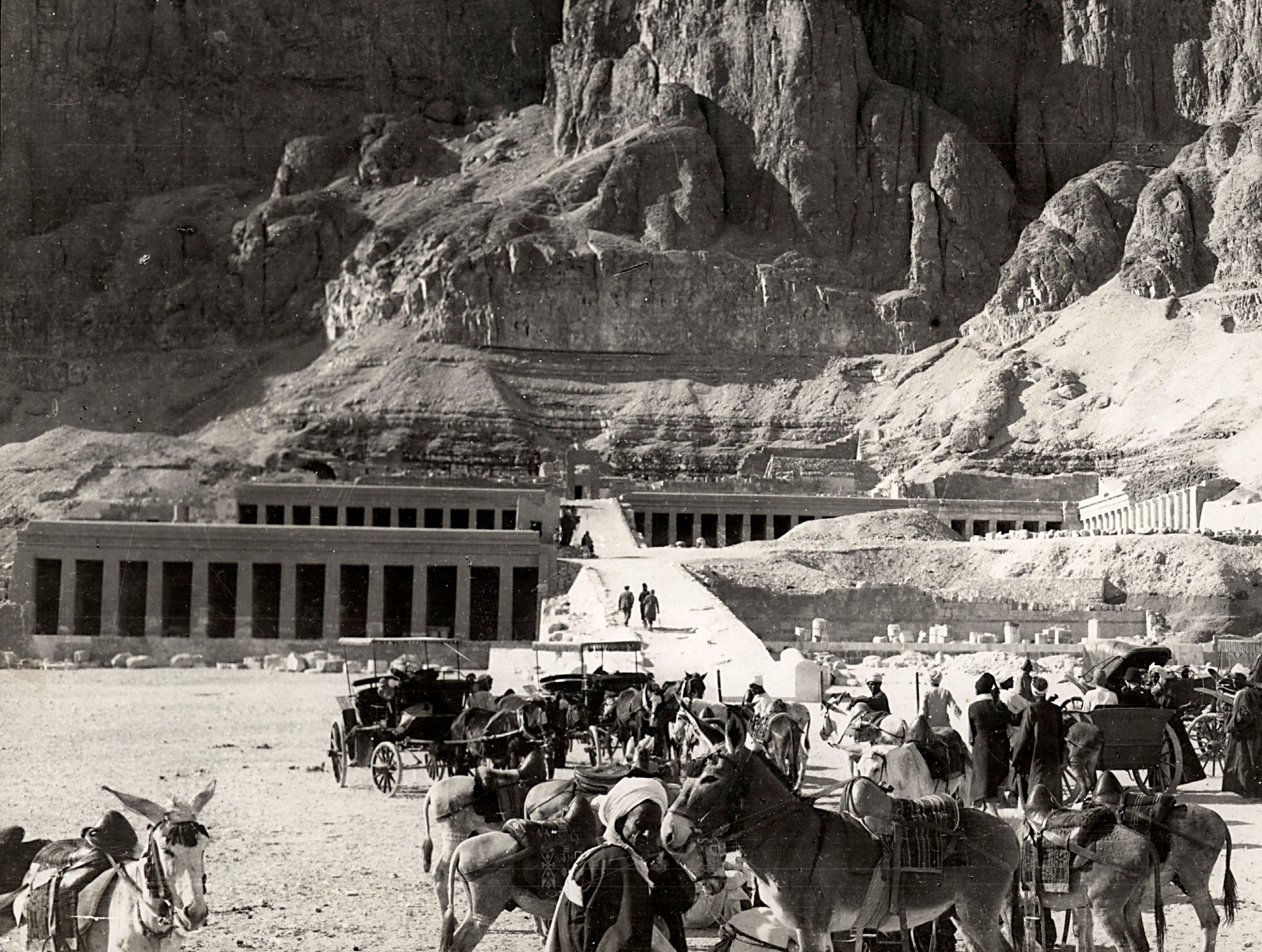
1927

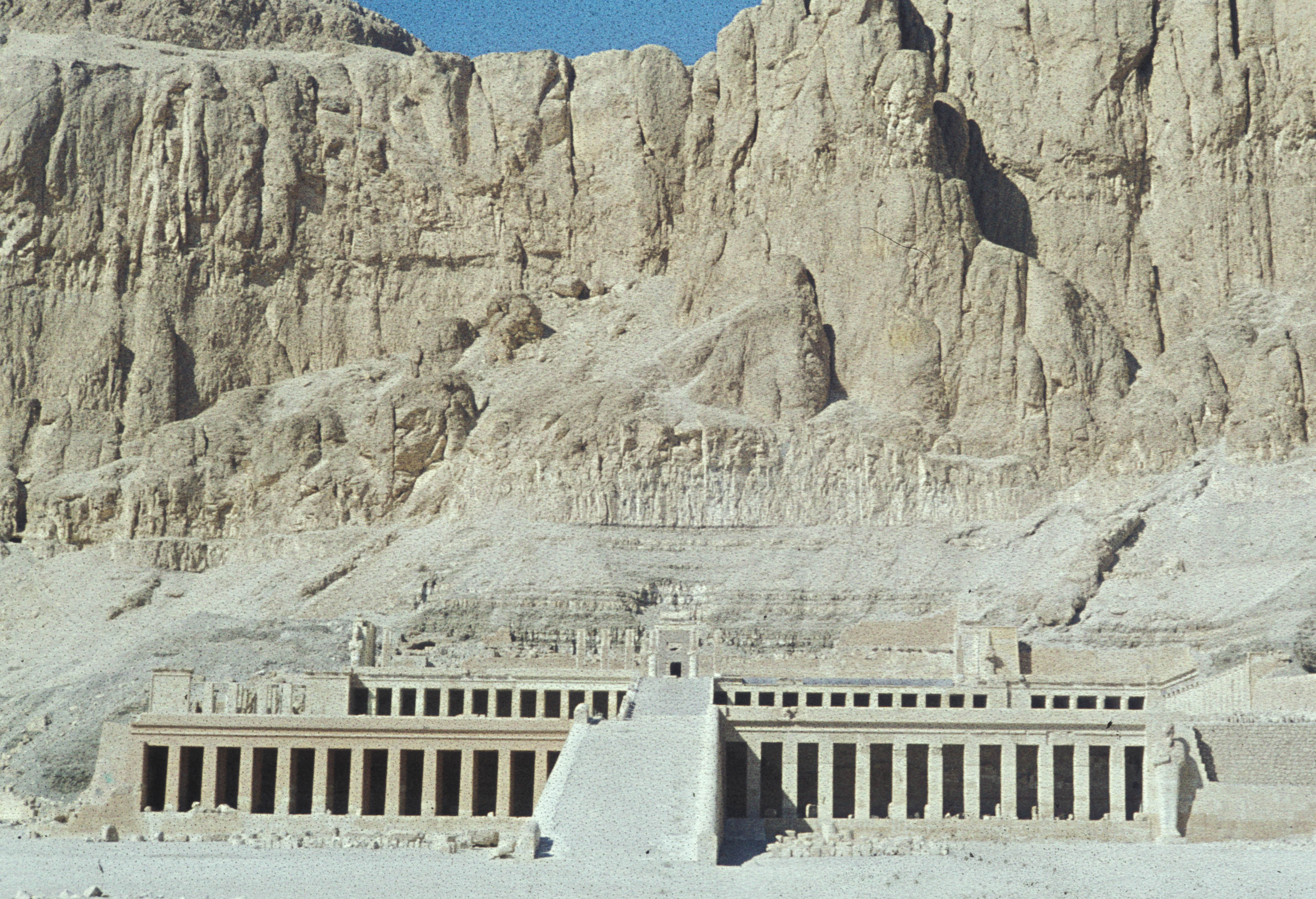
1959

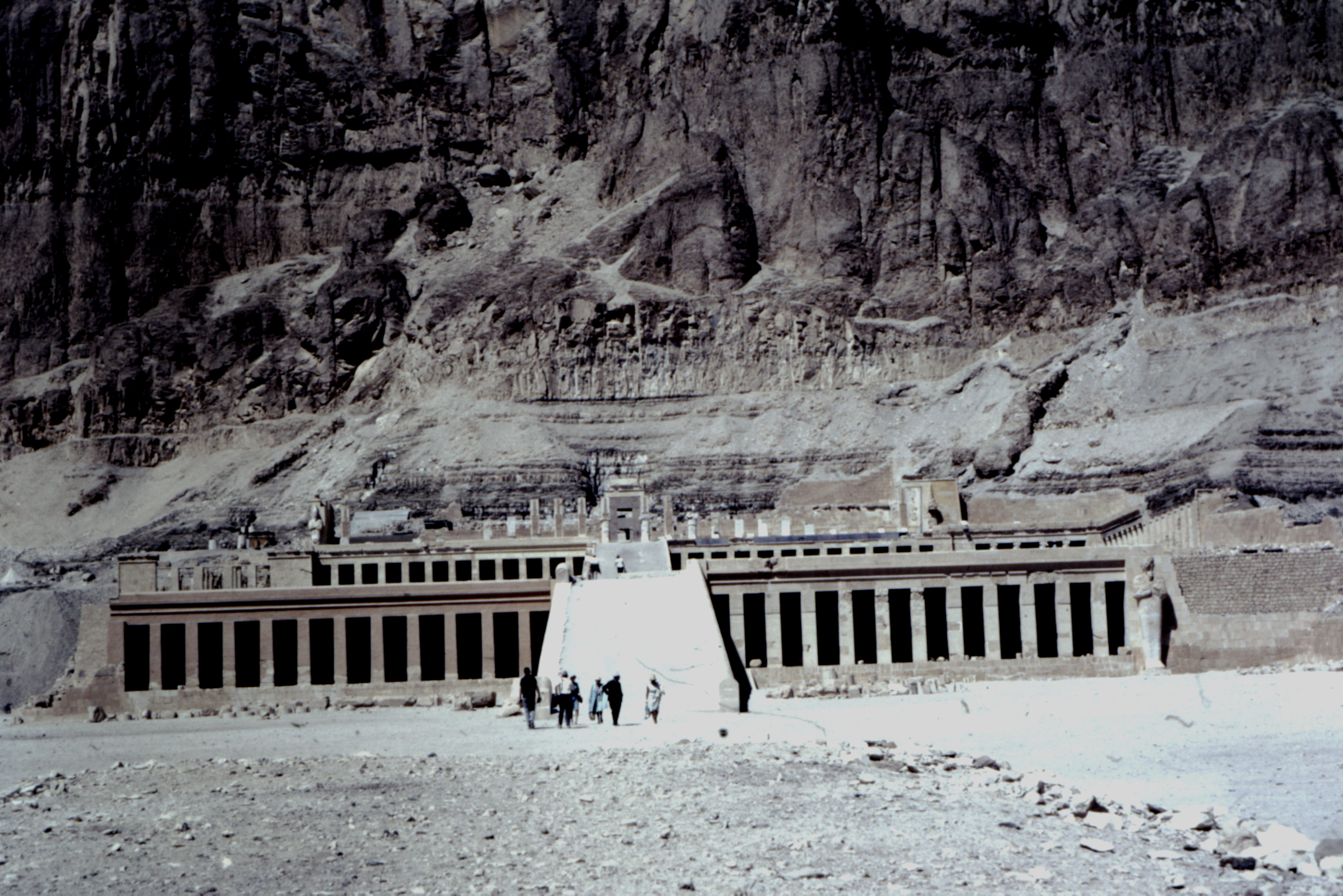
1967

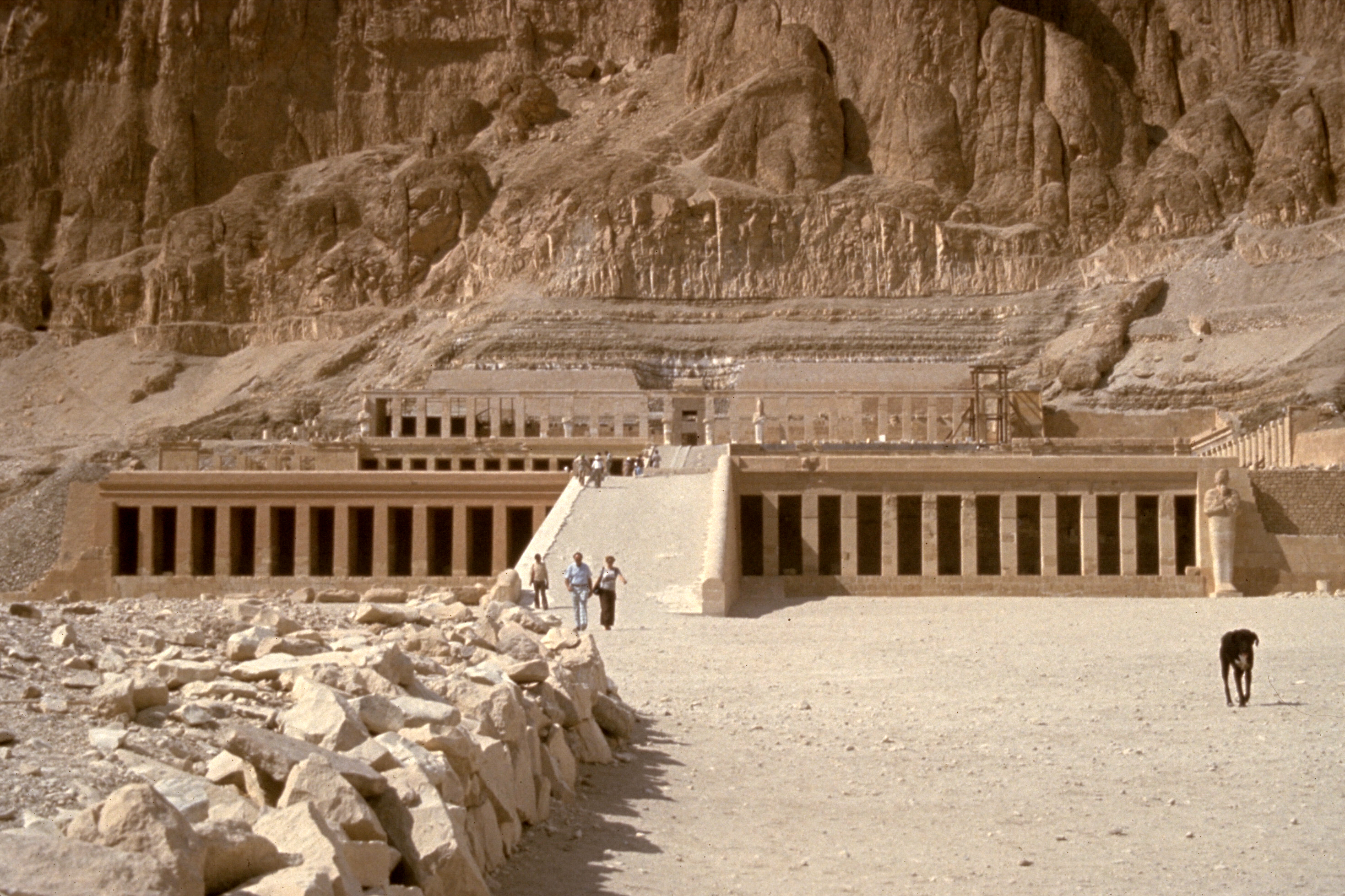
1980

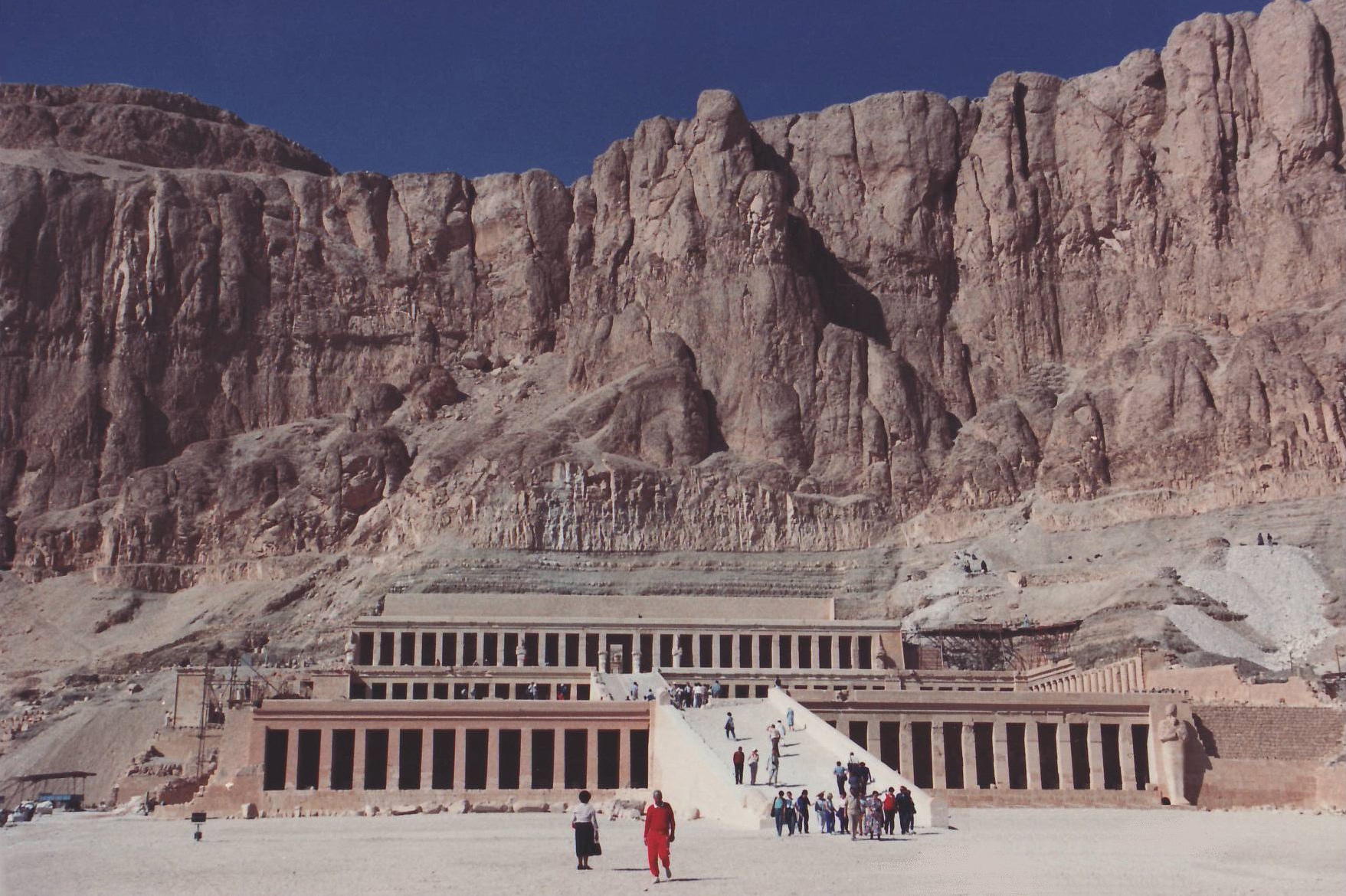
1987

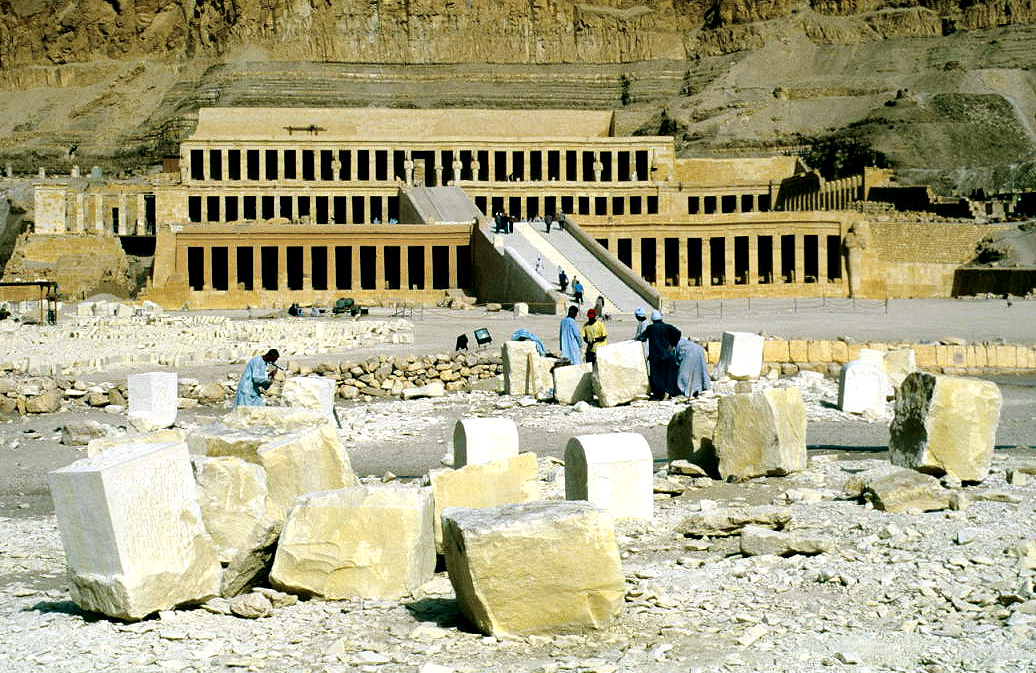
1999

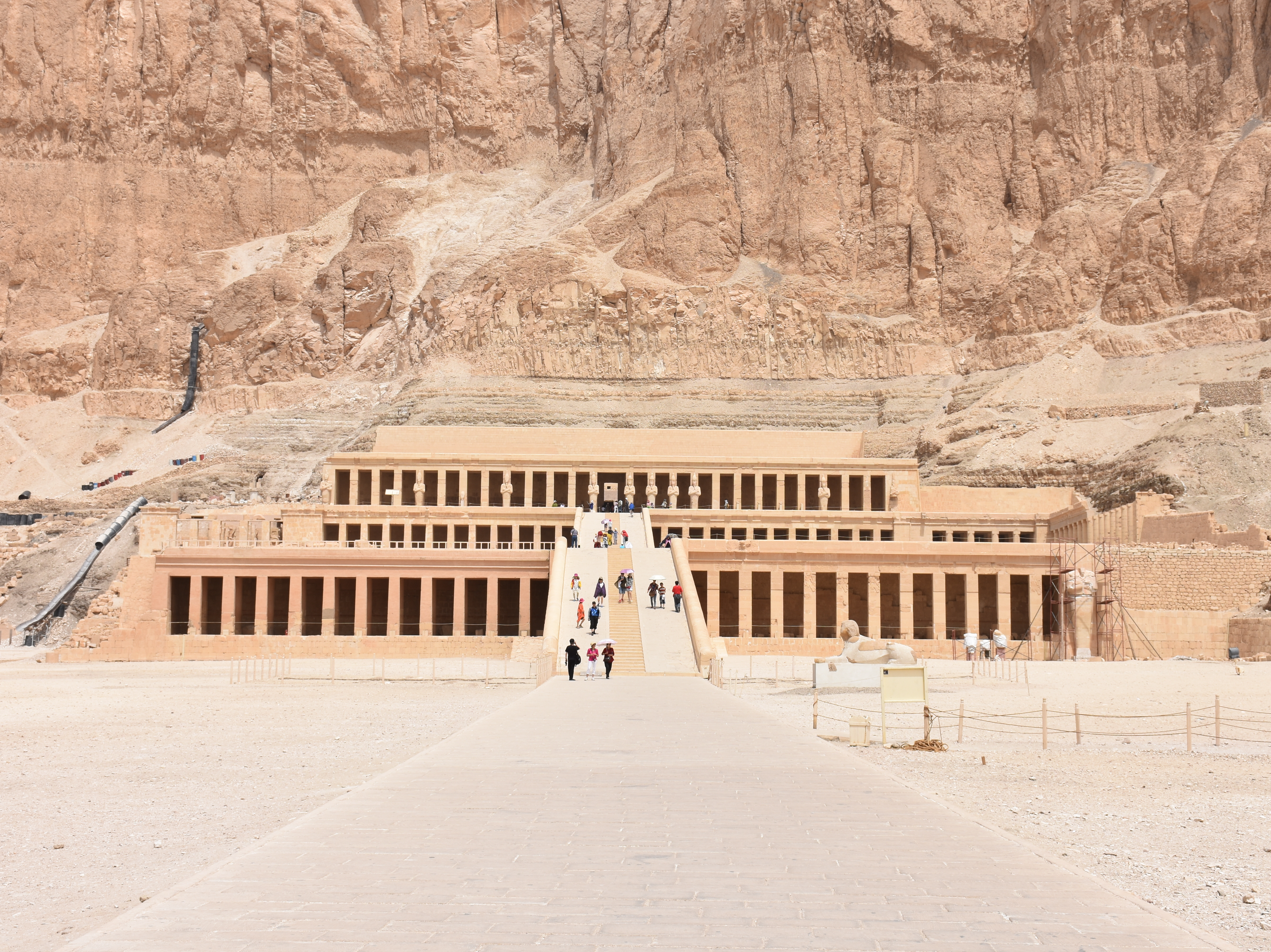
2015

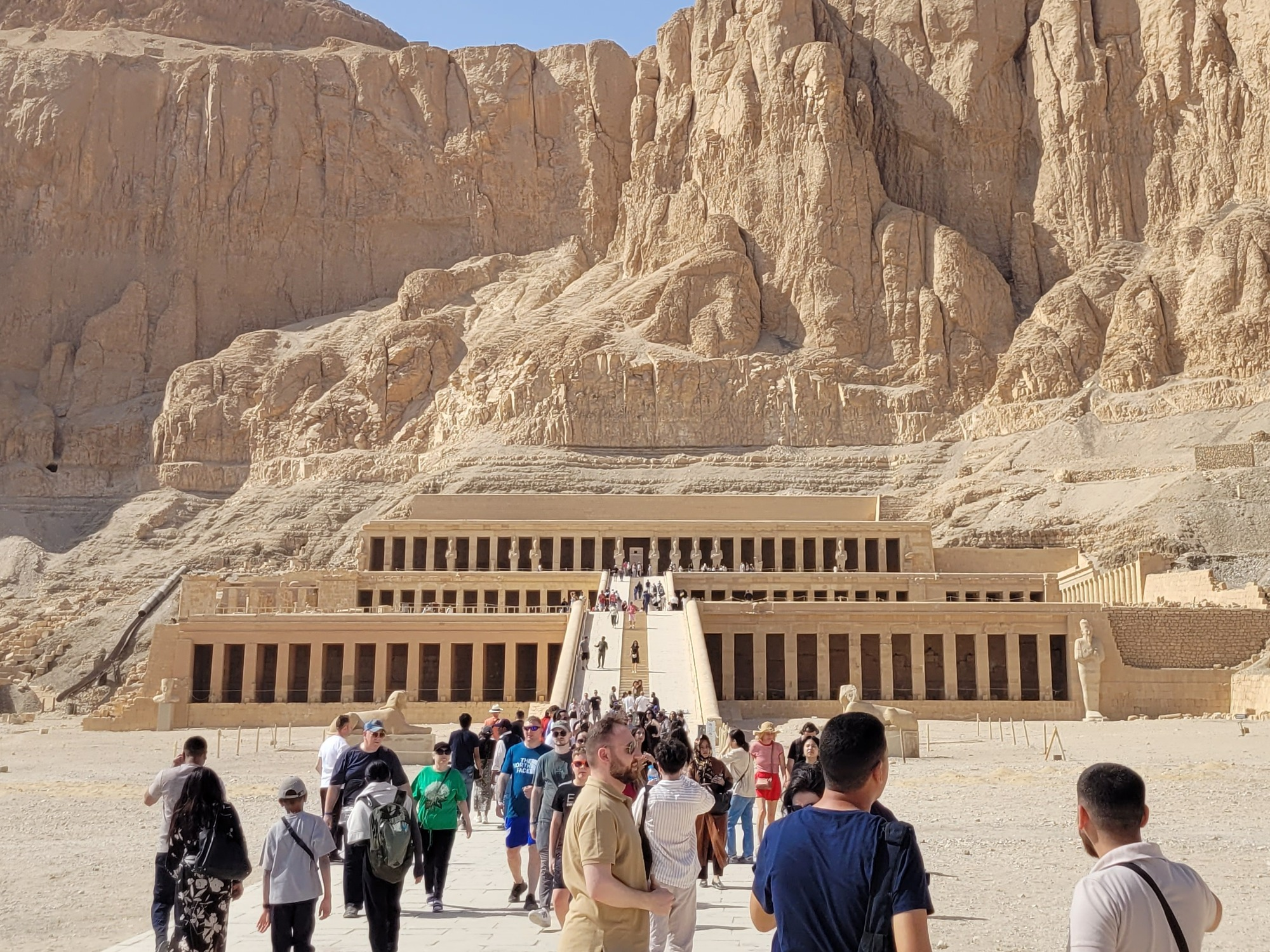
2025

== See also ==
- List of ancient Egyptian sites
- Luxor massacre

== Sources ==
- Allen, James P. (2005). "The Role of Amun". In Roehrig, Catharine (ed.). Hatshepsut From Queen to Pharaoh. New York: Metropolitan Museum of Art. pp. 83–85. ISBN 1-58839-173-6.
- Arnold, Dieter (2003). The Encyclopaedia of Ancient Egyptian Architecture. London: I.B. Tauris. ISBN 978-1-86064-465-8.
- Arnold, Dieter (2005a). "The Temple of Hatshepsut at Deir el-Bahri". In Roehrig, Catharine (ed.). Hatshepsut From Queen to Pharaoh. New York: Metropolitan Museum of Art. pp. 135–140. ISBN 1-58839-173-6.
- Arnold, Dorothea (2005b). "The Destruction of the Statues of Hatshepsut from Deir el-Bahri". In Roehrig, Catharine (ed.). Hatshepsut From Queen to Pharaoh. New York: Metropolitan Museum of Art. pp. 270–276. ISBN 1-58839-173-6.
- Arnold, Dorothea (2005c). "A Chronology: The Later History and Excavations of the Temple of Hatshepsut at Deir el-Bahri". In Roehrig, Catharine (ed.). Hatshepsut From Queen to Pharaoh. New York: Metropolitan Museum of Art. pp. 290–293. ISBN 1-58839-173-6.
- Bárta, Miroslav (2005). "Location of the Old Kingdom Pyramids in Egypt". Cambridge Archaeological Journal. 15 (2): 177–191. doi:10.1017/s0959774305000090. S2CID 161629772.
- Bryan, Betsy M. (2003). "The 18th Dynasty before the Amarna Period (c. 1550–1352 BC)". In Shaw, Ian (ed.). The Oxford History of Ancient Egypt. Oxford: Oxford University Press. pp. 207–264. ISBN 978-0-19-815034-3.
- Clayton, Peter A. (1994). Chronicle of the Pharaohs. London: Thames & Hudson. ISBN 978-0-500-05074-3.
- Ćwiek, Andrzej (2014). "Old and Middle Kingdom Tradition in the Temple of Hatshepsut at Deir el-Bahari". Études et Travaux. 27. Instytut Kultur Śródziemnomorskich i Orientalnych: 62–93. ISSN 2449-9579.
- Dodson, Aidan; Hilton, Dyan (2004). The Complete Royal Families of Ancient Egypt. London: Thames & Hudson. ISBN 0-500-05128-3.
- Dorman, Peter (2005). "The Proscription of Hatshepsut". In Roehrig, Catharine (ed.). Hatshepsut From Queen to Pharaoh. New York: Metropolitan Museum of Art. pp. 267–269. ISBN 1-58839-173-6.
- Gardiner, Alan H. (1961). Egypt of the Pharaohs: An Introduction. London: Clarendon Press.
- Grimal, Nicolas (1992). A History of Ancient Egypt. Translated by Ian Shaw. Oxford: Blackwell Publishing. ISBN 978-0-631-19396-8.
- Hart, George (2005). The Routledge Dictionary of Egyptian Gods and Goddesses (2nd ed.). London: Routledge. ISBN 0-415-34495-6.
- Iwaszczuk, Jadwiga (2016). Sacred Landscape of Thebes during the Reign of Hatshepsut: Royal Construction Projects. Vol. 1. Warsaw: Instytut Kultur Śródziemnomorskich i Orientalnych Polskiej Akademii Nauk. ISBN 978-83-948004-2-0.
- Karkowski, Janusz (2016). "'A Temple Comes to Being' : A Few Comments on the Temple Foundation Ritual". Études et Travaux. 29. Instytut Kultur Śródziemnomorskich i Orientalnych: 111–123. ISSN 2449-9579.
- Kasprzycka, Katarzyna (2019). Zych, Iwona (ed.). "Reconstruction of the bases of sandstone sphinxes from the Temple of Queen Hatshepsut at Deir el-Bahari". Polish Archaeology in the Mediterranean. 28 (2): 359–387. doi:10.31338/uw.2083-537X.pam28.2.20. ISSN 2083-537X.
- Leprohon, Ronald J. (2013). The Great Name: Ancient Egyptian Royal Titulary. Writings from the ancient world. Vol. 33. Atlanta: Society of Biblical Literature. ISBN 978-1-58983-736-2.
- Muller, Maya (2002). "Afterlife". In Redford, Donald B. (ed.). The Ancient Gods Speak: A Guide to Egyptian Religion. Oxford: Oxford University Press. pp. 1–7. ISBN 0-19-515401-0.
- Pawlicki, Franciszek (2007). "History of PCMA research in Egypt". Polish Centre of Mediterranean Archaeology, University of Warsaw.
- Pawlicki, Franciszek (2017). The Main Sanctuary of Amun-Re in the Temple of Hatshepsut at Deir el-Bahari (PDF). Warsaw: Polish Center of Mediterranean Archaeology, University of Warsaw. ISBN 978-83-94288-7-3-0.
- Pirelli, Rosanna (1999). "Deir el-Bahri, Hatshepsut temple". In Bard, Kathryn (ed.). Encyclopedia of the archaeology of ancient Egypt. London; New York: Routledge. pp. 275–280. ISBN 978-0-203-98283-9.
- Redford, Donald B., ed. (2001). "Egyptian King List". The Oxford Encyclopedia of Ancient Egypt, Volume 3. Oxford: Oxford University Press. pp. 621–622. ISBN 978-0-19-510234-5.
- Robins, Gay (1993). Women in Ancient Egypt. Cambridge, MA: Harvard University Press. ISBN 0-674-95469-6.
- Roehrig, Catharine (2005a). "Foundation Deposits for the Temple of Hatshepsut at Deir el-Bahri". In Roehrig, Catharine (ed.). Hatshepsut From Queen to Pharaoh. New York: Metropolitan Museum of Art. pp. 141–146. ISBN 1-58839-173-6.
- Roehrig, Catharine (2005b). "The Two Tombs of Hatshepsut". In Roehrig, Catharine (ed.). Hatshepsut From Queen to Pharaoh. New York: Metropolitan Museum of Art. pp. 184–189. ISBN 1-58839-173-6.
- Roehrig, Catharine H.; Dreyfus, Renée; Keller, Cathleen A. (2005). "Introduction". In Roehrig, Catharine (ed.). Hatshepsut From Queen to Pharaoh. New York: Metropolitan Museum of Art. pp. 3–7. ISBN 1-58839-173-6.
- Roth, Ann Macy (2005). "Hatshepsut's Mortuary Temple at Deir el-Bahri: Architecture as Political Statement". In Roehrig, Catharine (ed.). Hatshepsut From Queen to Pharaoh. New York: Metropolitan Museum of Art. pp. 147–157. ISBN 1-58839-173-6.
- Roth, Ann Macy (2005b). "Erasing a reign". In Roehrig, Catharine (ed.). Hatshepsut From Queen to Pharaoh. New York: Metropolitan Museum of Art. pp. 277–283. ISBN 1-58839-173-6.
- Schlögel, Hermann (2001). "Aten". In Redford, Donald B. (ed.). The Oxford Encyclopedia of Ancient Egypt, Volume 1. Oxford: Oxford University Press. pp. 156–158. ISBN 978-0-19-510234-5.
- Shaw, Ian, ed. (2003). The Oxford History of Ancient Egypt. Oxford: Oxford University Press. ISBN 978-0-19-815034-3.
- Strudwick, Nigel; Strudwick, Helen (1999). Thebes in Egypt: A Guide to the Tombs and Temples of Ancient Luxor (1st. publ. ed.). Ithaca, NY: Cornell University Press. ISBN 0-8014-3693-1.
- Szafrański, Zbigniew E. (2007). "Deir el-Bahari: Temple of Hatshepsut". In Laskowska-Kusztal, Ewa (ed.). Seventy Years of Polish Archaeology in Egypt (PDF). Warsaw: Polish Center of Mediterranean Archaeology, University of Warsaw. ISBN 978-83-903796-1-6.
- Szafrański, Zbigniew E. (2014). "The Exceptional Creativity of Hatshepsut". In Galán, José M.; Bryan M., Betsy; Dorman, Peter F. (eds.). Creativity and Innovation in the Reign of Hatshepsut. Chicago, IL: Oriental Institute of the University of Chicago. ISBN 978-1-61491-024-4.
- Szafrański, Zbigniew E. (2018). Zych, Iwona (ed.). "Remarks on royal statues in the form of the god Osiris from Deir el-Bahari". Polish Archaeology in the Mediterranean. 27 (2): 375–390. doi:10.5604/01.3001.0013.3309. ISSN 2083-537X. S2CID 202510175.
- Szymczak, Agnieszka (April 10, 2019). "Deir el-Bahari, Temple of Hatshepsut". Polish Centre of Mediterranean Archaeology, University of Warsaw.
- Teeter, Emily (2001). "Divine Cults". In Redford, Donald B. (ed.). The Oxford Encyclopedia of Ancient Egypt, Volume 1. Oxford: Oxford University Press. pp. 340–345. ISBN 978-0-19-510234-5.
- Thompson, Stephen E. (2002). "Cults: An Overview". In Redford, Donald B. (ed.). The Ancient Gods Speak: A Guide to Egyptian Religion. Oxford: Oxford University Press. pp. 62–71. ISBN 0-19-515401-0.
- Troy, Lana (2001). "Eighteenth Dynasty to the Amarna Period". In Redford, Donald B. (ed.). The Oxford Encyclopedia of Ancient Egypt, Volume 2. Oxford: Oxford University Press. pp. 525–531. ISBN 978-0-19-510234-5.
- van Dijk, Jacobus (2003). "The Armana Period and the Later New Kingdom (c.1352–1069 BC)". In Shaw, Ian (ed.). The Oxford History of Ancient Egypt. Oxford: Oxford University Press. pp. 265–307. ISBN 978-0-19-815034-3.
- Verner, Miroslav (2001). The Pyramids: The Mystery, Culture and Science of Egypt's Great Monuments. New York: Grove Press. ISBN 978-0-8021-1703-8.
- Wilkinson, Richard H. (2000). The Complete Temples of Ancient Egypt. New York: Thames & Hudson. ISBN 978-0-500-05100-9.
- Yurco, Frank J. (1999). "representational evidence, New Kingdom temples". In Bard, Kathryn (ed.). Encyclopedia of the archaeology of ancient Egypt. London; New York: Routledge. pp. 818–821. ISBN 978-0-203-98283-9.
