= Dokki =

Dokki الدقى
- District
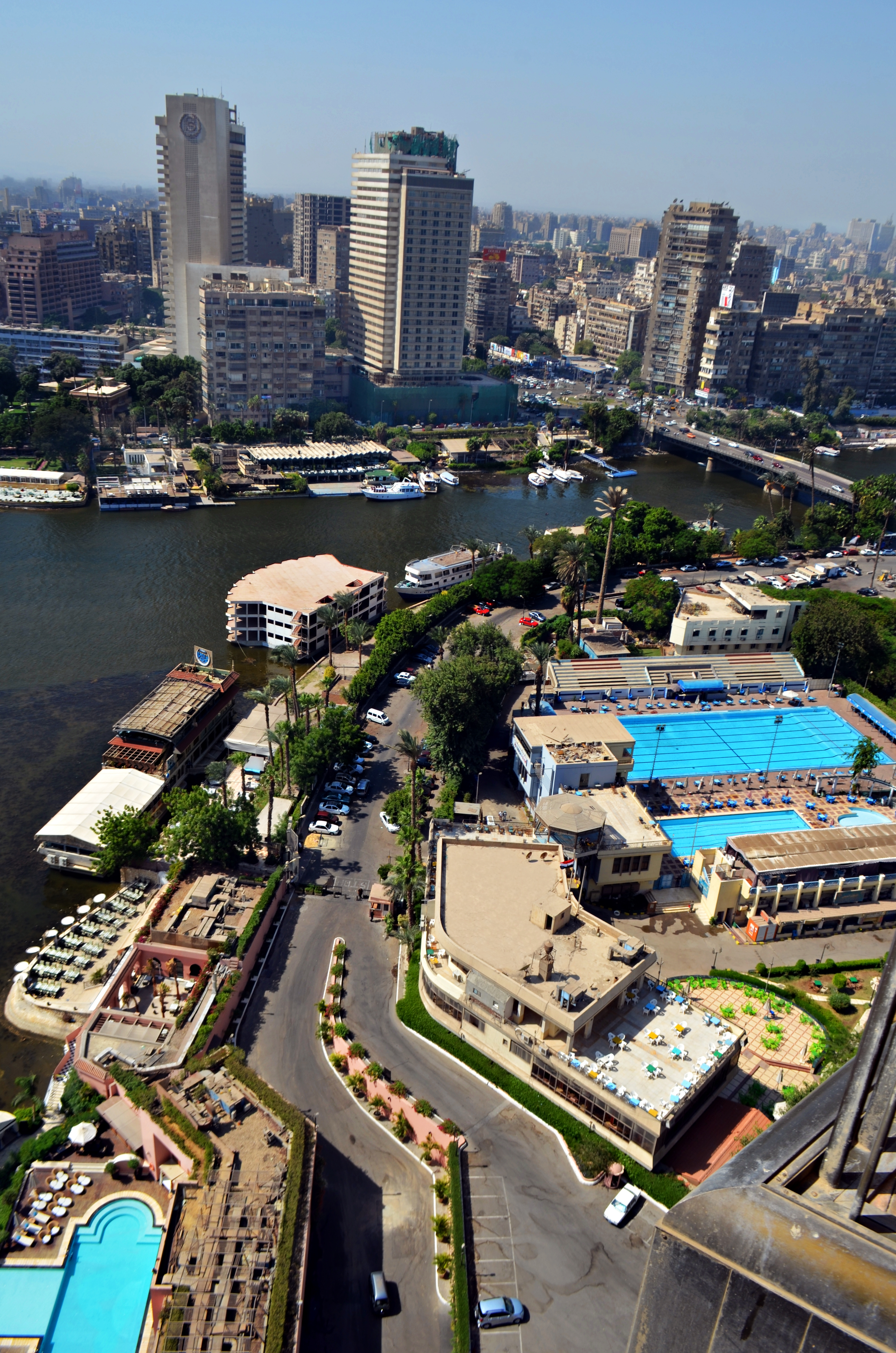
- El-Dokki neighborhood, seen from Zamalek

- Location in Egypt
- Coordinates: 30°02′17″N 31°12′40″E
- Country: Egypt
- Governorate: Giza Governorate
- Time zone: UTC+2 (EST)

Dokki (Egyptian Arabic: الدقى pronounced [ed.ˈdoʔ.ʔi]) is one of nine districts that make up Giza, Egypt. Dokki is situated on the western bank of the Nile, directly across from Downtown Cairo. It is a major residential and commercial district with major roads connecting the two parts of Greater Cairo.

== History ==
Dokki used to be a village on a mostly royal and state-owned agricultural estate held under waqf (endowment) until the early 20th century along with 'izbas (hamlets) such as Awlad 'Allam, Bein al-Sarayat and Dayr al-Nahya, surrounding the palace of princess Fatima, granddaughter of Khedieve Ismail. A renewed and expanded bridge and a real estate boom saw the land on Cairo's western bank being sold to property developers and subdivided into new suburban villa neighbourhoods. One of these companies was Société Anonyme Immobiliere des Terrains de Giza & Rodah which acquired the land around what is today Midan Finney, and after initial bankruptcy in 1910, started developing the land under new owner, Oswald Finney, in the 1930s. The Ministry of Awqaf was responsible for much of the urban sub-divisions in its northern part when its chief architect Mahmoud Riad planned Madinat al-Awqaf in 1948.

These developments and hamlets made up most of the Wasat (middle) district in the city of Giza, before being divided in 1997 into the districts of Dokki (developments, hamlets and southern half of Madinat al-Awqaf, reflected in the names of the sub-districts, see Demographics below), and Agouza to the north with the northern half of Madinat al-Awqaf known colloquially today as Mohandessin.

One theory suggests the name originated from the Dokki family, which inhabited this region since ancient times and came to it from Upper Egypt and resided in it, then soon moved to the countryside in Menoufia.

Many Cairene landmarks are located in Dokki, the German school Deutsche Evangelische Oberschule Kairo (DEO) and the embassies of many countries including Russia, Somalia, France, Chad, the Czech Republic, Pakistan, and Ethiopia. Dokki is home to approximately 56 foreign embassies, a number surpassed only by the Zamalek district. King Idris of Libya died at the Palace in Dokki in 1983.

== Demographics and sub-districts ==
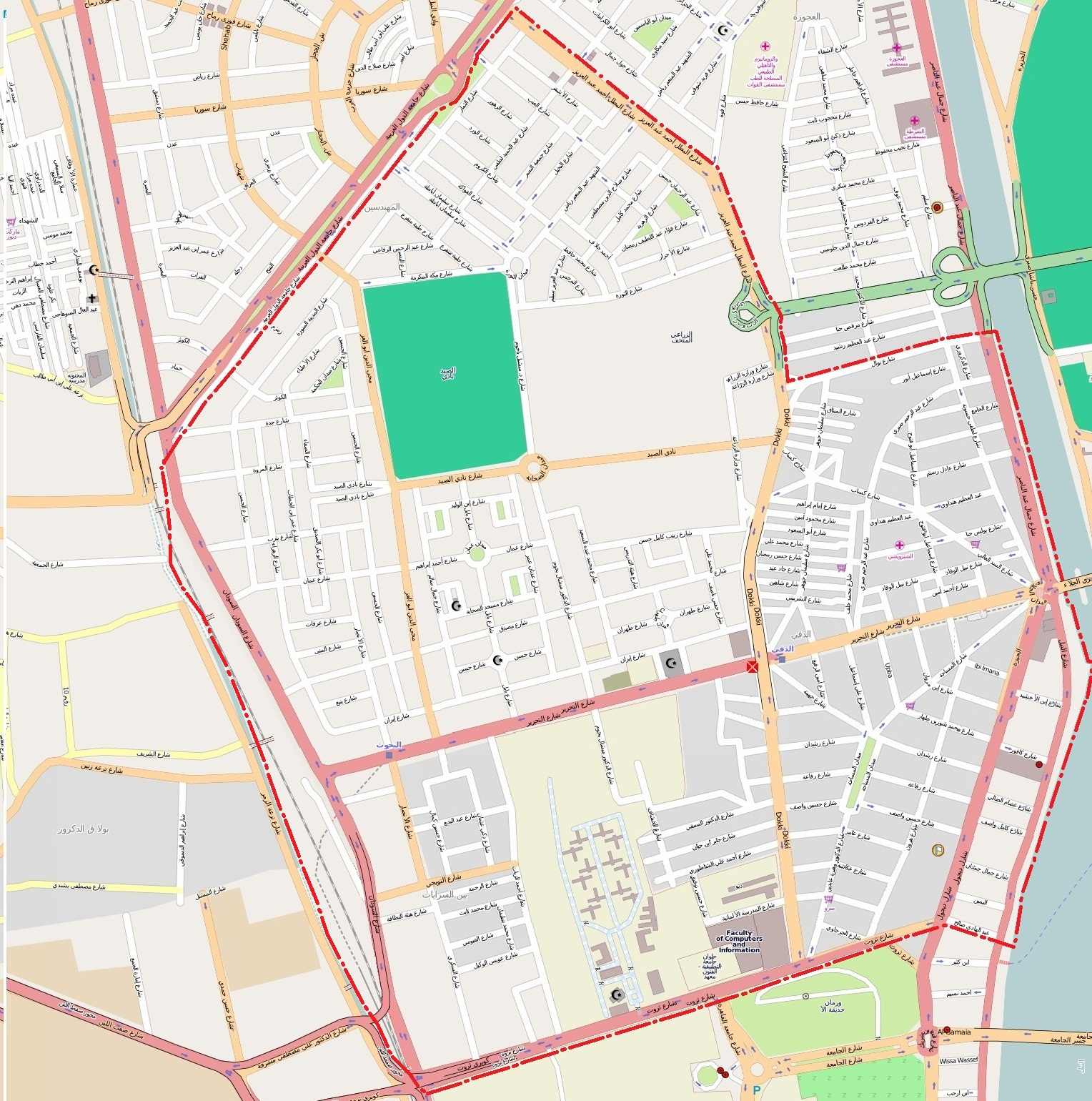
Dokki borders

In 2017, Dokki had a population of 70,926 people (35,750 male, 35,176 female).

It is sub-divided into six shiakhas as follows:

2017 Dokki district population by shiakha
Shiakha	Code 2017	Total Population	Male	Female
Sulaymân Jûhar	210301	14661	7389	7272
Madînat al-Awqâf	210302	27567	13677	13890
Dâyir al-Nâhya	210303	6614	3356	3258
Awlâd `Allâm	210304	2284	1134	1150
Bayn al-Sarâyât	210305	9459	4919	4540
Urmân, al-	210306	10341	5275	5066

== Education ==
The Dokki neighborhood is also called the "Schools District", where there are about 102 schools that represent all types of schools (government - private - experimental - languages). In addition to that, there is also [Deutsche Evangelische Oberschule]

- The Deutsche Evangelische Oberschule is located in Dokki.
- The Pakistan International School of Cairo was formerly in Dokki.

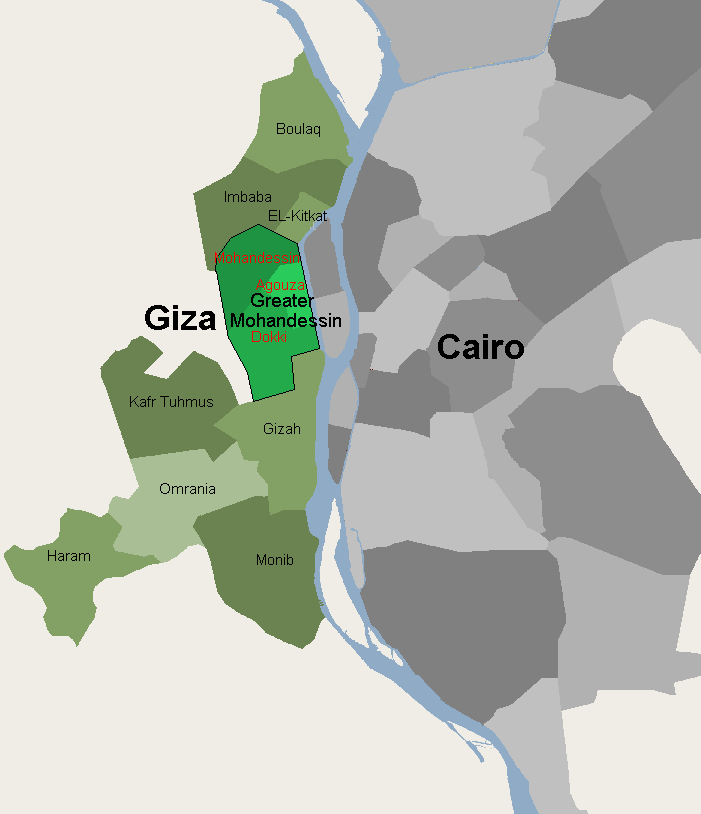
Map of Dokki and Greater Mohandessin in Giza

== Transport ==
The Dokki district currently has 2 Cairo Metro stations (Bohooth & Dokki) both are parts of line 2. In addition to that 1 station from the under development line 3 will be on the Gameat Al Dewal Al Arabeya street between Dokki and Mohandiseen district Many public buses lines pass through it and it has a lot of station and on of the main working district for.

== Business ==
=== Banks ===
Almost all banks in Egypt have one or more branches in the Dokki district. For example El Ahli bank has around 5 branches in the Dokki.

=== Legal ===
- Ibrachy & Dermarkar (1932)

Dokki contains a high concentration of companies, schools, embassies and banks.

== See also ==
- Mohandessin
