= Agouza =

District of Giza city, Egypt

Coordinates: 30°03′08″N 31°12′56″E

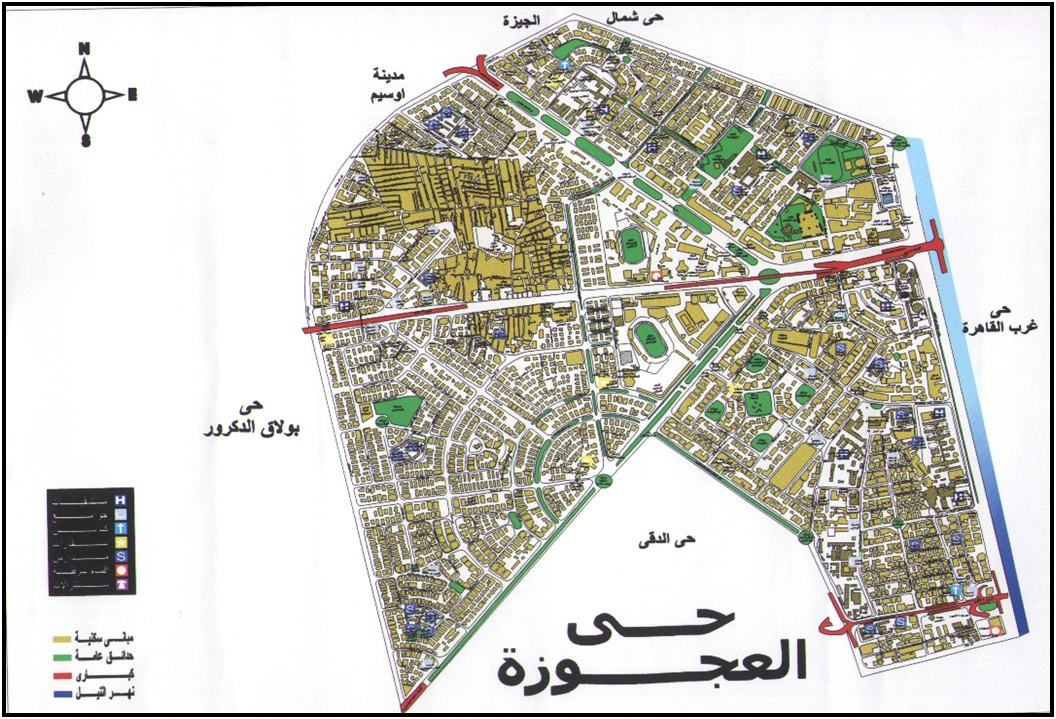
Agouza district map

Agouza (Arabic: العجوزة, romanized: al-ʿAjūza) is one of nine municipal districts that form Giza city, which is part of the Greater Cairo metropolis, on the western bank of the river Nile. It is situated between 6th October Bridge and 15 May Bridge and south of Imbaba. Most of it is colloquially known as Mohandessin, a 1950s planned community originally called Madinat al-Awqaf, subdivided into a number of profession-based housing cooperatives, one of which was for engineers (مهندسين, muhandisīn).

The Egyptian National Circus and the adjoining Balloon Theater are on the Agouza Corniche. The British Council main centre in Egypt is also on the Corniche.

== History ==
Agouza used to be a mostly royal and state-owned agricultural estate held under waqf (endowment) until the early 20th Century with villages, such as Mit Okba, and 'izbas (hamlets) such as al-Hutiyya. From the 1930s the Ministry of Awqaf piloted plans to turn the estates into a new suburban district of Cairo as Dokki to its south flourished. In 1948, its chief architect Mahmoud Riad set out the final plan of Madinat al-Awqaf, with plots being advertised for sale that year.

Much of this development along with smaller developments to its south made up the Wasat (middle) district in the city of Giza, before being divided in 1997 into the districts of Agouza (most of which is Madinat al-Awqaf/Mohandessin) and Dokki, (the other half of Madinat al-Aqaf plus other developments) with most of Agouza known colloquially as Mohandeseen, even though it is a smaller non-administrative shiakha (census block) within it (see Demographics below).

=== Origin of the name ===
There are two contesting stories explaining the origin of Agouza's name.

The first is that in the 1940s and 1950s, an old woman (ʿajūza in Arabic) sat alongside the Corniche and sold coffee to cars passing by. When people wanted to meet up, they would say "I'm at the agouza," and the name just stuck. The story is unverified however.

The second, perhaps more likely story, is that the name refers to Nazly Hanem, the wife of Sherif Pacha who was Prime Minister at the time of Mohamed Ali in the 1800s. At the age of 80 she decided to build a mosque to fulfill her husband's wish after his death. Given her old age people referred to the mosque as Al Agouza which later became the name of the whole district.

=== Nawal Street ===
After Abdel Rahim Sabri Pasha's daughter Nawal died at the age of 6, he named his palace (now the Military Nasr Academy) after her, which led to its street being named Nawal Street.

== Demographics and sub-districts ==
The district of Agouza had a population of 278,479 in 2017, 143,681 male and 134,798 female. It is made of six shiakhas:

2017 Population of the Agouza District by shiakha
Shiakha	Code 2017 Census	Total Population	Male	Female
Ḥûtiyya, al-	210201	15,585	7939	7646
`Ajûza, al- (Agouza)	210202	12,473	6514	5959
Mît `Uqba (Mit Okba)	210203	68,393	34,590	33,803
A`lâm, al- (Madînat al-Awqâf)	210204	18,286	9314	8972
Muhandisîn, al- (Jazîrat Mît `Uqba)	210205	21,141	10,966	10,175
Arḍ al-Liwâ'	210206	142,601	74,358	68,243

== Notable places ==
=== Hospitals ===
- Al-Agouza Hospital

=== Libraries ===
- 6 October Public Library
