= International Simón Bolívar Prize =

- Sponsored by: Government of Venezuela
- Date: 1983
- Presented by: UNESCO
- Reward: US$ 25,000
- Status: defunct
- Website: Official website

The International Simón Bolívar Prize was conferred to recognise activities of outstanding merit that, in accordance with the ideals of Latin American independence hero Simón Bolívar, "contribute to the freedom, independence and dignity of peoples and to the strengthening of a new international economic, social and cultural order".

The Prize was awarded by the United Nations Educational, Scientific and Cultural Organization (UNESCO) every second year, on 24 July (the anniversary of Bolívar's birth). In addition to the intrinsic distinction bestowed on recipients, the award came with a sum of money (currently US$25,000), determined and donated by the government of Venezuela.

Prize winners were selected by the unanimous decision a jury of seven "eminent persons" – five representing the regions of the world, one chosen by the Venezuelan authorities, and a representative of the director-general – from a list of candidates submitted by UNESCO member states and associate members. Both individuals and institutions were eligible as candidates.

The last award was given in 2004, having been suspended by UNESCO. It was subject to revisement, but nothing ever came.

== Laureates ==
The following persons and organisations have been recognised by the International Simón Bolívar Prize since its founding in 1983:

Year	Recipient	Country
1983	Juan Carlos I of Spain; Nelson Mandela	Spain; South Africa
1985	Contadora Group	Colombia Mexico Panama Venezuela
1988	Vicariate of Solidarity	Chile
1990	Václav Havel	Czechoslovakia
1992	Aung San Suu Kyi; Julius Nyerere	Burma; Tanzania
1996	Muhammad Yunus	Bangladesh
1998	Mário Soares; Milad Hanna	Portugal; Egypt
2000	Samuel Ruiz García; Julio Sanguinetti	Mexico; Uruguay
2004	Nadia Al-Jurdi Nouaihed; Casa de las Américas	Lebanon; Cuba
