= Khereduankh =

Goddess credited as the mother of Imhotep

Genealogy
- Parents: Banebdjedet
- Children: Imhotep, Renpetneferet (sometimes)

Khereduankh (also spelled Kheredu-ankh) is a goddess who is credited as being the mother of Imhotep in Late Period and Ptolemaic Period Ancient Egyptian texts. There are no texts from the Old Kingdom that mention any woman named Khereduankh so it is likely she was fictional.

== Mythology ==
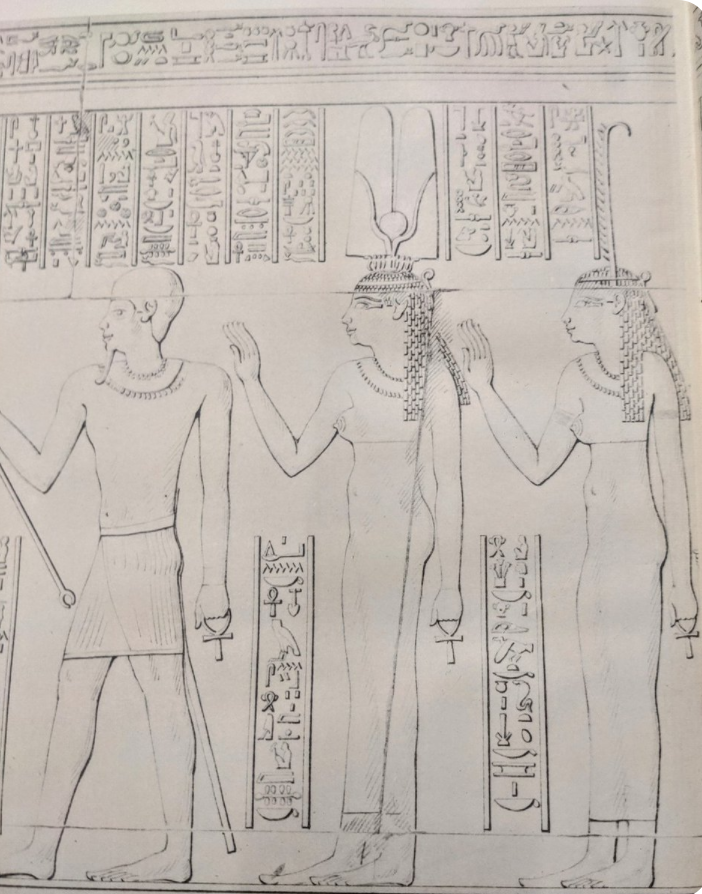
Reproduction of a relief of Imhotep, Khereduankh and Renpetneferet in the chapel of Deir el-Bahari.

As Imhotep, along with Amenhotep, son of Hapu, was assimilated to Thoth during the Late Period, his mother was also given divine status along with Renpetneferet, who was either Imhotep's sister or wife. This is not an entirely unique event in Egyptian history. As Amenhotep son of Hapu's mother was also deified though his sister/wife was not. Khereduankh was also said to be the daughter of Banebdjedet. A demotic papyrus from the temple of Tebtunis, dating to the 2nd century AD, preserves a long story about Imhotep. Which mentions Khereduankh along with the rest of Imhotep's family.

== See also ==
- Imhotep
- Renpetneferet
