= List of Egyptian architects =

This is a list of architects, urban planners, engineers, overseers and officials that were either born in Egypt, or lived and worked there for a significant part of their career and who had a notable impact on buildings and towns there.

== Ancient Egyptian overseers ==
- Imhotep (3rd dynasty)
- Hemiunu (4th dynasty)
- Senenmut (18th dynasty)
- Amenhotep, son of Hapu (18th dynasty)

== 19th-century planners and engineers ==
During the 19th century, planning and construction of villages and infrastructure was undertaken by archaeologists and engineers, especially those who headed the public works departments.

- Pascal Coste (1787–1879)
- Joseph Hekekyan (1807–1875)
- Linant Pasha (1799–1883)
- Ali Mubarak (1823–1893)

== Pioneer architects ==
A term coined by historians and peers for architects in Egypt that were very influential in the shaping of the profession, especially initiating a home-grown blend of Egyptian Modernist architecture, roughly during the second quarter of the 20th century.

- Ali Labib Gabr (1898–1966)
- Mahmoud Riad (1905–1977)
- Mohamed Kamal Ismail (1908–2008)
- Naoum Shebib (1915–1985)
- Sayed Karim (1911–2005)
- Charles Ayrout (1905–1961)

== Neo-vernacularists ==
Architects that sought significant inspiration in their work, whether from local vernacular architecture.

- Ramses Wissa Wassef (1911–1974)
- Hassan Fathy (1900–1989)
- Abdel-Wahed El-Wakil (born 1943)

== Pioneer and contemporary civil engineers ==
- Michel Bakhoum (1913–1981)
- Milad Hanna (1924–2012)
- Hani Azer (born 1948)

== See also ==
- List of architects
- List of Egyptians
