= Mohandiseen =

Mohandessin المهندسين
- Planned community
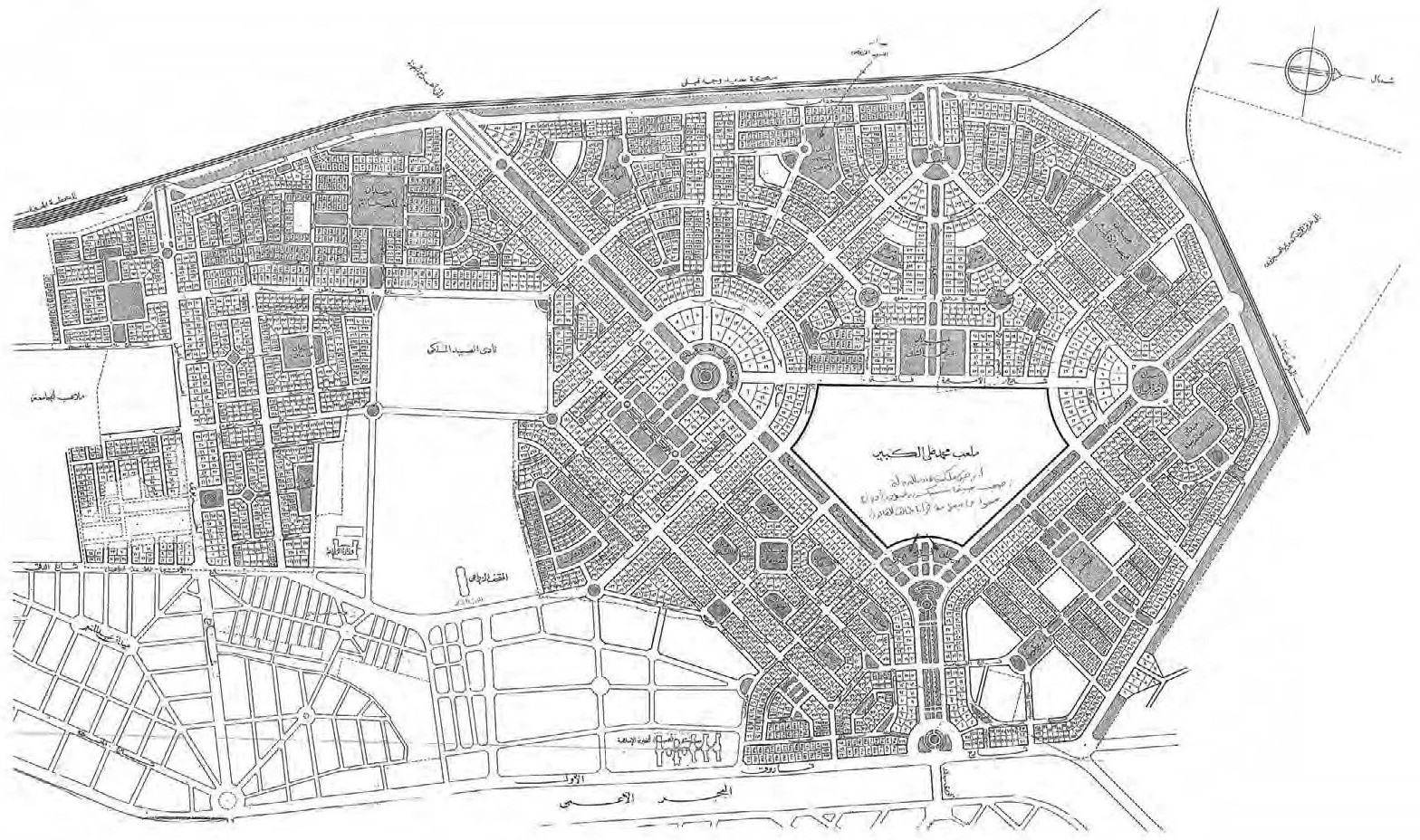
- Original master plan of Mohandessin in 1948, then known as Madinat al-Awqaf

- Location in Egypt
- Coordinates: 30°03′11″N 31°12′07″E
- Country: Egypt
- Governorate: Giza Governorate
- Time zone: UTC+2 (EST)

Mohandiseen (Egyptian Arabic: المهندسين, romanized: Al-Mohandisīn, lit. 'The Engineers', pronounced [almohændɪˈsiːn]) is a major 1940s sub-division project originally named Madinat al-Awqaf, and made up most of the Wasat (middle) district in the city of Giza, before being divided in 1997 into the districts of Agouza (covers most of the district) and Dokki (Covers half of the district). Al-Mohandessin in Arabic literally means the engineers, after one of the sub-districts that was sold to the Engineers' Syndicate cooperative, and becoming the colloquial name for most of the Agouza side.

== History ==
Mohandessin used to be a mostly royal and state-owned agricultural estate held under waqf (endowment) until the early 20th Century with villages, such as Mit Okba, and 'izbas (hamlets) such as al-Hutiyya, and 'Awlad Allam. From the 1930s the Ministry of Awqaf, that owned the land, had piloted plans to turn the estates into a new suburban district of Cairo as Dokki to its south flourished. In 1948, its chief architect Mahmoud Riad set out the final plan of Madinat al-Awqaf, with plots being advertised for sale that year. The new district was subdivided into a number of large plots sold at subsidised prices - after the July 1952 Revolution - to twenty housing cooperatives representing professional syndicates with over two thousand members, including those set up for the military, navy, police, judges, medical doctors (Aṭibbā’), radio and television (Madinat al-'ilam), journalists (Ṣaḥafiyyīn), teachers (Mu‘allimīn), and engineers (Madinat al-Mohandessin). Large land plots of 500 to 1,000 square meters were sold after a 30 percent discount, which the Awqaf bore, at LE 2–3 per square meter, paid off over fifteen years without interest, while members of the cooperatives were able to access soft loans to build at 3 percent interest.

== Today ==
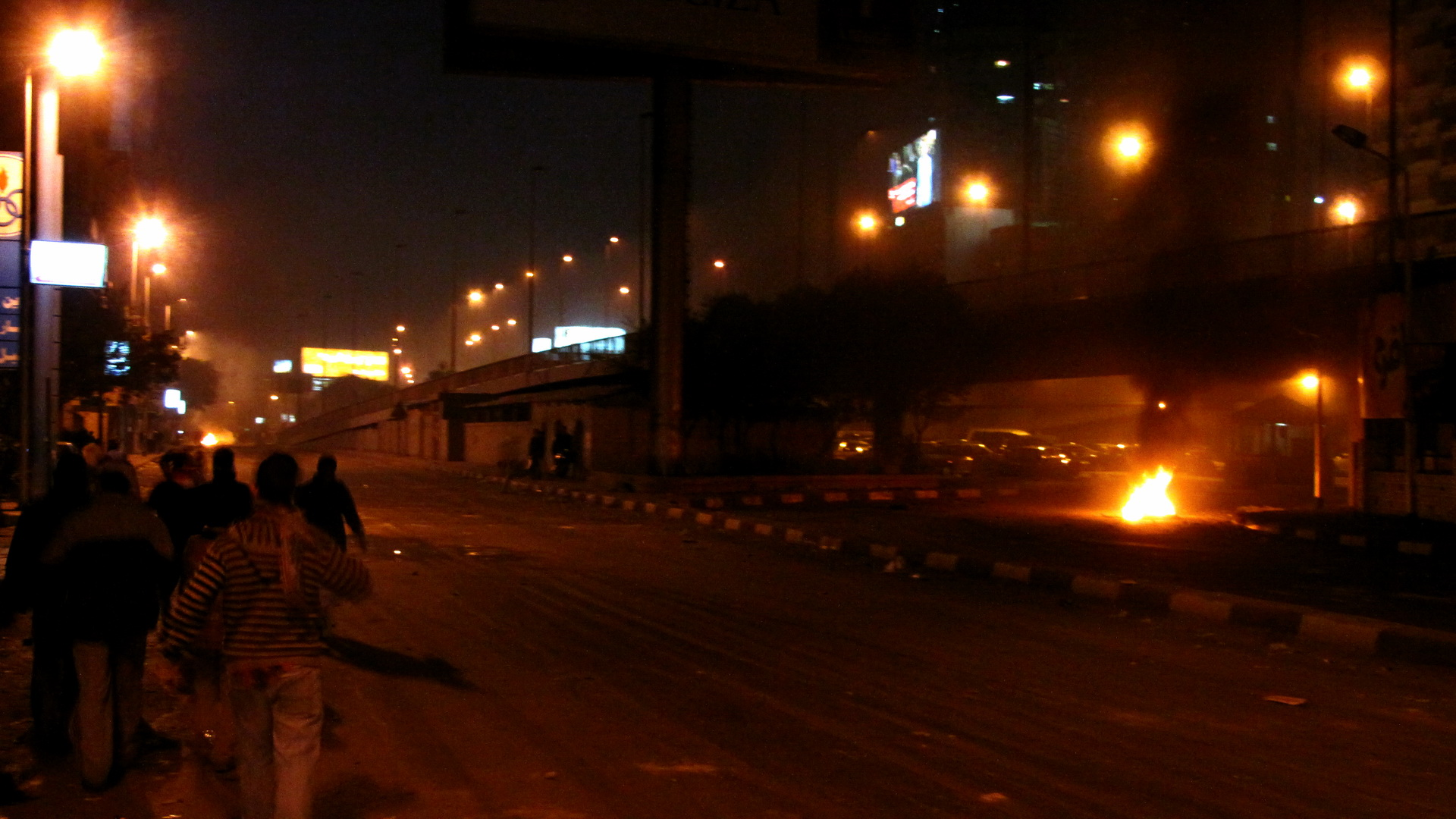
The up-scale Mohandeseen district in Giza during the Friday of Anger. Violent clashes occurred here between the protesters and the security forces which occupied the bridge on the left, involving stone-throwing, Molotov cocktails, rubber bullets and tear gas grenades.

Today we know the area simply as Mohandiseen based on the Engineers’ City cooperative housing sub-district planned and built by leading architects of the time, while administratively it forms most of the Agouza and part of the Dokki, districts.

A major street that is intersecting the neighborhood called Gam'et el Duwal el Arabya (Arab League Blvd.). The main shopping area in Mohandiseen is called Sour Nadi el Zamalik, which is a magnetic location for Arab Tourists that visit Cairo in the summer and on vacations. Also a new state of the art mall in Shehab street was constructed and currently operating, it is called Platinum Mall. Several sporting clubs are also to found there, including Tersana, El Zamalek, and The Shooting Club (or The Hunting Club, Nadi 'L Seid).

There are also over 20 hospitals in the neighborhood with the main one being Al Salam hospital on the main road.

Mohandiseen, is considered to be one of the most prestigious and expensive areas in Greater Giza.

== Economy ==
The head office of Ezz Steel is in Mohandiseen.

== Lifestyle ==
Although Mohandessin does not have as many monuments and historical buildings as other districts in Giza, it enjoys being a leading district in shops, restaurants and cafés. Most international franchises, which opened in Egypt, with over 200 stores operating 18 hours a day. There are several cinemas in Mohandiseen catering to the district's population.

The Arab League Boulevard, located in central Mohandessin is considered Giza's notable red-light district along with Haram avenue, both are considered main attractions for tourists.

Mohandessin is home to many foreign embassies in Egypt.

Since 2014, Mohandessin also hosts Cairo Contemporary Dance Center, an independent space for contemporary dance in Egypt, hosting the first Contemporary Dance school in Africa and the Arab world.

When it comes to Religion & Spirituality, Mohandessin hosts a diverse population which required several Mosques and Churches, yet the majority of the residents adopt Islam, with several important mosques located there, such as Chazliya Mosque, and Mostafa Mahmoud Mosque, as well as Tarik Ibn-Al Walid Mosque.

Yet in Major Celebrations, the rich residents of Mohandesin tend to pray in the Shooting Club Mosque, while the surrounding poorer areas of Mohandesin, pray in the Larger Mostafa Mahmoud Mosque.

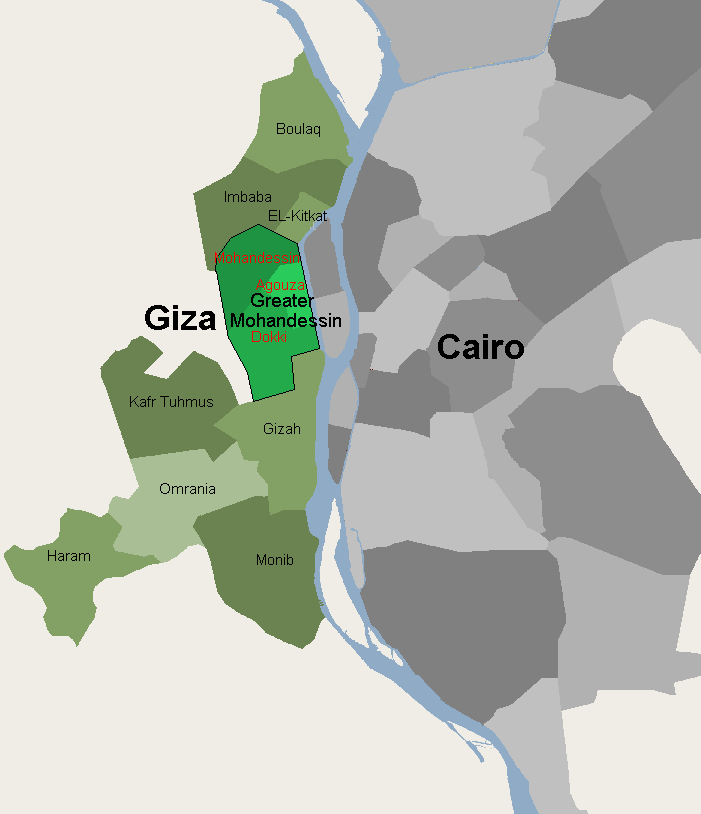
Map of Mohandiseen and Greater Mohandessin in Giza

== Embassies ==
There are a number of embassies in Mohandiseen:

- Burundi
- Cameroon
- Central African Republic
- Equatorial Guinea
- Eritrea
- Qatar

== Notable people ==
Notable people that were born or lived there:

- Amr Moussa (born 1936), Former Secretary-General of the Arab League.
- Naguib Mahfouz (1911–2006), Nobel Prize in Literature Laureate.
- Adel Emam (born 1940), Prominent Arab actor.
- Atef Ebeid (born 1932), Former Egyptian Prime Minister.
- Ahmad Zaki (1949–2005), Prominent Egyptian actor.
- Amr Khalid (born 1967), Islamic Preacher, ranked 6th most influential intellectual in the world by Prospect magazine
- Bassem Youssef (born 1974), Television host
- Habib El Adly (1938–2011), The Former Minister of Interior.
- Hazem Salah Abu Ismail (born 1961), Prominent Islamist Politician, and Sheikh.
- Ali Salem (1936–2015), Playwright, author, and political commentator.
