= Renpetneferet =

Sister or wife of Imhotep

Genealogy
- Parents: Khereduankh
- Siblings: Imhotep (sometimes husband)
- Consort: Imhotep (sometimes brother)

Renpetneferet (Ancient Egyptian: rnpt-nfrt) is a minor goddess who is credited as being either the sister or the wife of Imhotep in Late Period Egyptian texts. There is no evidence of an individual by this name existing during the reign of King Djoser, although similar names were being used for women during the fourth dynasty.

== Imhotep's Divine Family ==
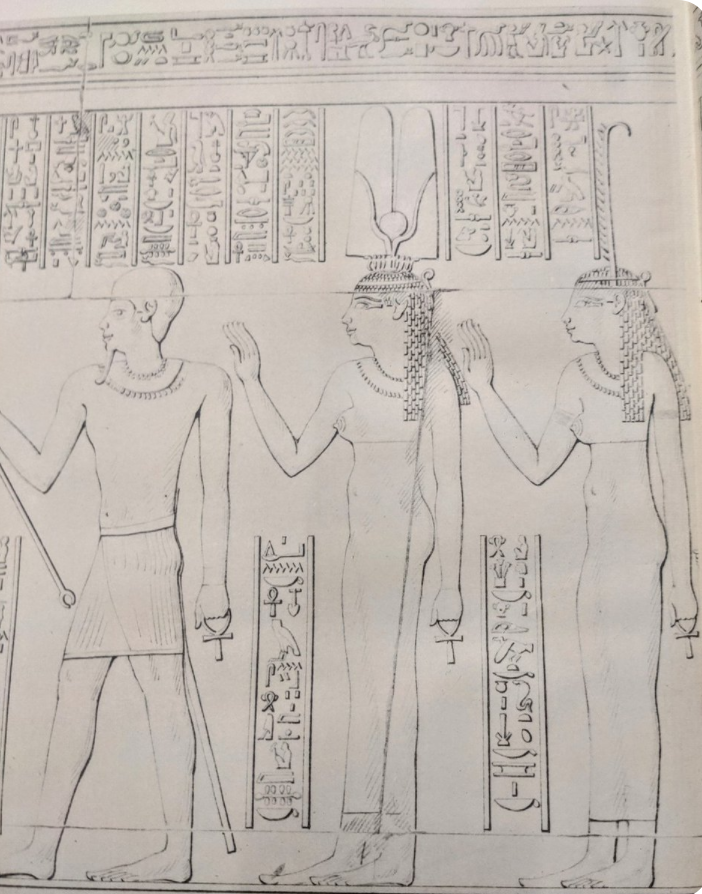
Reproduction of a relief of Imhotep, Khereduankh and Renpetneferet in the chapel of Deir el-Bahari.

The meaning of the name Renpetneferet is connected to the New Year, the adjective nefer lending connotations of youth and beauty. Renpet means year, and is often depicted as a minor goddess in her own right, connected with the God Heh from the Ogdoad in the iconography of the Shen Ring. This identification of the renpet with the Ogdoad and Heh is visible in the iconography associated with Seshat, the wife of Thoth. Seshat is depicted inscribing the count of the years into a renpet, or a palm frond which functioned as a register of time, and as the hieroglyph for the word year. This renpet emerges from a Shen Ring with a frog perched on top of it, the frog representing the Ogdoad.

As Imhotep, along with Amenhotep son of Hapu, was assimilated to Thoth during the Late Period, his wife and mother were also given divine status. This is a unique event in Egyptian history. Although Amenhotep son of Hapu's mother was deified, his wife/sister was not. This "most holy of families" was connected with the Hermopolitan reanalysis which occurred in the late period, and led to Thoth-Hermes. This is supported by the importance the Hermopolitan Cosmology had in the worship of Imhotep and Thoth during the Late Period.

In Deir el-Bahari a temple to Amenhotep son of Hapu and Imhotep was created during the Ptolemaic period, where Hygieia was worshipped alongside Asclepius, a possible Greek association with Renpetneferet.

== In Egyptian literature ==
A demotic papyrus from the temple of Tebtunis, dating to the 2nd century AD, preserves a long story about Imhotep. King Djoser plays a prominent role in the story, which also mentions Imhotep's family; His father the god Ptah, his mother Khereduankh, and his younger sister Renpetneferet. At one point Djoser desires Renpetneferet, and Imhotep disguises himself and tries to rescue her. The text also refers to the royal tomb of Djoser. Part of the legend includes an anachronistic battle between the Old Kingdom and the Assyrian armies where Imhotep fights an Assyria sorceress in a duel of magic.

== See also ==
- Imhotep
- Thoth
- Seshat
- Renpet
