= Ali Labib Gabr =

Egyptian architect

- Born: 2 February 1898; Cairo, Egypt
- Died: 19 January 1966 (aged 67); Cairo
- Citizenship: Egypt
- Education: University of Liverpool School of Architecture
- Occupation: Architect
- Years active: 1928-1963
- Spouse: Khayriyya Ahmad Abd al-Khaliq
- Awards: Medal of Sciences & Arts

Ali Labib Gabr (February 14, 1898-January 19, 1966) was an Egyptian architect and the first Egyptian Dean of the School of Architecture at Cairo University. He is noted for being a leading 'pioneer architect', one of a group of architects who moved away from the then-prevalent Beaux-Arts style and integrated modernism into Egyptian design. Gabr was not interested in creating forms in line with any "national style"; in designing commercial and institutional buildings, workers' housing, apartment buildings and luxury villas, he blended modern and classic French and British forms with nods to Levantine traditions. His main concern was always functionality, practical utility and long-term viability, and ensuring that designs addressed real-world needs.

== Early life and education ==
Ali Labib Gabr was born in Cairo, the youngest of two sons of Mohammed Refaat Gabr and his wife Saheer Hanem El Beida. He was educated at the Khedivial School, then at Cairo’s Polytechnical School, graduating from its Architectural Department in 1920. That same year, he was granted a government scholarship to complete his studies at University of Liverpool School of Architecture, where he was known as a talented draughtsman. For his these, Gabr submitted the working designs for a theatre; Sir Charles Herbert Reilly said that they were “the best set ever submitted to the school". Following his 1924 graduation, Gabr spent some time in London, working for Nicholas & Dixon-Spain, and then returned to Cairo.

== Career ==
Gabr returned to his former school, working as Assistant Lecturer at the Architectural Department of the Polytechnical School. He became a Lecturer in 1927, and a Professor in 1930. In 1934, he became the school's Dean and held that post until 1955. However, beginning in 1928, he had a busy private practice. His first villas, designed in the typical Italianate manner of the time, reveal an early involvement with ornamental Art Deco but he was a great admirer of Willem Marinus Dudok and his work soon moved toward the cubism and Neoplasticism of the Amsterdam School.

In 1946, Gabr was commissioned by the Misr Spinning and Weaving Company to design and execute a workers’ housing scheme, for the company's 26,000 workers. The first of its kind in Egypt, the development incorporated row houses, blocks of flats and up-to-date social, sporting, and recreational facilities. He would build two more developments for the company, as well as several office buildings and luxury hotels.

Gabr participated in international architectural networks, maintaining links with the Réunions Internationales d'Architectes (RIA), a group that rivaled the Congrès Internationaux d’Architecture Moderne (CIAM) and influenced the formation of the International Union of Architects (IUA).[1] Following his death on January 19, 1966, in Cairo, Gabr's work has received renewed scholarly attention, including a 2024 Graham Foundation grant awarded to Yasmine El Rashidi for a monograph titled Ali Labib Gabr and the Decolonization of Architecture, drawing on personal and archival research to examine his role in Egyptian modernism

In 1962, Gabr served on the technical committee established by UNESCO and the Egyptian Ministry of Culture for the Abu Simbel Salvage Operation, which aimed at rescuing the ancient monuments of Nubia from being submerged due by the new Aswan High Dam. For his work on this project, Gabr was awarded the Medal of Sciences & Arts in 1964.

== Personal life and death ==
Gabr was married with one child. He was an avid photographer and painter and, for many years, led the Cairo Art Society. He traveled widely and used his knowledge of international trends and ideas in his teaching. He died in Cairo in 1966. His Lawyers’ Syndicate Building remains Cairo's rallying point for political and social activism.

== Known works ==
- Muhammad Rida Bey Villa, Zamalek, 1932
- Muhammad Fathy Villa, Giza, 1932
- Umm Kulthum Villa, Zamalek, 1935
- Makram Ebeid Villa, Alexandria, 1936
- Misr Spinning and Weaving Company Workers' Housing Development, El Mahalla El Kubra, 1936
- Villa Erfan-Liscovitch, Maadi, 1937
- Ahmed Kamel Pasha Building, Cairo, 1938
- Embassy of Lebanon, Zamalek, 1939
- Ali Hussein Bey Ayoub House, Zamalek, 1940
- Abd Al-Hamid bey Attia Villa, Cairo, 1940
- Waqf Raafat Bey Block, Cairo, 1940
- Al-Shurbaji Factories, Imbaba, 1940
- Raafat Bey Building, Cairo, 1941
- Lawyers’ Syndicate Building, Cairo, 1948
- Misr Rayon Company Mills Workers' Housing Development, Kafr El Dawwar, 1950
- National Center for Scientific Research, 1950
- Misr Spinning and Weaving Company Plant and Workers' Housing Development, Helwan, 1951
- Mohammed Abdel Wahab Villa, Zamalek, 1951
- Ali Labib Gabr Building, Zamalek, 1951
- Government Press Building, Cairo, 1953
- National Research Centre Building, Cairo, 1956
- New Cataract Hotel, Aswan, 1961
- Winter Palace Hotel, Luxor, 1963
