= Mahmoud Riad (architect) =

Egyptian architect

Mahmoud Riad (also spelt Mahmud Ryad, Arabic: محمود رياض; 1905–1979) was an Egyptian architect, urban planner, and housing policy maker. Over a four decade career, Riad designed and built many iconic buildings in New York, Cairo, Alexandria and Kuwait, and is considered a "foundational figure in twentieth century Egyptian architecture," and one of the 'pioneer' Egyptian architects. He held government positions in architecture and planning departments, and founded the Egyptian government's first high office for housing, the Department of Popular Homes.

== Education and apprenticeship ==
Mahmoud Riad graduated from Cairo University’s architecture department in 1927 then went on to acquire a B.Arch degree from the University of Liverpool in 1931, where his student 5th year thesis design for a "Combined Bus and Railway Terminal Station for Alexandria (Egypt)" was seen to owe much to his Beaux Art training in Liverpool and little to his native Middle-Eastern traditions. Riad obtained his diploma in civic design from the same school in 1933.

During his apprenticeship in 1930, he worked with Shreve, Lamb and Harmon on their Manhattan masterpieces, the Empire State Building and 500 Fifth Avenue.

== Architect and urban designer ==
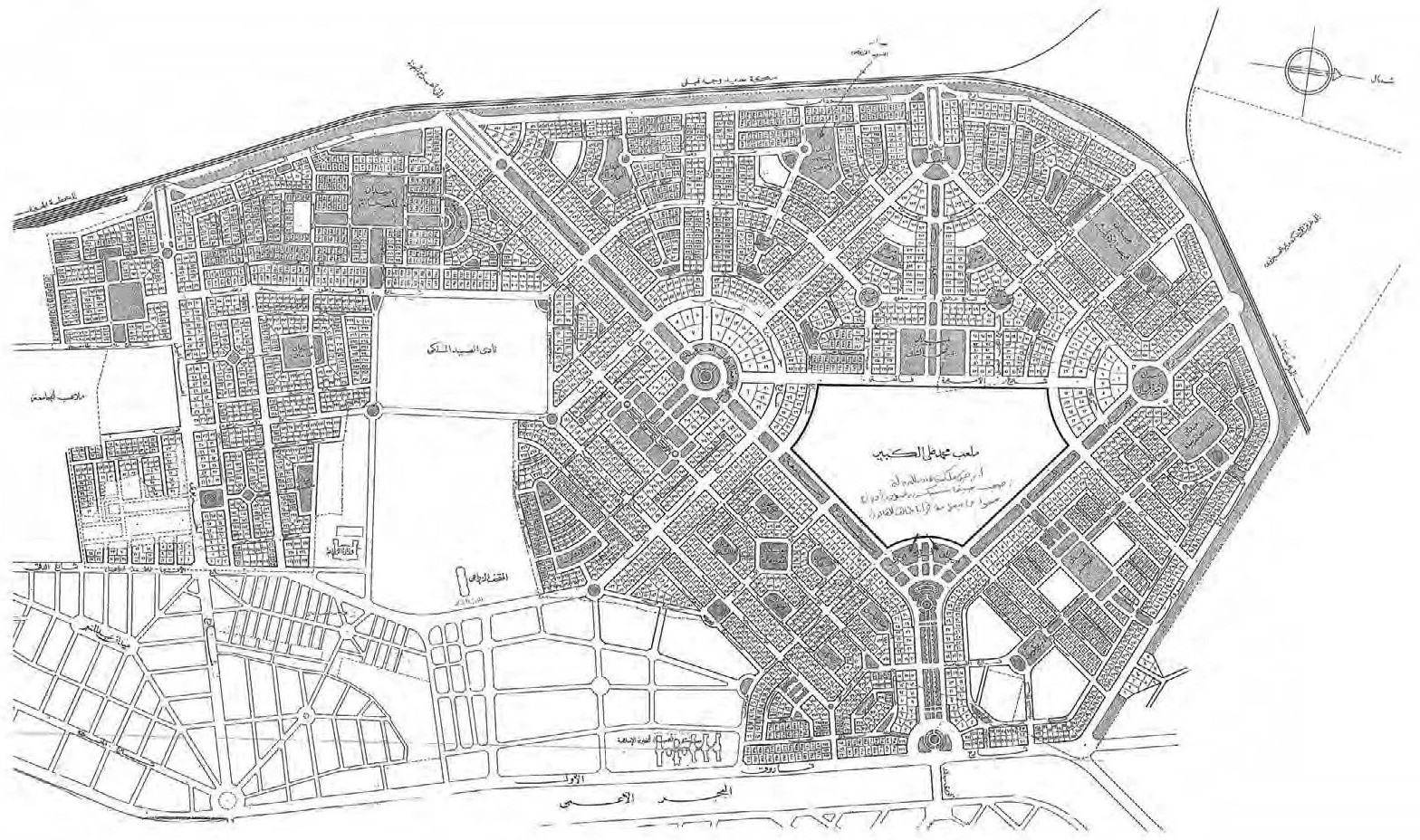
Madinat al-Awqaf (today Mohandessin) Masterplan, designed by Riad while head of the Ministry of Awqaf's architecture department in 1948.

Riad founded his practice, Riad Architects, in Cairo in 1934. However, he was almost immediately appointed to government positions as a designer and planner, blurring the lines between what he worked on as a private architect, and as a public one.

Riad became head of the Architecture and Engineering Department at the Ministry of Religious Endowments in 1939, where in 1948 he designed Madinat al-Awqaf on a large estate the ministry owned on Cairo's west bank in Giza. That neighbourhood is known today as Mohandessin.

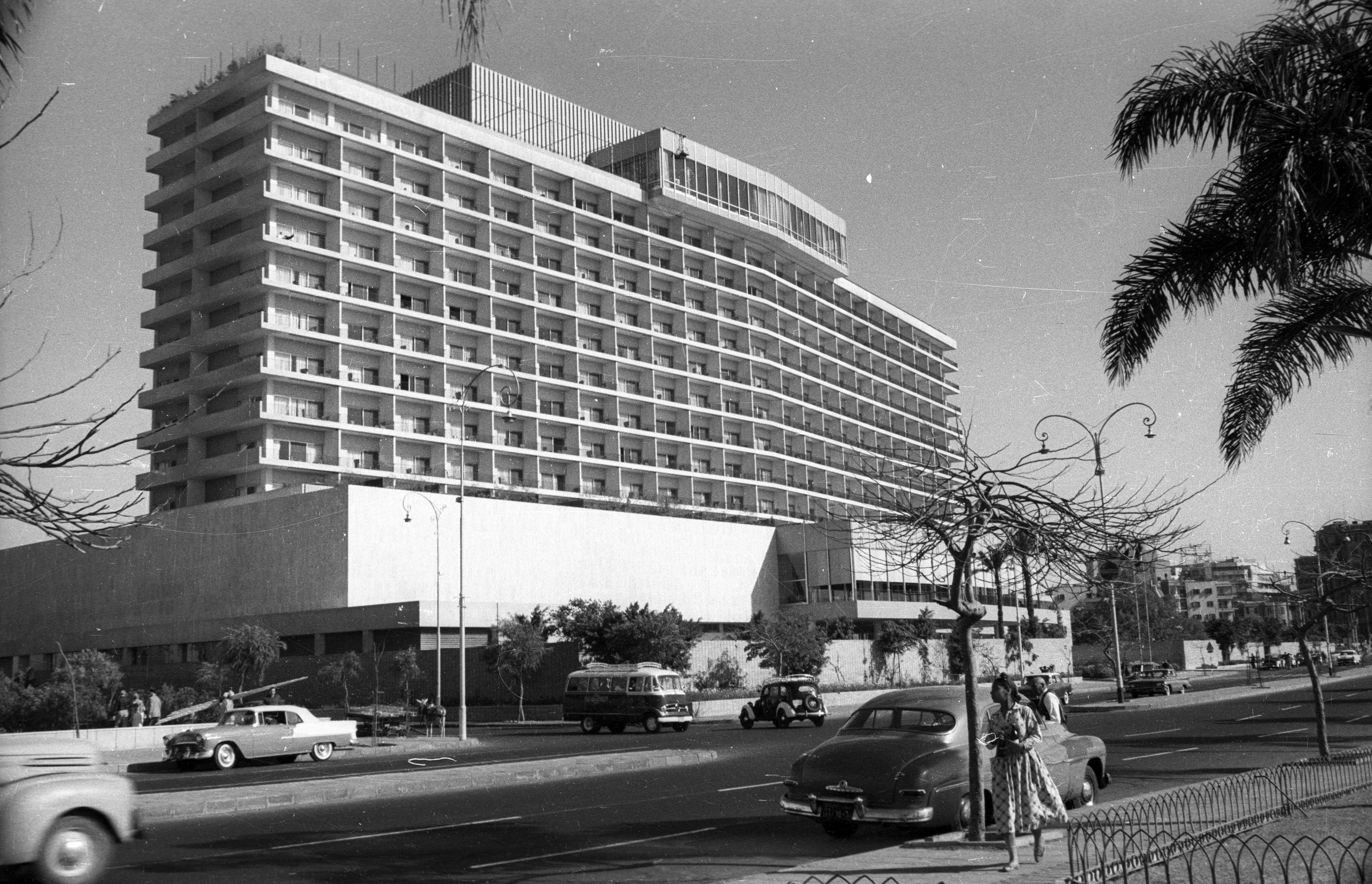
The Nile Hilton on the Cairo corniche in 1962, one of the three buildings Riad designed (this one with Welton Becket) on the river front.

In 1954, Riad was appointed as Director General of the newly created Cairo Municipality, a managerial body that was affiliated to the city's governor. There, he designed the Modern post-independence face of Cairo: planning the down town Nile facade on the ruins of the British barracks of Qasr al-Nil, and designing the thee buildings that lined it: The Arab League Headquarters, and the Cairo Municipality Building (Later used as the Arab Socialist Union's, and its successor, the National Democratic Party headquarters), and the Nile Hilton hotel (now the ile Ritz-Carlton) with the US architect Welton Becket.

Plans for Cairo's growth on the desert to its west were overseen by Riad, including Nasr City which was designed by Sayed Karim as a new administrative residential district and broke ground in 1959. Owing to his urban planning expertise in Cairo, Riad was invited to participate in the United Nations Expert Group Meetings on Metropolitan Planning in both 1959 and 1961, and was commissioned to plan the Saudi capital Riyadh, and the Jordanian capital, Amman.

After numerous disagreements with the Minister of Municipal and Village Affairs on Cairo's planning, Riad tendered his resignation in 1965 and accepted an offer as technical advisor to the Ministry of Public Works in Kuwait, where he oversaw the planning and construction of all projects taking place there until his death in 1979 - leading him to establish professional and personal relationships with the likes of Reima Pietila, Sir Colin Buchanan, and Kenzo Tange.“

== Housing policy maker ==
In 1945, Mahmoud Riad wrote a policy paper on providing affordable housing in Majallat al-Imara, stating how the housing problem was a “major national problem that should urgently garner the lion’s share of attention to ensure the peoples’ development.” Riad’s essay analyzed housing policies in a number of western European countries, singling out Austria’s interwar socialist democratic policies of Red Vienna for being the most successful in providing affordable housing, and recommending similar policies in Egypt.

Some of his policy recommendations were applied within a few years in the first large-scale public housing estate in Imbaba, designed by Ali Al-Maligi Massa'ud and which broke ground in 1947, while rent control measures codified that year drew on some of his concepts, though the more progressive of his proposals for progressive real estate taxes were not adopted.

1947 also saw Riad commissioned by a factory in the industrial Delta town of Kafr al-Dawwar to provide a plan for their workers' housing, which he supplied, significantly cutting the cost compared to similar housing. His success while still chief architect at the Ministry of Awqaf, led the Ministry of Social Affairs to ask him, along with their head of the Fellah (peasant) Department, Dr. Ahmed Hussein (credited with setting up influential rural health centers), to prepare a study to provide housing for low-income families assessing the ten-year needs at the national level. After two years, their elaborate study, Mashru'a li-tawfir Al-sakan lil-tabaqat Al-mahduda Al-dakhl fi misr (The Project to Provide Housing to Limited Income Classes in Egypt) estimated that 140,000 housing units were needed to be built annually, at the rate of 40,000 in the cities and 100,000 in the countryside, identifying that the government was the only agent that had the capacity to carry out such a program.

Taking the study seriously, the Ministry of Social Affairs founded the Department of Popular Homes in 1950, Egypt’s first high office for housing, and appointed Riad as its Director General, giving him official powers to oversee the proposed projects. The popular housing that was built during the 1950s by the state-owned Sharikat al-Ta'mir wal-masakin al-sha'biya would be built upon his, and Massau'd's concepts.

== Awards ==
- 1977 - Nominated by Richard Roth Jr., AIA, RIBA, of Emery Roth & Sons PC, to become a fellow at the American Institute of Architects, FAIA.

== Selected projects ==
- Selected Works
- Children's Hospital and Orphanage, Abassiya, Cairo. 1941.
- The Misr Insurance Company Building, Cairo. 1948.

== Writings ==
- Alexandria: Its Town Planning Development. The Town Planning Review, Vol. 15, No. 4 (Dec., 1933), pp. 233–248. [Based on the Thesis prepared by Mr. M. Riad far the Diploma in Civic Design, University of Liverpool.]
- Tahdid Al-manatiq Al-sana’iyya wa incha’ masakin Al-’ummal (The Allocation of Industrial Areas and Constructing Worker Housing)." Majallat al-Imarah 5, nos. 2 & 3 (1945): 13-18.
- Masakin Al-’ummal (Workers' Housing), Majallat Al-muhandisin. November 1947.
- - With Ahmed Hussein. Mashru'a li-tawfir Al-sakan lil-tabaqat Al-mahduda Al-dakhl fi misr (The Project to Provide Housing to Limited Income Classes in Egypt). Ministry of Social Affairs. Cairo, 1949.

== See also ==
- List of Egyptian architects
