= Ezbet El Haggana (Madinat El-Amal) =

Slum Area in Cairo, Egypt

Ezbet El Haggana / Al-kilo arba'a wa nus (Also spelt, ‘Izbit Al-Haggāna, Arabic: عزبة الهجانة / الكيلو أربعة ونص) is a 750-acre (315 HA) shiakha (census block) sub-district in the Nasr City West district, in the Eastern Area of Cairo, Egypt. In 2021, Nasr City had a third district sub-divided from Nasr City East to be named either Nasr City Third or Al-Amal, which now includes Ezbet al-Haggan. Haggana is a mostly self-built informal settlement that Mike Davis called a mega-slum, due to its supposedly large size, high population density and lack of basic infrastructure, with housing issues similar to other deprived neighbourhoods in Egypt's cities.

After a visit by President Abdel Fattah el-Sisi in February 2021, he decided to rename the community Madinat al-Amal (City of Hope, Arabic: مدينة الأمل) in light of plans to upgrade the area.

== History ==
As early as the 1930s, the Armed Forces housed their camel corps border patrol (hajjana) at the 4.5 km point in the then desert outskirts on the Cairo-Suez road. leading to the names Ezbet al-Haggana (Haggana Hamlet) and al-kilo arba'a wa nus. Over the years the camp turned into a permanent settlement as soldiers built single-storey stone structures with mud ceilings (al-suwaysi houses), until Cairo expanded east in the 1960s with the construction of the Nasr City district and the vacant desert land became valuable real estate that was initially squatted in the 1970s and later progressed into a complex system of illegal subdivision and sales, resulting in conflicts and physical altercations and the emergence of what some called a 'land mafia.'

== Demographics ==
Population estimates for Haggana varied widely over the years between 30,000 and is one million people. However, the latest 2017 Census puts it at 86,195 people, giving it a density of 115 people/acre (273/ha, 27,363/km2).

== See also ==
- Housing in Egypt
- Nasr City
