= Renpet =

Egyptian glyph

- the goddess Renpet
Name in hieroglyphs
M5

Renpet was, in the Egyptian language, the word for "year". Its hieroglyph was figuratively depicted in art as a woman wearing a palm shoot (symbolizing time) over her head. She was often referred to as the Mistress of Eternity and also personified fertility, youth and spring. The glyph regularly appears on monuments and documents throughout Egyptian history as the beginning of the phrase recording the regnal year of the pharaoh.

== See also ==
- Palm branch
- Heh (god)
- Seshat
- Renpetneferet
