= Tiba Outlet Mall =

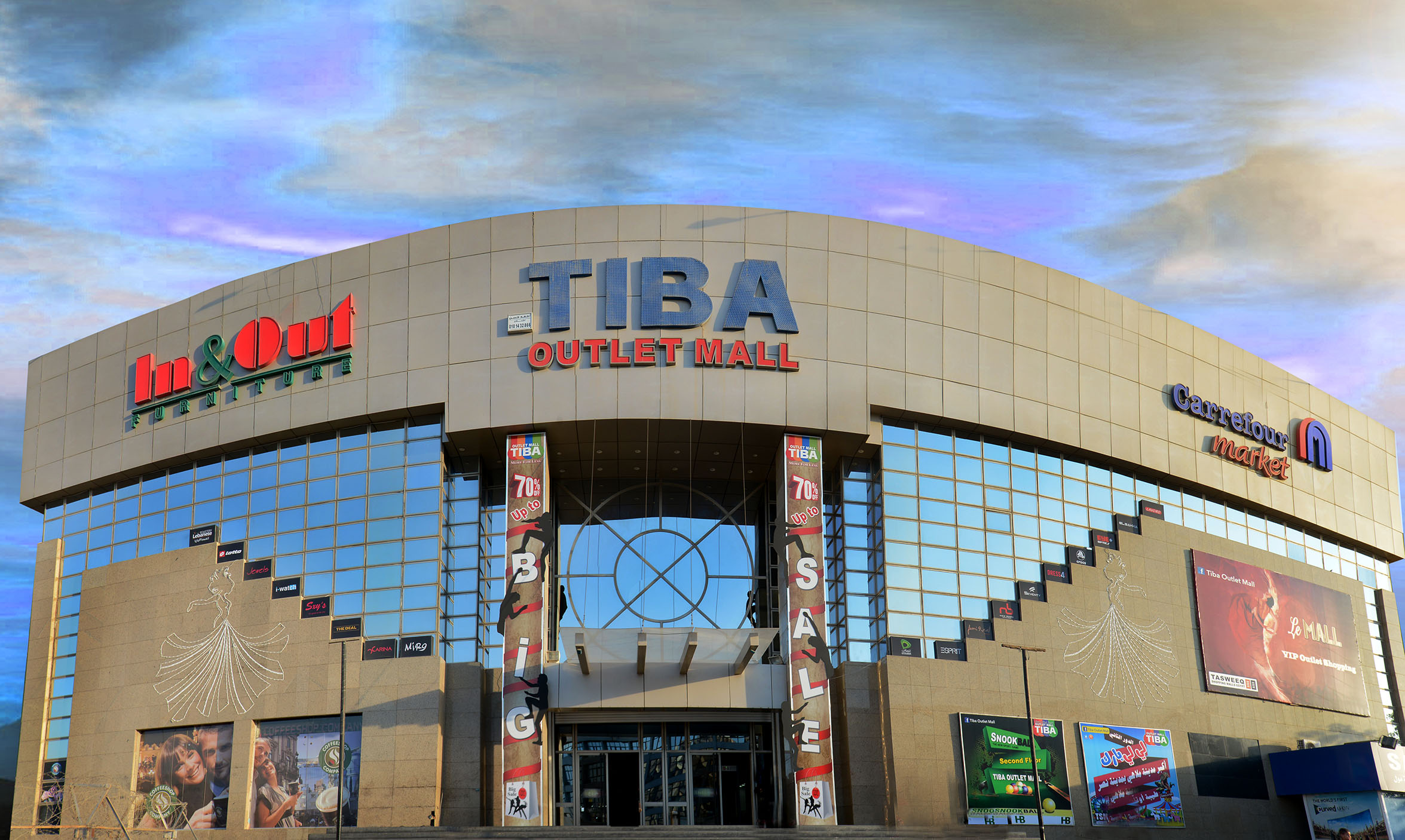
- Location: Cairo, Egypt
- Coordinates: 30°3′59.9″N 31°19′11.1″E
- Opened: 2011
- Manager: TSM
- Num. of stores: 34
- Floor area: 30,850 sq ft (2,866 m^{2})
- Floors: 4
- Parking: 107
- Website: tibaoutletmall.com

Tiba Outlet Mall is the first outlet mall built in Egypt as part of Nasr City in Cairo. It was opened in 2011. The 30,850 sq ft (2,866 m^{2}) mall contains more than 34 retail outlets, an amusement park, dining and entertainment, a cinema along with an underground parking garage capable of holding 107 vehicles, and a Carrefour supermarket.
