= Imhotep =

Egyptian polymath, later deified

- chancellor to the King Djoser and High Priest of Ra
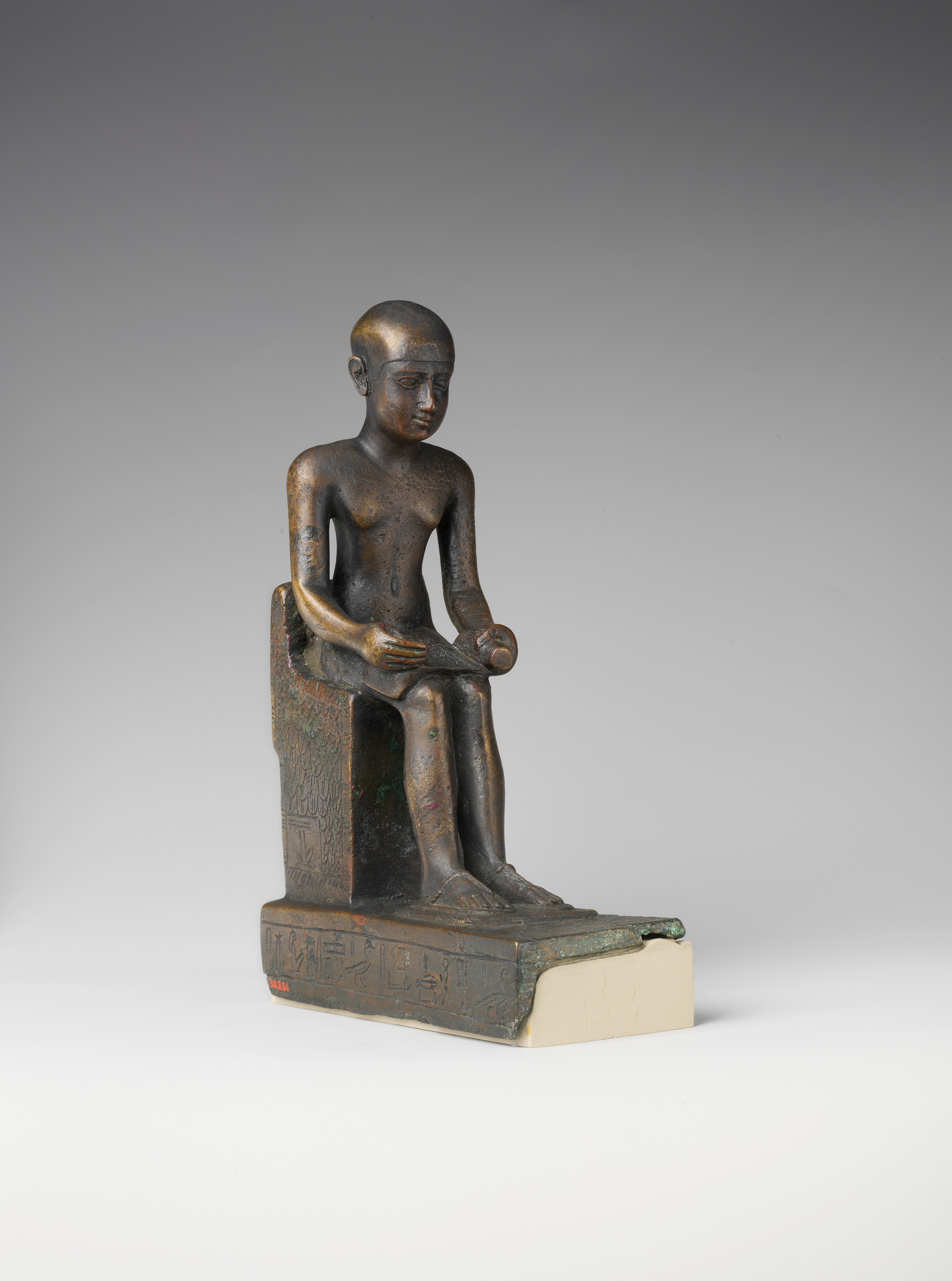
- Statuette of Imhotep, 664–30 BC
- Egyptian name: Ancient Egyptian: Jj m ḥtp
- Tenure: c. 27th century BC
- Burial: Saqqara (probable)
- Siblings: Djoser (disputed)

Imhotep in hieroglyphs
M18 G17 R4 X1 Q3
Imhotep
Jj m ḥtp
He who comes in peace
M18 G17 R4
Jj m ḥtp
M17 M17 G17 R4 X1 Q3
Jj m ḥtp
M17 M17 G17 R4
Jj m ḥtp
- Greek Manetho variants: Africanus: Imouthes; Eusebius: missing; Eusebius, AV: missing

Imhotep (/ɪmˈhoʊtɛp/; Ancient Egyptian: ỉỉ-m-ḥtp "(the one who) comes in peace"; fl. late 27th century BC) was an Egyptian chancellor to the King Djoser, possible architect of Djoser's step pyramid, and high priest of the sun god Ra at Heliopolis. Very little is known of Imhotep as a historical figure, but in the 3,000 years following his death, he was gradually glorified and deified.

Traditions from long after Imhotep's death treated him as a great author of wisdom texts and especially as a physician. No extant text from his lifetime mentions these capacities, and none mention his name in the first 1,200 years following his death. The Westcar Papyrus of the Hyksos period, written in classical Middle Egyptian (likely around the 13th Dynasty), contains a story about an official performing a miracle for Djoser, possibly Imhotep. However, this section is badly damaged and no mention of this character's name survived.

Apart from the two short contemporary inscriptions that establish him as chancellor to the Pharaoh, the first surviving text to name Imhotep dates to the time of Amenhotep III (c. 1391–1353 BC). It is addressed to the owner of a tomb and reads:

The wab-priest may give offerings to your ka. The wab-priests may stretch to you their arms with libations on the soil, as it is done for Imhotep with the remains of the water bowl.

— Wildung (1977)

It appears that this libation to Imhotep was done regularly, as they are attested on papyri associated with statues of Imhotep until the Late Period (c. 664–332 BC). Wildung (1977) explains the origin of this cult as a slow evolution of intellectuals' memory of Imhotep, from his death onward. Gardiner finds the cult of Imhotep during the New Kingdom (c. 1550–1077 BC) sufficiently distinct from the usual offerings made to other commoners that the epithet "demigod" is likely justified to describe his veneration.

The first references to the healing abilities of Imhotep occur from the Thirtieth Dynasty (c. 380–343 BC) onward, some 2,200 years after his death.

Imhotep is among fewer than a dozen non-royal Egyptians who were deified after their deaths. The center of his cult was in Memphis. The location of his tomb remains unknown, despite efforts to find it.

== Historicity ==
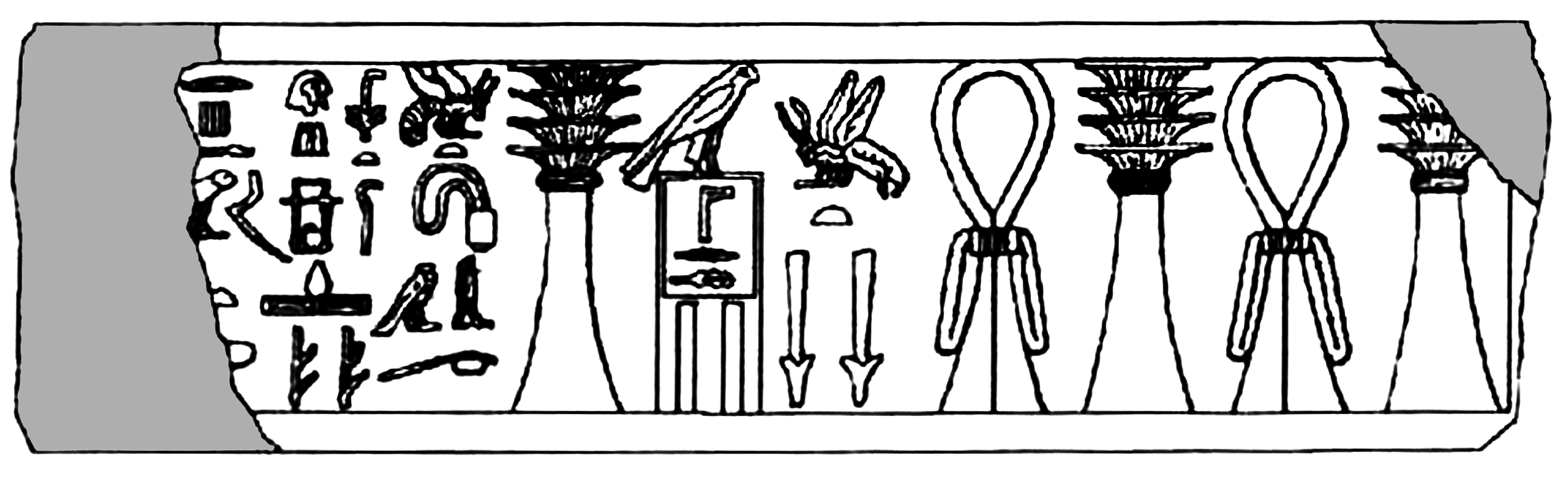
Drawing of statue JE 49889 base inscription, which mentions Imhotep

Imhotep's historicity is confirmed by two contemporary inscriptions made during his lifetime on the base or pedestal of one of Djoser's statues (Cairo JE 49889) and also by a graffito on the enclosure wall surrounding Sekhemkhet's unfinished step pyramid. The latter inscription suggests that Imhotep outlived Djoser by a few years and went on to serve in the construction of King Sekhemkhet's pyramid, which was abandoned due to this ruler's brief reign.

Imhotep held the ambiguous title bity sensen or bity senwy, unique in ancient Egyptian history. This literally translates as "the King of Lower Egypt, the two brothers", and could be interpreted to mean that Imhotep might have been twin brother of Pharaoh, which would explain his high position; with no known individuals with similar titles, however, interpretation remains highly speculative. If not a blood relative, he might have been the King's confidant or childhood friend.

=== Architecture and engineering ===
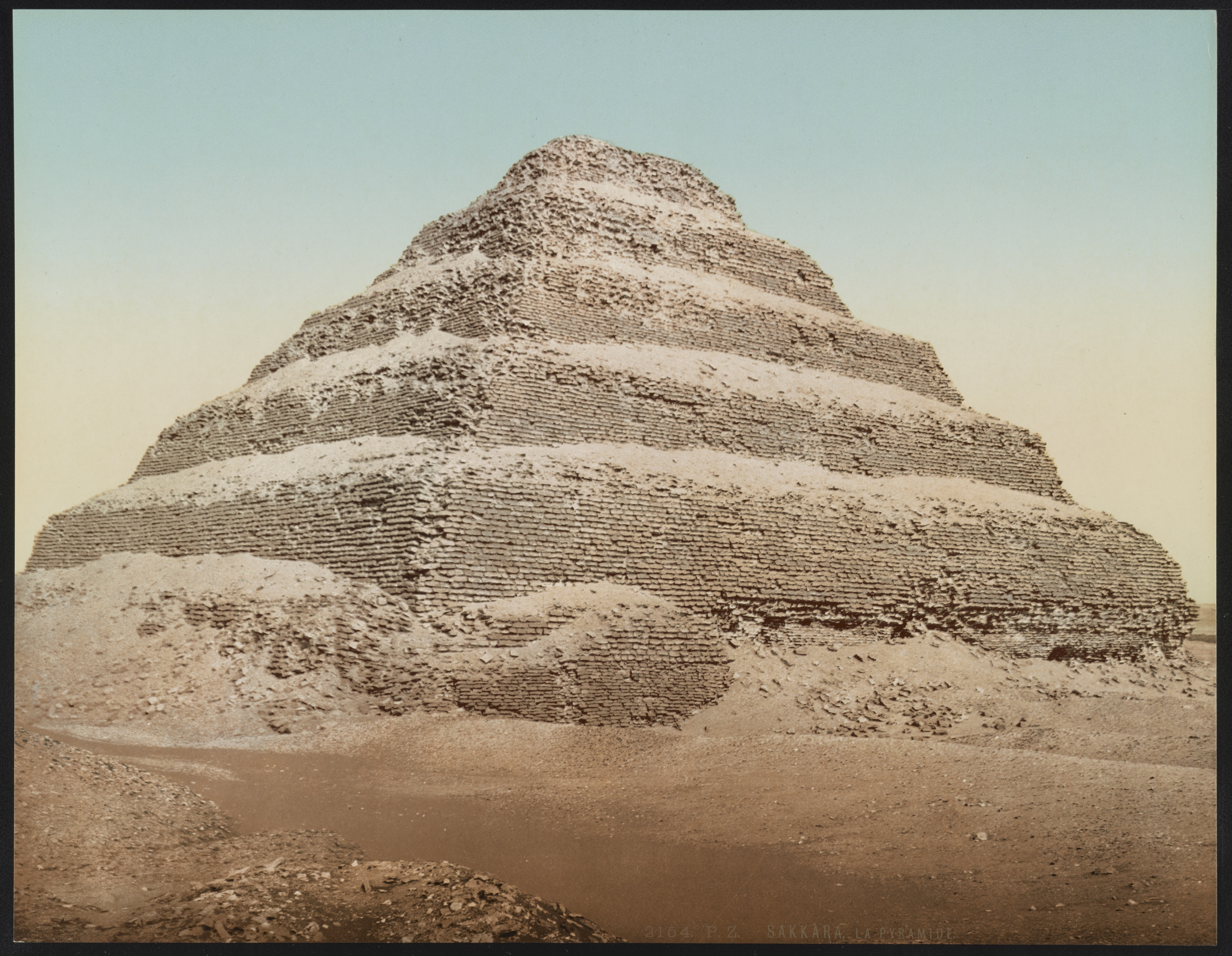
The step pyramid of Djoser

Imhotep was one of the chief officials of the Pharaoh Djoser. Concurring with much later legends, Egyptologists credit him with the design and construction of the Pyramid of Djoser, a step pyramid at Saqqara built during the 3rd Dynasty. He may also have been responsible for the first known use of stone columns to support a building. Despite these later attestations, the pharaonic Egyptians themselves never credited Imhotep as the designer of the stepped pyramid, nor with the invention of stone architecture.

== Deification ==
=== God of medicine ===
Imhotep
Name in hieroglyphs
ii m Htp t p
- Major cult center: Memphis

Genealogy
- Parents: Ptah and Sekhmet or Khereduankh
- Siblings: Amenhotep, son of Hapu, Renpetneferet (sometimes wife)
- Consort: Renpetneferet (sometimes sister)

Equivalents
- Greek: Asclepius

Two thousand years after his death, Imhotep's status had risen to that of a god of medicine and healing. Eventually, Imhotep was equated with Thoth, the god of architecture, mathematics, and medicine, and patron of scribes: Imhotep's cult was merged with that of his own former tutelary god.

He was revered in the region of Thebes as the "brother" of Amenhotep, son of Hapu – another deified architect – in the temples dedicated to Thoth. Because of his association with health, the Greeks equated Imhotep with Asklepios, their own god of health who also was a deified mortal.

According to myth, Imhotep's mother was a mortal named Khereduankh, she too being eventually revered as a demi-goddess as the daughter of Banebdjedet. Alternatively, since Imhotep was known as the "Son of Ptah", his mother was sometimes claimed to be Sekhmet, the patron of Upper Egypt whose consort was Ptah.

=== Post-Alexander period ===
The Upper Egyptian Famine Stela, which dates from the Ptolemaic period (305–30 BC), bears an inscription containing a legend about a famine lasting seven years during the reign of Djoser. Imhotep is credited with having been instrumental in ending it. One of his priests explained the connection between the god Khnum and the rise of the Nile to the Pharaoh, who then had a dream in which the Nile god spoke to him, promising to end the drought.

A demotic papyrus from the temple of Tebtunis, dating to the 2nd century AD, preserves a long story about Imhotep. The Pharaoh Djoser plays a prominent role in the story, which also mentions Imhotep's family; his father the god Ptah, his mother Khereduankh, and his younger sister Renpetneferet. At one point Djoser desires Renpetneferet, and Imhotep disguises himself and tries to rescue her. The text also refers to the royal tomb of Djoser. Part of the legend includes an anachronistic battle between the Old Kingdom and the Assyrian armies where Imhotep fights an Assyrian sorceress in a duel of magic.

As an instigator of Egyptian culture, Imhotep's idealized image lasted well into the Roman period. In the Ptolemaic period, the Egyptian priest and historian Manetho credited him with inventing the method of a stone-dressed building during Djoser's reign, although he was not the first to actually build with stone. Stonewalling, flooring, lintels, and jambs had appeared sporadically during the Archaic Period, even though it is true that a building the size of the step pyramid made entirely out of stone had never before been constructed. Before Djoser, Kings were buried in mastaba tombs.

=== Medicine ===
Egyptologist James Peter Allen states that "The Greeks equated him with their own god of medicine, Asklepios, although ironically, there is no evidence that Imhotep himself was a physician."

In his Pulitzer-prize winning “biography” of cancer – The Emperor of All Maladies – Siddhartha Mukherjee cites the oldest identified written diagnosis of cancer to Imhotep.

== In popular culture ==
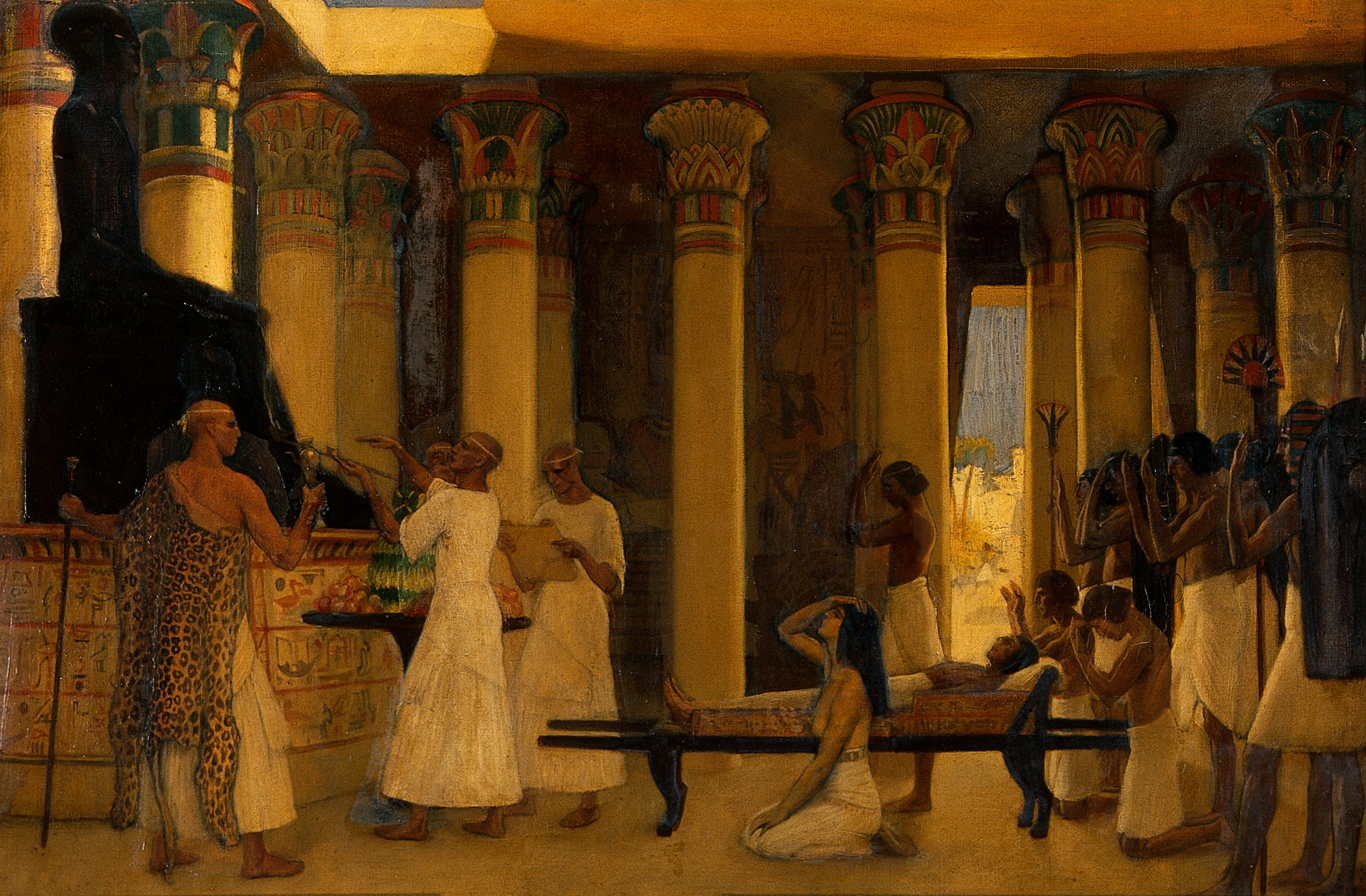
Ernest Board: An invocation to I-em-hetep, the Egyptian deity of medicine, c. 1912

Imhotep's name is shared by the antagonist of the 1932 film The Mummy, along with its 1999 remake and the latter's 2001 sequel.

== See also ==
- Imhotep Museum
- History of ancient Egypt
- Ancient Egyptian architecture
- Ancient Egyptian medicine
- List of Egyptian Architects
- Enheduanna
