= Mit Okba =

Mit Okba Mit Akaba ميِّت عُّقْبة
- Location in Egypt
- Coordinates: 30.060774°N 31.195407°E
- Country: Egypt
- Governorate: Giza
- Time zone: UTC+2 (EET)
  - Summer (DST): UTC+3 (EEST)

Mit Okba or Mit Akaba (Arabic: ميِّت عُّقْبة) is a former village, that was incorporated in the 1950s as two shiakhas (census blocks) in the Agouza district of Giza, Egypt, as the real estate development of Madinat al-Awqaf was built on its fields. Many of the original houses, and much of the narrow street fabric remains today.

== History ==
It was founded by Uqba bin Amir al-Guhni in 665. The ancient Coptic Theotokos church (which also could be a monastery) used to be in Mit Okba which Copts called tiMone enAkope (Coptic: ϯⲙⲟⲛⲏ ⲛ̀ⲁⲕⲟⲡⲉ).
