= Nasr City =

Nasr City مدينة نصر Victory City
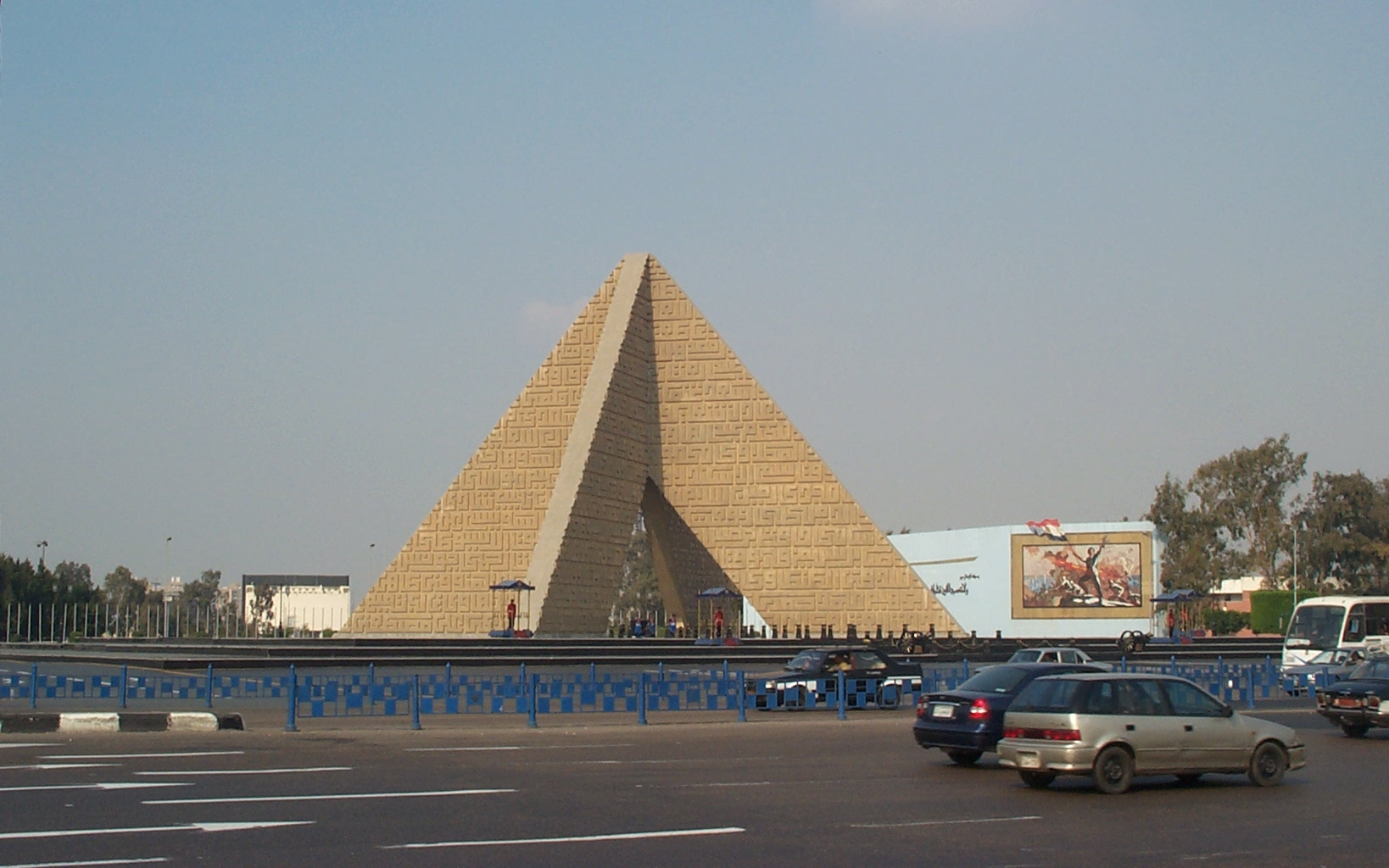
- Memorial to the Unknown Soldier (Sadat’s burial site)

- Location within Egypt Location within Africa
- Coordinates: 30°3′7.624″N 31°20′31.936″E

Government
  - City leader: Major General Mohamed El-Sheikh

Area
  - Total: 90 km^{2} (35 sq mi)

Population (2023)
  - Total: 77,529
- Time zone: UTC+2 (EET)
  - Summer (DST): UTC+3 (EEST)

Nasr City / Victory City (Egyptian Arabic: مدينة نصر, romanized: Victory City pronounced [mæˈdiːnɪt ˈnɑsˤɾ]) forms two of the nine districts of the Eastern Area of Cairo, Egypt. It is administratively divided into Nasr City West/One (Gharb Madinet Nasr/awwal), (Victory City I) and Nasr City East/Two (Sharq Madinet Nasr/thani) (Victory City II). In 2021, Nasr City had a third district sub-divided from Nasr City East to be named either Nasr City Third or Al-Amal, (Victory City III) as well as a qism (police ward) named Nasr City Third.

== History ==
Nasr City was established in the 1960s as an extension to the neighboring settlement of Heliopolis. The establishment of the district was part of the Egyptian Government's plan to modernise and expand Cairo following the Egyptian Revolution of 1952. Gamal Abdel Nasser, the Egyptian President at the time, was involved personally in the design process, and was the one who chose the name Nasr for the new district ("nasr" being the Arabic word for "victory"). During the early stages of the project it was envisioned that it would constitute a new capital city, though it just became a suburb of Cairo.

Nasr City was planned by architect and urban planner Sayed Karim on a modern grid street system with calculated building heights, densities and land uses. However, many of the original family homes have since been demolished to make way for illegal residential 'towers' that have heavily densified it.

== Municipal divisions and demographics ==
Nasr City is the largest neighbourhood in Cairo by area, occupying nearly 250 km^{2} (97 sq mi) of the capital's total area of 1,445 km^{2} (558 sq mi). For this reason, it is divided into two districts (hayy): East Madīnat Naṣr (Qism Awwal) and West Madīnat Naṣr (Qism Than), and 25 sub-districts that have become shiakhas (non-administrative census blocks), that have a mix of names, and numbers (see table below). In addition to the planned sub-districts, Nasr City is home to two self-built informal areas: Ezbet al-Haggana and Ezbet al-Nasr.

As of the 2017 census, Nasr City had a total population of 707,000 people:

East Madinat Nasr (Qism Awwal): 634,818

Shiakha	Code 2017	Population
Tawfîq, al-	014001	10,259
Sharikât, al-	014002	3,422
Gûlf (Golf), al-	014003	30,817
Nâdî al-Ahlî, al-	014004	16,210
Manṭiqa 9, al-	014005	13,098
Manṭiqa 10, al-	014006	9,201
Ḥayy 10, al-	014007	57,020
Manṭiqa 1, al-	014008	26,249
Manṭiqa 6, al-	014009	80,313
Manṭiqa 8, al-	014010	45,771
Wafâ’ et al.-Amal, al-	014011	17,970
Ḥadîqa al-Dawliyya, al- (International Garden)	014012	14,699
Manṭiqa 7, al-	014013	21,924
Râbi`a al-`Adawiyya	014014	1,316
Sharq al-Manṭiqa 7	014015	31,540
`Izbat al-Hajjâna	014016	165,785
Masâkin al-Muhandisîn	014017	14,492
Manṭiqat al-Sînamâ (Cinema)	014018	2,710
Zahrâ' Madînat Naṣr	014019	72,022

West Madinat Nasr (Qism Than): 72,182.

Shiakha	Code 2017	Population
Ḥayy 7, al-	014101	5,435
Ḥayy 6, al-	014102	9,138
Istâd, al- (Stadium)	014103	15,734
Sarayât al-sharqiyya, al-	014104	6,657
`Izbat al-`Arab	014106	32,390
Nâdî al-Sikka al-Ḥadîd (Club)	014107	2,828

== Culture ==
When catching a microbus, minibus or even a CTA bus, specific hand signs may be used. These signs include putting the index and middle fingers in an upwards "V", which is the Hindi numeral ٧, for the 7th district, placing those fingers upside down in a downwards "V", which is the Hindi number ٨ for the 8th district, or putting out a hand and slowly opening and closing the fingers slightly above the start of the palm for the 10th district.

The district is home to many socioeconomic strata. During Ramadan, the comparative wealth of districts can be determined by whether there are electric lights or simply colored flags. The 10th district of Nasr City is home to refugees and immigrants of various countries, such as Sudan, Somalia, Nigeria, China, Malaysia, and even the United States. There are many mosques, such as the Masjid al Nour al Mohamedi or Masjid El Ghofran. Also, there are falafel stands, shawarma restaurants, a koshari restaurant near the main road, and pharmacies. Due to the proximity to the airport, there are often planes flying overhead.

Nasr City is home to the new premises of Al-Azhar University, the Cairo International Conference Center, Cairo International Stadium, a branch of the Ahly Club, Saint Fatima School and several government buildings. Among its major landmarks is the pyramid-like Unknown Soldier Memorial honoring the Egyptian and other Arab servicemen killed in the October War of 1973. The Memorial is opposite the grandstand at which President Sadat was assassinated, and is where Sadat himself is buried. The Revolution has led to the presence of colorful graffiti on the road from Masjid al Salaam in the 8th subdistrict to the Ahly branch in Nasr City. This branch was established in 1993 and today has a swimming pool complex, a large soccer field, more than 10 tennis and table tennis courts, a track where members can exercise, a gym equipped with the best modern equipment, and many stores and restaurants in addition to a main library for Al-Ahly. Members can enter for free, but non-members must pay 40 Egyptian pounds for a ticket during normal weekdays, 50 pounds during weekends and 60 pounds during national holidays. Nasr City also has many mosques, and during the times of prayer, one may hear multiple live adhans preceded and followed by Quranic recitation. Sometimes, the prayers themselves are broadcast through the loudspeakers.

== Education ==
Nasr City is overpopulated, and as such there are numerous schools found in the district. This section will list only a few of the many educational options for children in grades K-12. Private schools offering the Egyptian curriculum include Roots Language school, Harvard Egypt college, Alahram language school, Al Bayan Modern school, Al Manhal school, a branch of Futures Educational systems, one of Nermien Ismail National school's branches, the Egyptian Language school, El Alson language schools, and El Andalaus Azharian schools. Public experimental schools (offering the national curriculum in English) include El Sedeek Experimental school, Ibn El Nafees Experimental school, Elmostakbal language experimental schools, and Abbas El Akkad Experimental schools. Ordinary public schools (offering the national curriculum in Arabic) can be found in every neighbourhood. International options include the Futures Educational Systems American school and the Roots International school (British curriculum). Manaret Heliopolis International School is the only International Baccalaureate (IB) School in the district. Assignment to public schools or experimental schools is generally based on location and siblings' current school and is supervised by the Egyptian Ministry of Education and Child Development. Application to private schools is difficult, and usually begins in the preschool (age 3–4) or KG (age 5–6) levels. However, due to Nasr City's central location, residents of the district can easily send their children to private schools in the neighboring New Cairo (to the east), Heliopolis (to the northwest) and Maadi (to the southwest) districts, with minimum commute.

== Shopping ==
Nasr City has a large concentration of shopping malls (Genena Mall, Tiba Outlet Mall, City Center, Serag Mall, City Stars, Suncity Mall). There are eight shopping malls in the area, where City Stars is one of the largest malls in Egypt, most of which were opened in the late 1990s. There was a dramatic growth of shopping malls in the neighborhood, and they were generally more successful than similar enterprises in other parts of Cairo. One of the main reasons for the success of these commercial centers is the simple grid environment of Nasr City. The district has no town/city center and consists of long, wide streets, with roundabouts, and perpendicular streets.

Nasr City has a variety of shops and leisure spaces including restaurants, coffee shops, and cinemas. The malls are usually very crowded during holidays and summer nights, while the fast-food restaurants and coffee shops remain open and busy until late at night. Late night shopping is popular in Cairo, especially in summer, and thus the malls do not open until around 11am, and peak hours begin around 10pm. Also, each sub-district has its own market, or souq, where one can buy fresh fruit, vegetables, and slaughtered meat. The souq in the 8th district of Nasr City is located next to a gas station five minutes away by foot from the Sedeek Language School. It has a live poultry and livestock section, many fruit and vegetable stands, and a seafood section in the back. Many children of the stand owners work in the market, carrying people's purchases for them, or helping to stock the stands or watch the animals. The 10th district of Nasr City has the biggest market, with at least 3 butchers, 5-6 large fruit and vegetable stands, multiple clothing stores, and slightly crowded streets.

The architecture and decoration of the newly built shopping malls of Nasr City are influenced greatly by building designs in the Gulf and Southeast Asia. The architecture of the Wonderland Mall is marked by its Oriental aspects while the design of the Geneina Mall, with its transparent glass elevators, resembles the design of Southeast Asian malls in Singapore, Malaysia, and Indonesia. Some of the malls in Nasr City, like the Serag, and Geneina malls, have associate housing and apartments above the shopping spaces. Although these malls are in close proximity with to another, there is no strict competition between them as most cater to different types of customers. Tiba Outlet Mall, for instance, is regarded as a family mall, while the Geneina Mall is popular among teenagers and youngsters due to its bowling alley, billiard center, and discothèque. The Serag Mall is located in the 8th district of Nasr City, and it contains the al-Mahmal hypermarket, several clothing stores, and aquatic bumper cars in the main lobby for young children. There is also a restaurant, lamaelrawi, a cinema, and Multiple Shisha bars.

These contemporary malls are exclusive and closely monitored spaces with tight security surveillance. They often demand specific behaviour and dress code from the visitors. In 1999, some malls like the World Trade Center and the as-Hurriya Mall, put restrictions on visitors wearing gallabiyas, traditional long robes that are often worn by males of the lower classes. These measures were taken by shopping mall managers in order to filter the public and stop people of lower classes from intruding the commercial space. The restriction on people wearing gallabiyas was later lifted due to the influx of Gulf visitors who also commonly wear such garments.

For many, Nasr City symbolizes Cairo's nouveau-riche suburban culture that has been influenced greatly by the lifestyles of the Gulf region. This is because an influx of middle class professionals and returning migrant workers from the Gulf countries purchased property in Nasr City and settled there.

== Transportation ==
Public buses that go to Nasr City include Buses 1, 12, 72,82, 84, 121,125, 66, 132, 302, 304, 184, 137, 138, 120, 727, 80, 10, 126, 132, 19, 314, 65, 939, M1 and M2.

The line number 3 of the Cairo Metro passes Nasr City at the Fair Zone and Stadium stations.

== See also ==
- Heliopolis (Cairo suburb)
- Ezbet al-Haggana
- Sayid Karim
- Madinet Nasr for Housing and Development - www.mnhd.com
