= Sayed Karim =

Egyptian architect

- Born: 16 February 1911; Monufia
- Died: 28 July 2005 (aged 94); Cairo
- Education: Cairo University, University of Zurich
- Occupation: Architect
- Children: Ibrahim Karim, Chahinda Karim
- Parent: Ibrahim Fahmy Karim
- Practice: Architect, urban planner, writer
- Projects: Nasr City
- Website: Sayed Karim

Sayed Karim (Also Sayyid Karim. Arabic: سيد كريم) (born; 16 February 1911, Mit Barrah, Munufia – 28 July 2005, Cairo) was a leading Egyptian Modernist architect, who was part of the liberal era's 'pioneer architects'. He was also an urban planner, best known for designing the Nasr City neighbourhood in Cairo, as well as a writer and editor producing the influential architecture magazine Majallat al-'Imarah, and authoring a number of books.

== Education and academia ==
Karim received his Diploma in Architecture from Cairo University in 1933, before leaving for Switzerland where he pursued another diploma at the University of Zurich, ocompleting it in 1935, and then a Masters in urban planning in 1936. Sayed Karim received his PhD in architecture at the ETH Zurich in 1938, while teaching there, before moving back to Egypt in 1938 and becoming a professor at Cairo University.

== Architecture and planning ==
Karim set up his private practice in Cairo in 1939, launching a career that spanned over half a century. He designed iconic public and residential buildings in Cairo, including a proposal for The Egyptian Journalists’ Syndicate (1946), Akhbar Al Youm (1948), Rose al-Yusuf (1952), Al-Shams Company building (1949) and the Zamalek Tower (1956).

One of his main drivers was a question about 'what can a national style be in Egypt, and how to promote it. Karim has dealt with this question in an exhaustive and authentic way, calling on other disciplines such as sociology, psychology, but also the history of art and architecture, and holding conferences around it, including one at the Geographical Society in April 1940.

As an urban planner, Karim lamented the missed opportunity to rebuild Cairo according to modernist planning scheme that could have come if Cairo was damaged in World War II, as were so many other cities, and rebuilt according to more modernist principles. Not to be defeated, he proposed plans for Cairo's urban expansion, namely Nasr City, which was envisioned in 1953 and implemented under the direction of the head of Cairo Municipality, Mahmoud Riad from 1959 as a new administrative center.

Karim was active not just in Egypt, but the Arab world. After joining the United Nations as a city planning consultant in 1949, he worked on plans and architectural designs for Baghdad (1946), Damascus (1947), Jeddah (1949), Riyadh (1950), and Amman (1954), and many other cities, earning him the nickname "the flying architect."

In 1965, however, the Nasser regime put him under sequestration and house arrest – a move from which the architect never recovered, prematurely curbing his career.

=== Public buildings ===
- Dar Akhbar Al-Youm HQ, Republic of Egypt, 1948
- Rose Al-Youssef HQ 1952
- Al-Masry Press 1941
- Middle East House Building 1960
- The role of the press abroad
- Printing and publishing house, Jeddah, 1948
- Printing and Publishing House Kuwait City 1954
- Printing and publishing house, Riyadh, 1949

== Positions ==
- Assistant Professor at the University of Zurich, Switzerland, 1937.
- Professor of Architecture, Cairo University, 1938.
- Registered the first consulting office in Egypt for architecture and planning 1939.
- Issued the first architecture and arts magazine in Egypt in 1939.
- The first Egyptian engineer to be appointed as a consultant and expert in the Technical Assistance Authority and a member of the Experts Committee 1954.

== Majallat al-'Imarah ==
Majallat al-'Imarah (also titled Emara, Alemara Alefoun) was published between 1939 and 1950, with the exception of 1943–1944. The publication was later continued as "Majallat al-Imarah wa-al-Funun" between 1952 and 1959.

Largely the project of editor Sayyid Karim, Majallat al-Imarah presented contemporary architecture in pre-war and post-war Cairo. A near comprehensive collection is digitally held by ArchNet, which were sourced at the Fine Arts Library of the Harvard College Library.

== Writings and archive ==
- Pour un style national de l’architecture en Égypte. al-’imara, n° 5/6 de 1940, pp. 271–275.
- Majallat al-'Imarah digital archive on ArchNet
- Sayed Karim Archive at the American University in Cairo's RARE BOOKS AND SPECIAL COLLECTIONS LIBRARY (RBSCL).
- Newspaper articles

Further reading

- Mercedes Volait. L’ARCHITECTURE MODERNE EN ÉGYPTE ET LA REVUE AL-’IMARA: 1939–1959. CEDEJ – Égypte/Soudan. 1998.
