= Milad Hanna =

Egyptian political activist (1924–2012)

Milad Hanna (24 June 1924, Shubra, Cairo – 26 November 2012, Cairo) was an Egyptian civil engineer, professor, parliamentarian, political activist and a prolific writer who "carried the humanist conscience of a multicultural Egypt, united in all its diversity." In addition to teaching and practising as a civil engineer, Hanna was politically active for most of his life, fighting for many causes, chief of which were religious equality for Copts, and access to housing for the poor. Hanna is known for his observation that "there are dwellings without dwellers, and dwellers without dwellings," summing up the situation in 1980s Egypt as there being a large housing crisis even though hundreds of thousands of homes stood vacant, and echoed by experts and housing rights observers for decades.

== Education, academia and practice ==
Hanna received his bachelors in civil engineering from Cairo University in 1945, and from 1945 to 1947, he lectured at Alexandria University. Hanna, inspired by Coptic nationalist and politician Makram Ebeid, who was also MP for his district, moved to Scotland in 1947 to pursue a PhD at the University of St. Andrews, which he received in 1950.

Upon his return to Egypt, Hanna became an assistant manager with the Roads and Bridges Authority, supervising the construction of the Sohag-Akhmim Bridge in Upper Egypt, After that, Hanna started his main career as an academic in 1953 teaching at Ain Shams in Cairo, where he became full professor in 1984.

As many engineers in Egypt do, Hanna set up his own consultancy in 1955 naming it his 'second wife', which brought him "economic security" to be able to pursue his political efforts.

== Political career ==
In his late thirties, Hanna joined the Nationalist Movement (al-haraka al-qawmiya) against the British occupation of Egypt. After Egypt's independence and the July 1952 Revolution, Hanna was asked by Free Officer Khaled Mohieddin in 1957 to write on housing issues for the government owned newspaper Al Messa.

In the wake of Egypt's defeat to Israel in the 1967 Naksa, Hanna joined student protests in 1968 against the acquittal of a number of officers. As a professor, security reports recorded his dissent and reached interior minister Sharawi Gomaa, who would have either imprisoned Hanna, or at best had him expelled from university had a high level friend not intervened. This close encounter established a long friendship between Hanna and Gomaa, where the latter asked for reports and insights into housing issues that reached him through his post as secretary general of the secret Vanguards Organisation (al-tanzim al-tali'i), or president Gamal Abdel Nasser himself.

Hanna's career as a policy analyst would be formalised in 1976 when was invited by Mohieldiin as a founding member of the Leftist Tagamuu' Party, joining its policy committee and becoming its external relations manager.

However, his opposition to policies would this time land him in jail in the infamous September Arrests of 1981: writing against the housing policies of then housing minister, Osman Ahmed Osman, and his outburst at president Sadat's speech on the 1980 May 15 anniversary proclaiming himself the Muslim president of a Muslim Egypt, which Hanna saw as making the country exclusionary to Copts.

Sadat's assassination only one month later led to the swift release of those arrested including Hanna, who in June 1984 was one of the presidential appointees to that year's parliament (lower house), where he was elected as head of the Housing Committee. Hanna resigned from the committee after only two years when he felt his views were not welcome, and from political life in 1987 when parliament was dissolved, focusing on his work as an engineer, columnist and writer.

== Writings ==
=== Books and papers on housing ===
- Al-ab'ad al-ijtima'iya wal-handasiya lil-maskan al-sha'bi (Social and engineering dimensions for popular homes). Paper presented at the 5th Arab Ministers of Social Affairs Conference, Baghdad, 1978.
- Uridu Maskan: Mushkila laha hal. Rose al-Youssef, 1978.
- Studies and Working Papers on Housing Issues in Egypt (In Arabic). Majlis al-Sha'b (parliament, lower house, limited publication), 1985.
- Real estate rights in urban Egypt: the changing sociopolitical winds, in: Property, social structure, and law in the modern Middle East / edited by Ann Elizabeth Mayer, SUNY Press, 1985.
- Al-Iskaan wal-Masyada (Housing and The Trap) Dar al-mustaqbal al-arabi, 1988.
  - French translation: Le logement en Égypte: Essai critique. CEDEJ – Égypte/Soudan, 1992
- Hagat al-Insan al-Arabi lil-Iskan wal-Kesaa (The Arab's Need For Housing And Clothing). The Arab Institute for Planning, Kuwait, 1991.
- Al-Iskan wal- Siyaasa (Housing and Politics). Al-hay'a al-misriya al-'ama li-l-kitab, 1996.

=== Books on religious tension and Egypt ===
- Na`am aqbat lakin misriyun (Yes Copts but also Egyptians). Maktabat Madbuli, 1980.
- Al-A'meda al-Saba'a Lil-Shakhsiya al-Misriya. Dar al-hilal, 1989.
  - English translation: The Seven Pillars of the Egyptian Identity. General Egyptian Book Organisation, 1994.
- Misr li kul al-misriyin (Egypt is for all Egyptians). Dar suad al-Sabbah, 1993.
- Sira' al-hadarat wal-badil al-insani (With Ahmed Ibrahim Mahmoud). al-Ahram Center for Political and Strategic Studies, 1995.
- Sasa wa ruhban wara' al-qudban (Politicians and clergymen behind bars). Jarīdat al-Ahāly, 1997.
- Quboul al-Akhar. Dar al-Shorouk, 1998.
  - Swedish translation: Att erkänna den andre. Alhambra, 2003.
  - English translation: Acceptance of the Other. Farid Atiya Press, 2005.
- With Mohamed Sadeq al-Husseiny and al-Sadiq al-Mahdi: Al-muthaqaf al-arabi wal-akhar: bayn al-rafd wal-qubul wal-lamubalah (The Arab intellectual and the other: Between rejection, acceptance and ignorance). Dar al-maarif, 2000.
- With Haidar Ibrahim Ali. Azmat al-aqaliyat fil-watan al-arabi (The crisis of minorities in the Arab world). Dar al-fikr al-arabi, 2002.

=== Memoirs ===
- Zikrayat sibtambiriya (September Memories). Dar al – Mustaqbal al-Arabi, 1986.
- Al-insihar al-watani: qadaya karrast laha hayati. General Egyptian Book Organisation, 2015.
- Safahat lam tunshar min sirat al-mufaker wal-siyasi wal-akadimi wal-istishari al-duktur Milad Hanna, Al-masry al-youm [Newspaper series], 18, 19 & 20 June 2018.
