= Amenhotep, son of Hapu =

Ancient Egyptian priest, scribe, and public official

Amenhotep
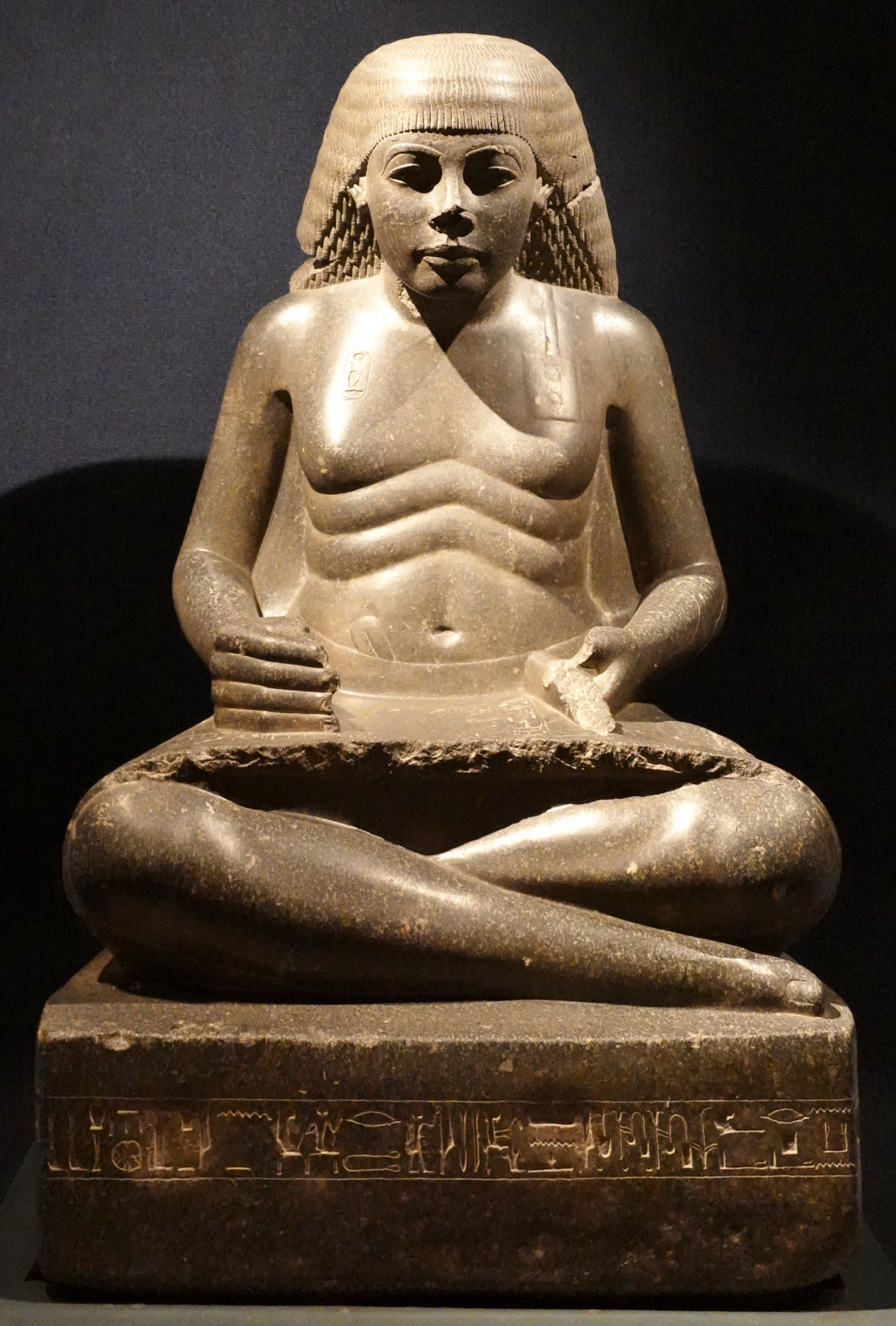
- Statue of Amenhotep
- Born: c. 1425 BC
- Died: c. 1357 BC (aged c. 68)
- Occupation: Polymath
- Parent(s): Hapu; Itu

Amenhotep (transcribed jmn-ḥtp zꜣ ḥꜣp.w; c. 1425 BC - c. 1357 BC) was an ancient Egyptian architect, priest, herald, scribe, and public official who held a number of offices under Amenhotep III of the 18th Dynasty.

He was posthumously deified as a god of healing.

== Life ==
He is said to have been born at the end of Thutmose III's reign, in the town of Athribis (modern Banha in the north of Cairo). His father was Hapu, and his mother Itu. Though little about Amenhotep's early life is known prior to his entering civil service, it is believed that he learned to read and write at the local library and scriptorium. He was a priest and a Scribe of Recruits (organizing the labour and supplying the manpower for the Pharaoh's projects, both civilian and military). He was also an architect and supervised several building projects, among them Amenhotep III's mortuary temple at western Thebes, of which only two statues remain nowadays, known as the Colossi of Memnon, and the creation of the quarry of El-Gabal el-Ahmar, nearby Heliopolis, from which the blocks used to create the Colossi were probably taken. Other plans, such as the portico of the Temple of Karnak, completed under Ramesses II, and those for the Luxor Temple are also attributed to Amenhotep. He may also have been the architect of the Temple of Soleb in Nubia. Amenhotep is noted to have participated in Amenhotep III's first Sed festival, in the 30th year of the king's rule. After this, he is believed to have retired from civil service and become the steward of Princess Sitamun's properties (similar to an asset manager today), and received honours such as the designation of Fan-bearer on the Right Side of the King, among other things. According to some reliefs in the tomb of Ramose, he may have died in the 31st year of Amenhotep III, which would correspond to either 1360 BC or 1357 BC, depending on the chronology used. His death has also been dated to the 35th year of the king.

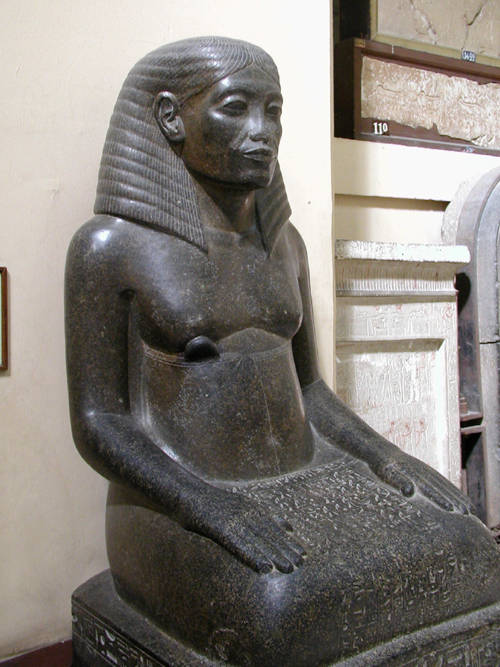
Amenhotep as an elderly man. Egyptian Museum, Cairo.

== Legacy ==
After his death, his reputation grew and he was revered for his teachings and as a philosopher. He was also revered as a healer and eventually worshipped as a god of healing, like his predecessor Imhotep (Amenhotep and Imhotep are among the few non-royal Egyptians who were deified after their death, and until the 21st century, they were thought to be only two commoners to achieve this status). There are several surviving statues of him as a scribe, portraying him as a young man and as an older man. He was a deified human and thus was depicted only in human form. His cult was initially limited to the Thebes area, with a funerary temple constructed to him during his lifetime next to that of Amenhotep III. This was clearly an exceptional privilege, as it was the only private cult temple to be built among the royal monuments in the area. He continued to be worshipped for at least three centuries after his death, and evidence of this worship persists in a 26th Dynasty votary inscription on a statue dedicated to Amenhotep by a daughter of the pharaoh. During the period of the Ptolemaic Kingdom, his worship saw a resurgence which led to chapels being dedicated to him in the Temple of Hathor at Deir el-Medina and the Mortuary Temple of Hatshepsut at Deir el-Bahari. Statues were erected to him in the Temple of Amun at Karnak and he was treated as an intermediary with the god Amun. Amenhotep also utilised his influence with the king to secure royal patronage for the town of Athribis, for the local god, and the temple dedicated to that god.

Manetho gives a legendary account of how Amenhotep advised a king named Amenophis, who was "desirous to become a spectator of the gods, as had Orus, one of his predecessors in that kingdom, desired the same before him". Manetho states that Amenophis was the son of a "Ramses" and the father of a "Sethos" (Seti) and was later named "Ramses" after the father of Amenophis. Amenophis is commonly identified with Akhenaten also known as Amenhotep IV, while "Orus" fits with the latter's father, Amenhotep III. Manetho relates that the wise man counseled that the king should "clear the whole country of the lepers and of the other impure people" and that the King then sent 80,000 lepers to the quarries. After this the wise man foresaw that the lepers would ally themselves with people coming to their help and subdue Egypt. He put the prophecy into letter to the King and then killed himself. Manetho associates this event with the Exodus of the Israelites from Egypt, but Josephus strongly rejects this interpretation.

=== Mortuary temple ===
Amenhotep was allowed to build his mortuary temple adjacent to that of the pharaoh. This honour is quite rare and indicates that Amenhotep was highly respected by the time of his death, despite the fact that he was a commoner and had only entered civil service at an advanced age, in his late forties. Excavated in 1934 or 1935, it measures 45 × 110 metres and is surrounded by three shrines. His first courtyard contained a 25 × 26 m water basin of considerable depth, fed by groundwater from the Nile River. 20 trees were planted in pits around the basin. The temple at the end of the courtyard was adorned with a pillared portico, and the temple was slightly elevated on a terrace.

An interesting find in Amenhotep's mortuary temple was a lengthy and detailed curse for anyone who disturbed and robbed the tomb. The curse read:

As for [anyone] who will come after me and who will find the foundation of the funerary tomb in destruction…
as for anyone who will take the personnel from among my people…
as for all others who will turn them astray…
I will not allow them to perform their scribal function…
I will put them in the furnace of the king…
His uraeus will vomit flame upon the top of their heads,
demolishing their flesh and devouring their bones.
They will become Apophis [a divine serpent who is vanquished] on the morning of the day of the year.
They will capsize in the sea which will devour their bodies.
They will not receive honors received by virtuous people.
They will not be able to swallow offerings of the dead.
One will not pour for them water in libation…
Their sons will not occupy their places, their women will be violated before their eyes.
Their great ones will be so lost in their houses that they will be upon the floor…
They will not understand the words of the king at the time when he is in joy.
They will be doomed to the knife on the day of massacre…
Their bodies will decay because they will starve and will not have sustenance and their bones will perish.

== See also ==
- List of Egyptian architects
- List of ancient Egyptian scribes
