= Joseph Hekekyan =

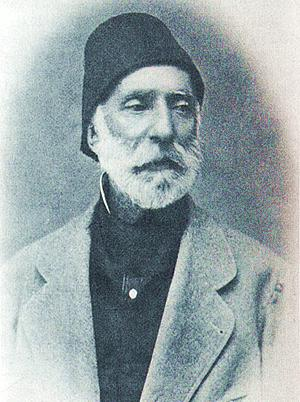
Portrait of Joseph Hekekyan

Joseph Hekekyan Bey (1807, Istanbul – 1875), was an Armenian administrator, archaeologist and civil engineer, who lived most of his life in Egypt.

== Early life and education ==
Joseph Hekekyan was born in 1807 in Constantinople and raised in an Armenian Catholic family. His father, Michirdiz H., was an interpreter for Mohamed Ali Pasha, and in 1817 was able to get him a state-sponsored scholarship to Stonyhurst College in Lancashire, England where he did various technical trades. There he studied English and Latin, after which he studied civil engineering and hydraulics. He also studied steam engines, machinery, hydraulics, surveying, and irrigation at Bramah's Engineering Factory in Pimlico as well as spinning and weaving techniques at some factories until being called back to Egypt in 1830. After returning to Egypt, Hekekyan became active in the educational and industrial reform. He was appointed Chief Overseer, trained students, traveled to the new Polytechnic engineering school in Bulaq, and contributed to the establishment of the Egyptian School in Paris.

== Early career ==
Between 1834 and 1837 he was the director of the Polytechnic School in Cairo. There, he became technical advisor for the government and then a member of Egypt's bureaucratic elite during Muhammad Ali's reign. This position mostly included being a translator in education and government foreign affairs, as well as having close relations with European consuls. With being involved in Europe so much, Hekekyan adopted the European stereotype and forgot his native Turkish culture. He started wearing gloves, stockings, and grew a large moustache. These changes led to him being called an "English infidel" by his Egyptian colleagues but an "exceptional Europeanized Oriental" by westerners. In 1836, Hekekyan co founded the Egyptian Society in Cairo which replaced the Institut d’Égypte. It was used as a meeting place for Europeans, particularly British, traveling through Egypt.

In the 1840s, he was tasked by the government with designing and building a number of model villages on the estates of the royal family which like the example of the village of Gezayye were arranged on a street grid by order of importance, starting with the owner's Manor house and diwan/duwwar overlooking the road, and then rows of “well to do” sheikhs and merchants’ houses, followed by rows of “middling fellahs’” houses, and then huts for a “low class” of fellahs. In between the Manor house and the other houses, was a row of commercial buildings; shops, a mosque, an inn, and a house of prostitution. Hekekyan imported the concept of model villages from Britain where he was educated, to Egypt, and it became widely established by the late nineteenth century. These model villages launched the paradigm of patronizing top-down housing for the masses known as 'izbas (hamlets). When Muhammad Ali's reign in Egypt ended, he was concerned for his family's safety as well as having problems from severe ophthalmia which led him to retire in 1850.

== Archaeology career ==
Hekekyan directed excavations at the ruins of Memphis in Mit Rahina, Giza in 1852 and 1854, financed by the Egyptian government. He additionally directed excavations at Heliopolis which took four years of excavation, and was abandoned in 1852. This excavation financed by the Royal Society of London and the Ottoman-Egyptian government of Abbas Pasha. The primary focus of these excavations were to measure the rise of the Nile river and its water table. Although this was the primary focus, Hekekyan was very ambitious and this led to him discovering parts of at least thirteen colossal statues and segments of in-situ buildings. He composed all of his findings and observations at these sites into letters, reports, sketches, and maps which he sent to his colleague Leonard Horner, the president of the Geological Society of London and a pioneer of the study of soil stratification. In these objects sent to Horner, Hekekyan included his daily observations, work progress, soil information, and water levels of the Nile river. Leonard Horner would then use Hekekyan's findings to analyze the annual increase Nile flood sediments. Even though Hekekyan's research got little support, his work for Horner was substantial. Leonard Horner eventually was able to predict that civilized humans had lived in Egypt for 13,371 years due to all of Hekekyan's findings.Their excavations were the first to use geological stratigraphy in Egypt or elsewhere. The idea of stratigraphy was entirely new to Egyptology, where it was used to date artefacts, historical records, and inscriptions from the past. In 1863, Hekekyan wrote a book titled A Treatise on the Chronology of Siriadic Monuments. His book introduced geo-astronomy and suggested that Ancient Egyptian monuments were built with measurements related to the movement of the star Sirius. Also in the book, Hekekyan adopted the French view that the Egyptians who built their ancient monuments were far more skilled than their modern descendants. Hekekyan's excavations were more geological than archaeological, but they were crucial for the history of Memphis and Heliopolis, and were without doubt the first "stratified" excavations carried out in Egypt thanks to Hekekyan's detailed journals and sketches. His methods can be compared to what is used in archaeology today in the UK and elsewhere.

== Writings ==
- Notes on the Eastern desert of Egypt, from Gebel Afret, by the ancient porphyry quarries of Gebel Khan, Near to the old station of Gebel Gir - with a brief account of the ruins at Gebel Khan - by Hekekyan bey - Journal of the Asiatic Society of Bengal, November 1848, pp 584–587
- A treatise on the chronology of siriardic monuments demonstrated that the Egyptian dynasties of Manetho are records of astrological Nile observations which have been continued to the present time, by Hekekyan Bey C.E. of Constantinople - formerly in the Egyptian service (for private circulation) London, printed by Taglar and Francis 1863, I vol, 160 pp
- Hekekyan, “Journals 1851 - 1854, Folio 355, British Library Add Ms. 37448-71.
- Joseph Hekekyan Bey, Collections. The British Museum.
