= List of bridges in Egypt =

This list of bridges in Egypt lists bridges of particular historical, scenic, architectural or engineering interest. Road and railway bridges, viaducts, aqueducts and footbridges are included.

== Historical and architectural interest bridges ==
Photo		Name	Arabic	Distinction	Length	Type	Carries Crosses	Opened	Location	Governorate	Ref.
	1	Roda Island Bridge				Pontoon bridge	Footbridge; Nile (short arm)		Cairo–Roda Island	Cairo	
	2	Mansoura Railway Bridge	جسر قطار المنصورة		279 m (915 ft)	Truss; Steel	Railway bridge Nile (Damietta branch)	1913	Mansoura–Talkha; 31°03′01.4″N 31°23′17.7″E	Dakahlia	
	3	Giza Zoo Suspension Bridge		Built by Eiffel et Cie company		Suspension	Footbridge; Giza Zoo	1915	Giza; 30°1′25.8″N 31°12′52.7″E	Giza	
	4	King Farouk Bridge		Montaza Palace		Arch; Concrete	Montazah Beach		Alexandria; 31°17′27″N 30°1′19.9″E	Alexandria	
	5	Imbaba Bridge	كوبري إمبابة		480 m (1,570 ft)	Truss; Steel	Railway bridge Road bridge Nile	1924	Cairo–Giza; 30°04′30.1″N 31°13′31.7″E	Cairo; Giza	
	6	Qasr El Nil Bridge	كوبري قصر النيل		382 m (1,253 ft)	Beam bridge Steel	Road bridge Nile	1933	Cairo–Zamalek–Giza; 30°2′37.5″N 31°13′47″E	Cairo; Giza	
	7	Stanley Bridge (Alexandria)	كوبري ستانلي		276 m (906 ft)	Box girder Prestressed concrete	El-Gaish Road; Stanley beach	2001	Alexandria; 31°14′6.2″N 29°56′54.9″E	Alexandria	

== Major road and railway bridges ==
This table presents the structures with spans greater than 100 metres (330 ft) (non-exhaustive list).

	Name FO	Arabic	Span	Length	Type	Carries Crosses	Opened	Location	Governorate	Ref.
1	Suez Canal Bridge	كوبري السلام	404 m (1,325 ft)	3,900 m (12,800 ft)	Cable-stayed; Steel box girder deck, concrete pylons 50+70+404+70+50	Road bridge Suez Canal	2001	El Qantara; 30°49′40.8″N 32°19′3.8″E	Ismailia	
2	El Ferdan Railway Bridge	كوبري الفردان	340 m (1,120 ft)	640 m (2,100 ft)	Cantilever; Steel; Swing bridge 150+340+150	Railway bridge Suez Canal	2001	El Qantara; 30°39′25.6″N 32°20′2″E	Ismailia	
3	New El Ferdan Railway Bridge		340 m (1,120 ft)	640 m (2,100 ft)	Cantilever; Steel; Swing bridge 150+340+150	Railway bridge Suez Canal	2020	El Qantara; 30°39′19.4″N 32°20′41.3″E	Ismailia	
4	Rod El Farag Axis Bridge	كوبري تحيا مصر	300 m (980 ft)	540 m (1,770 ft)	Cable-stayed; Composite steel/concrete deck, concrete pylons 3x40+300+3x40	Road bridge Nile	2019	Cairo–Warraq Island–Giza; 30°06′08.4″N 31°14′14.0″E	Cairo; Giza	(Note: The length given only takes into account the main bridge, central span(s) and shore span(s), approach viaducts are not counted.) (Note: With a width of 67.3 meters, the bridge holds the Guinness World Record for the world's widest cable-stayed bridge (May 2019).)
5	Aswan Bridge	كوبري أسوان	250 m (820 ft)	977 m (3,205 ft)	Cable-stayed; Concrete box girder deck, concrete pylons 49+76+250+76+49	Nile	2002	Aswan; 24°11′38.7″N 32°51′58.6″E	Aswan	
6	Al Moneeb Bridge		150 m (490 ft)(x2)	470 m (1,540 ft)	Box girder Prestressed concrete 85+2x150+85	Cairo Ring Road; Nile		Cairo–Dahab Island–Giza; 29°59′21.1″N 31°13′34.2″E	Cairo; Giza	
7	Dahshour Bridge	كوبرى جنوب دهشور	134 m (440 ft)	1,300 m (4,300 ft)	Box girder Prestressed concrete 76+2x134+76	Regional Ring Road; Nile	2013	Al Bilaydah–Ghammazah Al Kubra; 29°41′22.4″N 31°17′09.6″E	Giza	
8	Rod El-Farag Bridge	كوبري روض الفرج	130 m (430 ft)	500 m (1,600 ft)	Box girder Prestressed concrete 75+130+75	Road bridge Nile		Cairo–Giza; 30°05′08.8″N 31°13′46.5″E	Cairo; Giza	
9	Gerga Axis Bridge	محور جرجا دار السلام	130 m (430 ft)(x2)		Box girder Prestressed concrete	Road bridge Nile	2017	Girga; 26°21′54.0″N 31°53′05.3″E	Sohag	
10	El Warrak Bridge	كوبرى الوراق	120 m (390 ft)(x4)	2,260 m (7,410 ft)	Box girder Prestressed concrete	Cairo Ring Road; Nile	2001	Cairo–Warraq Island–Giza; 30°07′58.9″N 31°12′13.3″E	Qalyubiyya; Giza	
11	Banha Bridge	كوبرى بنها العلوى	120 m (390 ft)	1,300 m (4,300 ft)	Box girder Prestressed concrete	Alexandria Agriculture Road; Nile (Damietta branch)		Benha; 30°29′01.0″N 31°10′47.7″E	Qalyubiyya	
12	15th May Bridge	كوبري 15 مايو	115 m (377 ft)		Box girder Prestressed concrete	Road bridge Nile	1986	Cairo–Zamalek–Giza; 30°03′28.2″N 31°13′36.9″E	Cairo; Giza	
13	6th October Bridge	جسر 6 أكتوبر	110 m (360 ft)	12,500 m (41,000 ft)	Box girder Prestressed concrete 100+110+100	Road bridge Nile	1996	Cairo–Zamalek–Giza; 30°2′57.3″N 31°13′46.2″E	Cairo; Giza	
14	El Giza Bridge	كوبري عباس	104 m (341 ft)	471 m (1,545 ft)	Box girder Prestressed concrete 69+104+70	Road bridge Nile	1971	Cairo–Roda Island–Giza; 30°00′57.1″N 31°13′12.5″E	Cairo; Giza	
15	Tama Axis Upper Bridge	جسر محور طما العلوي			Box girder Prestressed concrete	Road bridge Nile	2018	Tima; 26°53′33.5″N 31°29′02.1″E	Sohag; Asyut	
16	New Banha Bridge				Box girder Prestressed concrete	Regional Ring Road; Nile (Damietta branch)		Benha; 30°29′36.3″N 31°11′27.7″E	Qalyubiyya	
17	El Gama'a Bridge	كوبري الجامعه			Beam bridge Steel	Road bridge Nile		Cairo–Roda Island–Giza; 30°1′42.5″N 31°13′14.4″E	Cairo; Giza	(Note: Also called Cairo University Bridge.)
18	Talkha Axis Nile Bridge			630 m (2,070 ft)	Box girder Prestressed concrete	Road bridge Nile (Damietta branch)	2016	Mansoura–Talkha; 31°05′39.3″N 31°25′20.8″E	Dakahlia	
19	Kalabsha Bridge	جسر كلابشة			Box girder Prestressed concrete	Road bridge Nile		Kom Ombo; 24°35′01.1″N 32°54′16.7″E	Aswan	
20	Sayyida Aisha Bridge	كوبري السيدة عائشة			Box girder Prestressed concrete	Road bridge	1979–2026	Cairo; 30.023455°N 31.256170°E	Cairo	

== See also ==
- Transport in Egypt
- Rail transport in Egypt
- Geography of Egypt
- List of rivers of Egypt
- de:Liste der Nilbrücken (in German) - List of bridges over the Nile River

== Notes and references ==
- Notes
- Nicolas Janberg. "International Database for Civil and Structural Engineering". Structurae.com.
- Others references
