= El Warraq =

Municipal district of Giza, Egypt

El Warraq الوراق
- Neighborhood
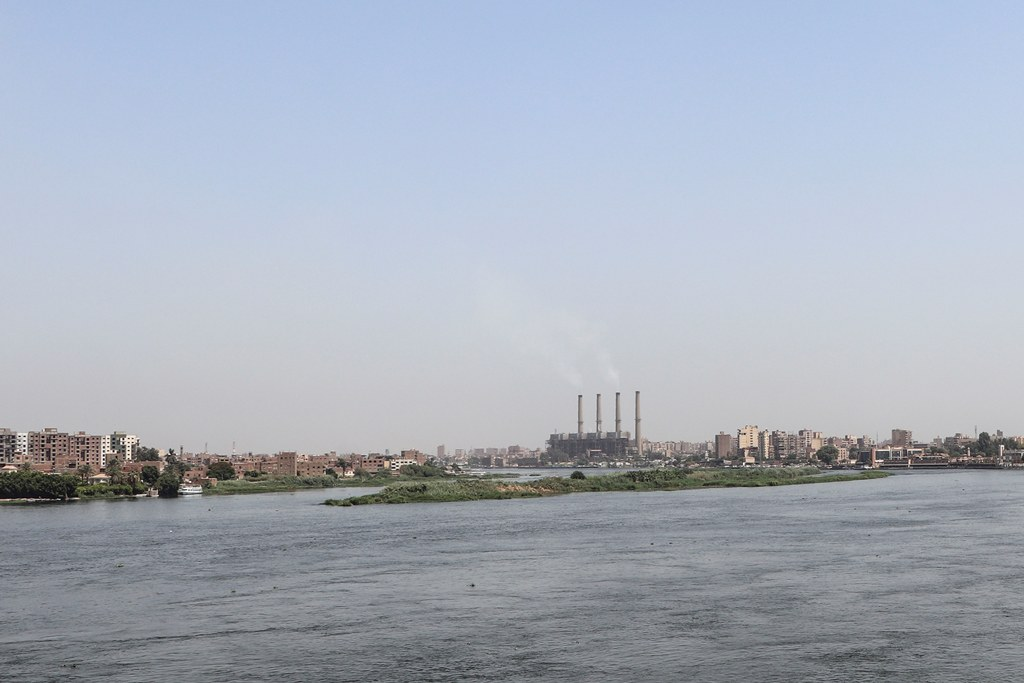
- Southern tip of Warraq Island

- Location in Egypt
- Coordinates: 30°7′5″N 31°11′3″E
- Country: Egypt
- Governorate: Giza Governorate

Population
  - Total: 800,000
- approximately
- Time zone: UTC+2 (EET)
  - Summer (DST): UTC+3 (EEST)

Al Warraq (Arabic: الوراق) is a municipal district of the Giza city in Egypt, consisting of both mainland and Warraq Island in the River Nile.

The district is located on the site of an ancient city Kerkasoros (Ancient Greek: Κερκασωρος, Latin: Cercasorum), which hosted the observatory Eudoxus of Cnidus worked at. In 2023 it had a population of 800,000.

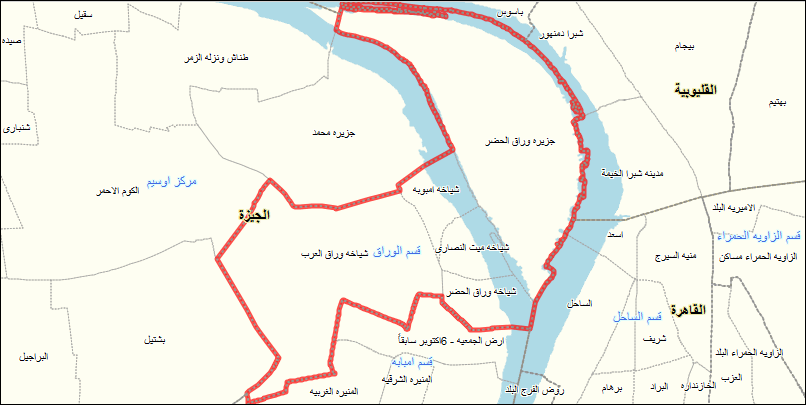
Al-Warraq map in Giza

== Districts ==
This new district includes the areas of Waraq al-Arab, Waraq al-Hadar, and Warraq Island. Al-Warraq is located on the Corniche of the Nile River, bordered by the Ring Road and the Warraq Bridge to the west, the Nile River to the north, the Coast Bridge to the east, and the district of Imbaba to the south.

The construction of the Ring Road brought significant urban development to Al-Warraq, connecting it to the agricultural road, the desert road, the Mehwar (Axis), and the neighborhoods of Heliopolis, Al-Haram, and Maadi. Al-Warraq has two entrances to the Ring Road: one via the Corniche from Warraq Bridge and another from Al-Qawmeya Al-Arabiya. There is also an access point from the Coast Bridge. Al-Warraq is located relatively close to Tahrir Square and Ramses Square.

The district is served by four main bus stations: Waraq al-Arab, Waraq al-Hadar, Al-Qawmeya Al-Arabiya, and Geziret Mohamed. These stations support more than twenty bus lines that connect Al-Warraq with various neighborhoods such as Giza, Al-Haram, Tahrir, Attaba, Nasr City, Abbassia, Al-Duweiqa, Imam Al-Laithi, Sayeda Aisha, Amr ibn al-As Mosque, and Al-Darrasa.

Bus lines serving Al-Warraq include:

- Line 111: Amr Mosque – Al-Warraq
- Line 933: Al-Warraq – Faisal – Al-Haram
- Line 609: Al-Warraq – Citadel
- Line 708: Al-Warraq – District 8
- Line 14: Al-Warraq – Omrania
- Line 86: Waraq al-Arab – Tahrir – Sayeda Aisha
- Line 989: Waraq al-Arab – Omrania
- Line 112: Sakil – Geziret Mohamed – Al-Warraq – Al-Monib
- Line 202: Geziret Mohamed – Al-Warraq – Attaba
- Line 981: Geziret Mohamed – Al-Warraq – Al-Haram
- Line 175: Waraq al-Arab – Attaba – Abbassia
- Line 954: Al-Qawmeya – Agouza – Ramses – Abbassia – Al-Azhar University
- Line 250: Al-Qawmeya – Shubra – Al-Bu'outh
- Line 196: Al-Qawmeya – University – Al-Matba'a

Mini-bus lines include:

- Line 10: Al-Warraq – Shubra – Al-Darrasa
- Line 101: Waraq al-Arab – Zamalek – Ramses – Abbassia
- Line 73: Al-Qawmeya – Zamalek – Ahmed Helmy

Microbus lines include:

- Al-Warraq – Attaba
- Al-Warraq – Tahrir
- Al-Warraq – Giza
- Al-Warraq – Ramses
- Al-Warraq – Shubra El-Kheima
- Al-Warraq – Awsim
- Al-Warraq – Manshiyat al-Qanater
- Al-Warraq – Al-Souk (Market)
- Cinema Al-Warraq – Ramses
- Cinema Al-Warraq – El-Sahel
- Cinema Al-Warraq – Imbaba
- Al-Azhar Institute – Al-Oruba Street – Al-Qawmeya – Imbaba
- Street 10 – Traffic Department
- Warraq Central – Madinat Al-Omal (Workers’ City)

There are more than ten churches in the district, including:

- The Apostolic Church in Al-Warraq
- Church of the Virgin Mary and Archangel Michael
- Church of Saint Mina the Great Martyr in Warraq Central
- The Historic Church of the Virgin Mary in Al-Warraq
- Church of St. George on Street 10

== Major Landmarks ==
Among the most notable landmarks in Al-Warraq is the Theodor Bilharz Research Institute, also known as the "Research Institute," a prominent medical facility—the only one of its kind in Egypt and the Middle East. It receives patients from all Egyptian governorates and specializes in combating liver diseases such as bilharzia and viral hepatitis. The institute employs elite researchers, including doctors, biologists, pharmacists, and chemists. It includes departments for liver diseases, endoscopy, urology surgery, intensive care, radiology, and outpatient clinics. The German government contributed to its equipment. The laboratories and outpatient clinics were inaugurated in 1976, and the hospital fully opened in 1983.

Al-Warraq also features the new Al-Warraq Central Hospital. The outpatient clinic was inaugurated in a ceremony attended by the Governor and the Minister of Health. It cost 4.5 million Egyptian pounds. The district includes several health units, such as the Advanced Health Unit in Waraq al-Hadar (recently equipped with advanced radiology and a complete dental unit), the Health Unit in Waraq al-Arab (equipped with a sonar device), the Health Unit on Warraq Island, and the one in Geziret Mohamed. The district is also home to the Environmental Research Center under the Ministry of Health, the Waraq al-Hadar Comprehensive Medical Center, and dozens of clinics and private hospitals like Al-Nile Specialist Hospital, Al-Rahma Hospital, Al-Fayrouz Hospital, Al-Hekma Hospital, Tabarak Children’s Hospital, Dr. Moqbel Maternity Hospital, Malik Al-Salam Surgical Hospital, Al-Noor Al-Mohammadi Hospital, and Abu Nabil Surgical Hospital.

Just 2 km from Al-Warraq are other major medical institutions such as Imbaba Fever Hospital, Tahrir General Hospital, Imbaba General Hospital, the National Heart Institute, the Hearing and Speech Institute, Imbaba Eye Hospital, the Institute of Chest and Allergy Research, and the Institute of Neurology and Motor Disorders. Al-Warraq also has branches of Egypt’s top diagnostic labs such as Al-Borg and Saridar, and more than 100 pharmacies.

Other key landmarks include the Ministry of Irrigation and Water Resources and the Egyptian Natural Gas Company (GASCO), which supplies gas to Cairo and Giza. All homes in Al-Warraq have been connected to natural gas. Also located in Al-Warraq is the massive Al-Warraq Water Plant, which produces 1.2 million cubic meters of water per day, supplying all of Giza up to Remaya Square in the south and Awsim in the north. Water network renovations are ongoing throughout Al-Warraq.

The district houses the headquarters of the Holding Company for Water and Wastewater in Giza and a major sewage treatment plant, part of a modern sewage network built in 1990 under the supervision of American experts, serving all northern Giza regions. Recently, the Minister of Transport inaugurated the Tannash land port in Al-Warraq, used for transporting goods between Cairo and Alexandria.

The industrial area of Tannash in Al-Warraq hosts several major factories, including Nasr Castings Factory, Barzi Factory, Mostafa Ali Factory, Olympic Factory, Nasr Pipes Company, Karnak Tile Factory, and Trex Paints Factory, as well as the former Chair Factory.

Al-Warraq has a police station, a public high school, and an experimental language school (Al-Olaya School), ten primary schools, five preparatory schools, and several under construction, including Nour Al-Maaref Primary School near Marjan School, Al-Shorouk Secondary School, and Al-Sadat Primary School near the Sidi Abdel Aziz School Complex. There are also many private schools, such as Al-Nagah, Al-Wasimi, Al-Madaen, Al-Orman, Tannash Basic Education School (primary and preparatory), Old Tannash Primary School, Nabaa Al-Ilm School, Tafawoq School, Marjan School, Al-Hammadi School, Al-Imran School, Al-Sharif School, Al-Haddad School, Al-Hoda School, Al-Haramayn School, Al-Noor Al-Islamic School, Tabarak School, and Al-Adwaa School.

Many schools in Al-Warraq have recently been developed as part of a "100 Schools Development Project." Al-Warraq is also home to several Al-Azhar institutes, such as the Sayyed Mekkawy Institute, Geziret Mohamed Institute, Waraq al-Arab Azhar Institute, and the Othman Ma'an Institute. The district also has international schools, including the French school "École Terre Verte" and the English school "Nile Kangaroo School," as well as a hospitality and computing school, the Orman Hotel and Computer School.

Al-Warraq has more than 100 mosques and prayer halls. Historically, it is said that the origin of the Waraq al-Arab neighborhood traces back to a group of the Prophet Muhammad’s companions who came to Egypt in 21 AH (circa 642 CE) with Amr ibn al-As. Some of them settled in the area due to its fertile land on the Nile’s bank, leading to the numerous religious shrines in Waraq al-Arab.

Al-Warraq takes pride in being the birthplace of Sheikh Muhammad Abu al-Fadl al-Gizawi, who served as Grand Imam of Al-Azhar from 1917 to 1927.

== Warraq Island ==
=== Geography ===
Warraq Island is an island of area 756 hectares (1,870 acres), located in the Giza Governorate. About 3% of the area is government owned.

=== Population ===
In 2017, the population of Warraq Island was about 90000 to 100000.

=== 2017 Warraq Island protests ===
According to Yahia el-Mahgraby, who was head of the local council of Warraq Island for 17 years, conflict between Warraq islanders and Egyptian national authorities date back to 1998 during the Atef Ebeid prime ministership, when Ebeid issued a decree declaring Warraq and other Nile islands as nature reserves, and in 2001 issued decree 542 declaring Warraq and another island, Dahab, to be expropriated for public use. Ebeid's cabinet claimed that Warraq and Dahab did not exist prior to the construction of the Aswan Dam. The islanders protested against the 2001 decree and took legal action against the government, winning their case in 2002.

In May 2017, Egyptian president Abdel Fattah el-Sisi announced a campaign for the state to recover state-owned land that was illegally occupied. In July, a rumour circulated that residents' houses on Warraq Island would be demolished and replaced by investment projects. Member of Parliament (MP) for Warraq Island Ahmed Youssef stated that 700 "enroachments" and 160 squatted homes were to be removed. Another Warraq Island MP, Mahmoud el-Saeedy, stated that insufficient communication between residents and security forces occurred. On 16 July 2017, security forces and construction equipment appeared on Warraq Island. Security forces and residents fought, with the death of a 23-year old, 24 injuries and 9 arrests. Warraq Island resident Mohamed Arafa stated that during the conflict on 16 July, "furnished houses were demolished and some residents were kicked out of their homes.

During the 16 July demolition, resident Heba Nagaa Otmorsi's house was demolished without warning while she was at work on the mainland. The demolition crews and security forces arrived early in the morning when "most families" were asleep. As a result of the protests by the islanders, only 9 buildings were demolished.

The Guardian reported on a 2010 plan to transform Warraq Island into "'Horus Island', complete with glossy towers, wide boulevards and a marina" and a 2013 proposal that included "a glass skyscraper, a glistening glass pyramid, and manicured riverside walkways" for restructuring the island. The plans retained in 2017 included the construction of a bridge, which The Guardian suggested was the first step in a similar plan for a major transformation of the whole island.

Warraq Island residents continued to protest during the week following the demolition.

== See also ==
- 2019 Egyptian protests
