= Imbaba Bridge =

Bridge over the Nile, in Egypt

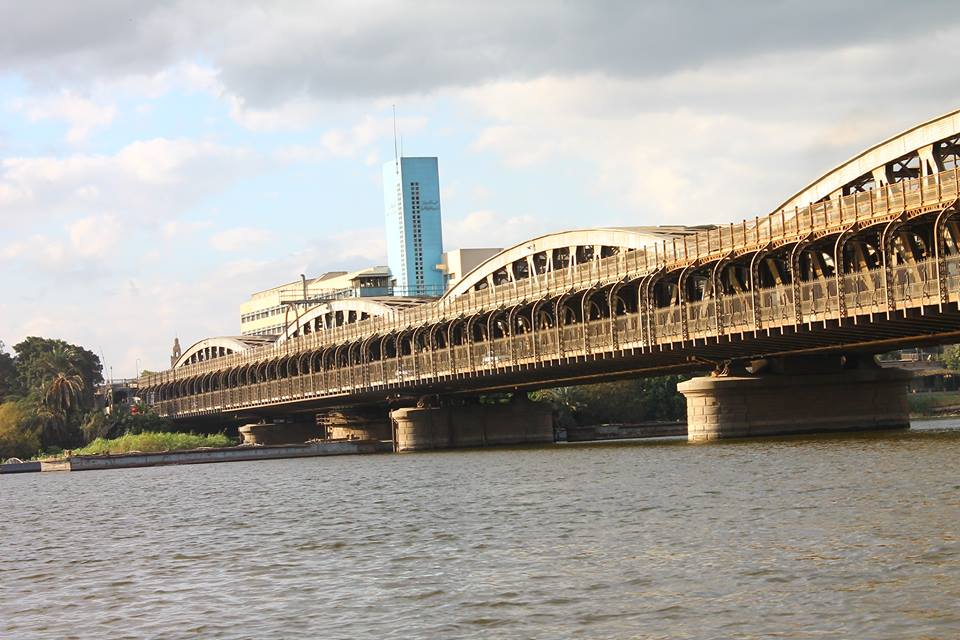
- Side view of the Imbaba Bridge
- Coordinates: 30°04′30″N 31°13′32″E
- Crosses: Nile
- Owner: Giza Governorate

Characteristics
- Material: Steel
- Total length: 495 m (1624.19 ft)

History
- Designer: David Tremblay
- Constructed by: Baume-Marpent
- Construction start: 1889
- Construction end: 1892
- Rebuilt: 1924

Location
- Interactive map of Imbaba Bridge

The Imbaba Bridge is a railway bridge located in Cairo, Egypt across the Nile River, about 935 kilometres (581 mi) downstream from the Aswan Dam. It was designed by the French engineer David Tremblay. The bridge was officially opened on May 15, 1892, by Khedive Abbas Hilmi II in a special ceremony. It is the only railway bridge across the Nile in Giza.

The bridge witnessed two versions, similar to the Qasr al-Nil bridge. The older construction was completed in 1892, measuring roughly 495 meters in length, and designed to allow railways to cross the Nile River heading westwards to the Giza Train station.

== Overview ==
At that time, it was 495 meters long. It was later modified, and part of it was moved to Damietta, where it is now known as the Damietta Bridge.

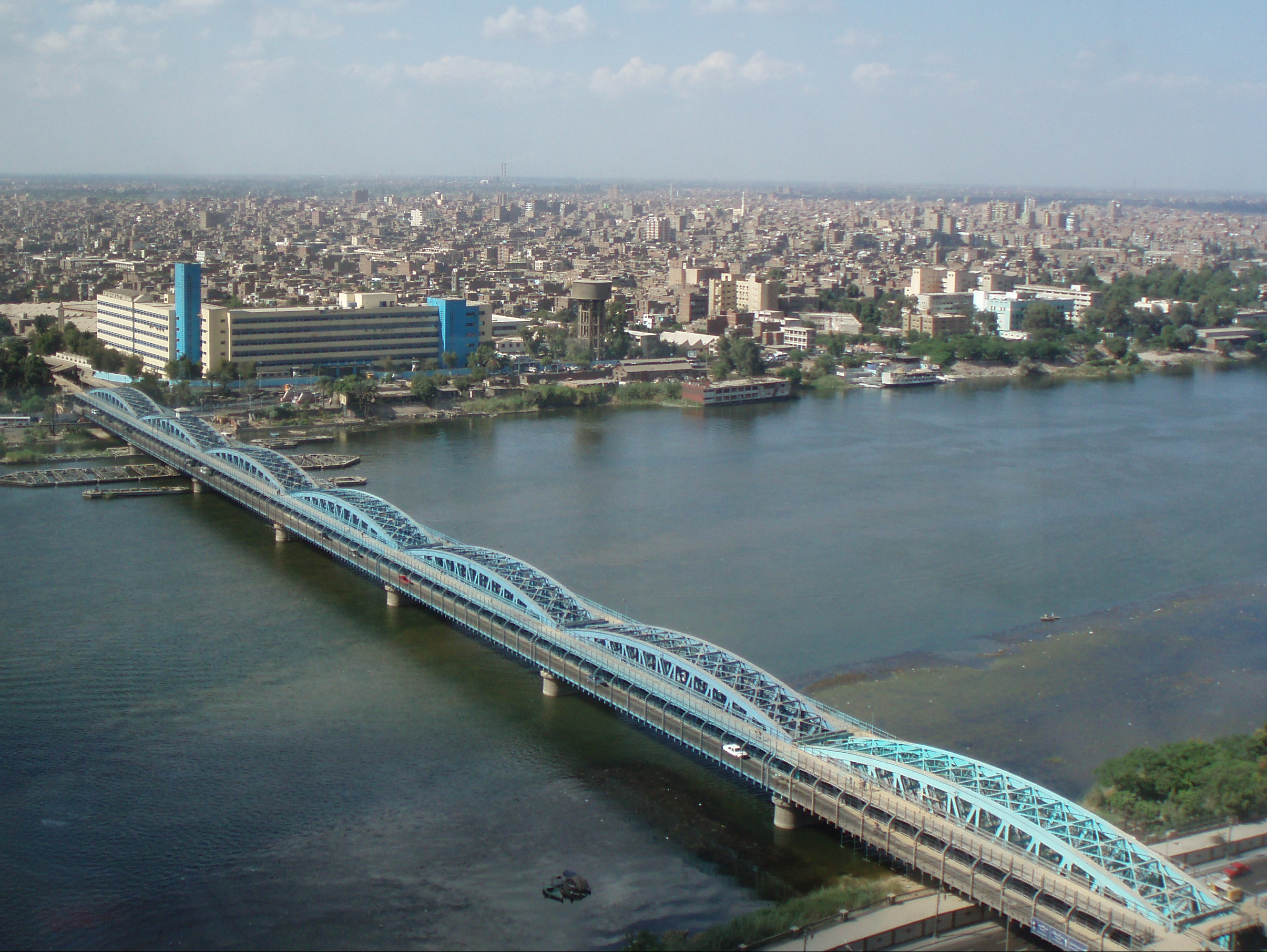
Aerial view of the Imbaba Bridge

While the old bridge was still in use, the new Imbaba Bridge, the current version was built between 1912 and 1924 by the Belgian firm Baume-Marpent. The first iteration was constructed in 1892 to let trains cross the Nile west to the Giza Train Station.

== See also ==
- List of bridges
- List of bridges in Egypt
