= Qorsaya Island =

Island in Egypt

Native name: جزيرة القرصاي
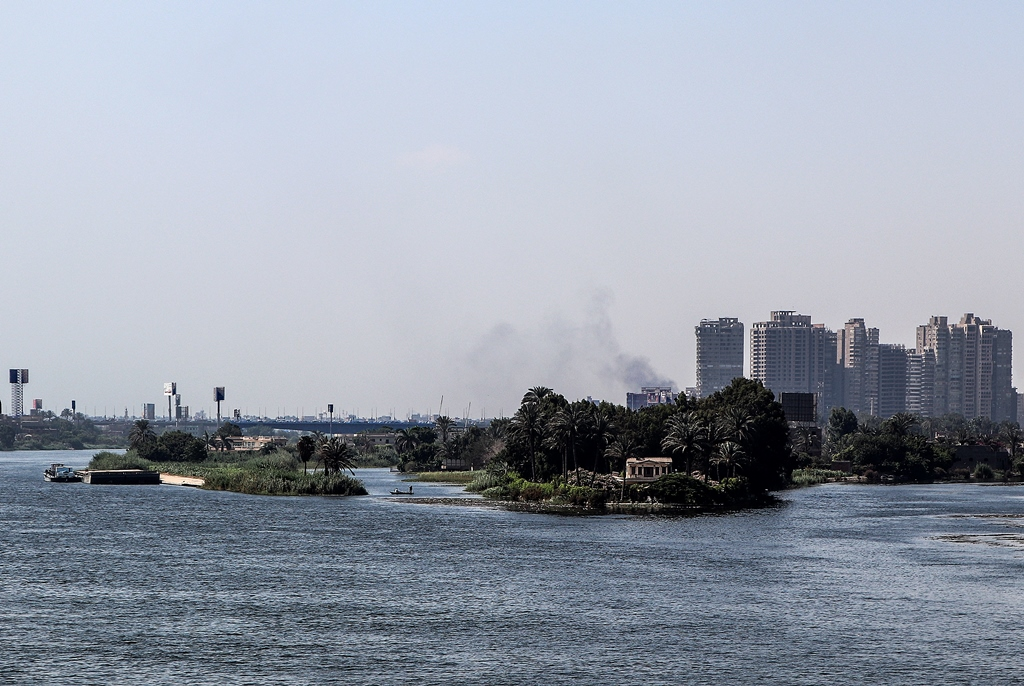
- Northern part of Qorsaya Island with al-Munib bridge in the background

- Location in Egypt

Geography
- Location: Nile River
- Coordinates: 30.002°N 31.219°E
- Adjacent to: Nile
- Length: 1,850 m (6070 ft)

Administration
- Egypt

Qorsaya Island (or el-Qursaya, Kursaya, Arabic: جزيرة القرصاية, Ǧazīrat al-Qurṣāya) is a Nile island located in the metropolitan region of Cairo near the western Nile shore south of Roda Island and near of Dahab Island. The island belongs to Giza and has a strong agricultural character.

== Geography and population ==
The 1,850-metre-long (1.15 mi) Qorsaya Island is inhabited by roughly 1,000 fishermen and 4,000 farmers. The northern half of the island is a mixture of small dwellings and agricultural land and the southern half of the island forms the main residential area. Numbers of villas are currently under construction on the northernmost tip. The island is accessed by hand-operated ferry from Giza.

There is an open conflict between the island residents and the Cairo-development plan of the Egyptian government.
