= Institute of Aviation Engineering and Technology =

Private university in Giza, Egypt

Coordinates: 30.0700°N 31.1887°E

- كلية هندسة وتكنولوجيا الطيران
- Established: 1997; 29 years ago
- Dean: Prof. Abdelkader Abdel Karim Ibrahim
- Faculty: 98
- Students: 2000
- Location: Giza, Giza, Egypt
- Website: http://www.iaet-eg.org/wp

Faculty of Aviation Engineering and Technology (Arabic:كلية هندسة وتكنولوجيا الطيران) is an Engineering Faculty in Giza, Egypt. It is a Faculty under to the Ministry Of Civil Aviation in Egypt & Ministry Of Higher Education under the academic supervision of Faculty of Engineering, Cairo University .
