= Amr Abou El Seoud =

Amr Ali Abdallah Abou El Seoud (born 6 November 1968) is the current CEO of Dar Capital (UK) Ltd, a London-based investment bank regulated by the Financial Services Authority and owned by the Kuwaiti shareholding company Investment Dar.

== Early life ==
Born in Giza, Egypt, the youngest son, his father's last post was first undersecretary for the Ministry of Public Works and Water Resources and his mother was a diplomat with the Ministry of Foreign affairs in Egypt. He spent his childhood growing up in different countries due to his parents' working requirements. He was educated and lived in Uganda, Kuwait, the United States, the Netherlands, Egypt and the United Kingdom. As a child he enjoyed playing football and fencing.

== Career ==
He started his career working for US Aid in Cairo as an accountant. After six months, he decided to travel around Europe.

Following his travels, Abou El Seoud returned to Egypt to start his career in accounting. He graduated from Cairo University in 1991 with a Bachelor in Commerce and Accounting. He worked for a year as an accountant at Coopers & Lybrand, Egypt (now PriceWaterhouseCoopers). During this period he met his wife, Soha.

In 1994, Abou El Seoud moved to Ernst & Young in Kuwait as an auditor.

In 1996, he was recruited by Investment Dar KSC as an Internal Auditor then received several promotions until he reached Senior Executive Vice President. This is the position which Abou El Seoud actively held until 2009.

In 1998, Abou El Seoud qualified as a Certified Public Accountant in San Diego, California.

He moved to London in 2008 when he was appointed to his current role as CEO of Dar Capital (UK) Ltd, a Sharia compliant investment banking subsidiary of Investment Dar based in London. As Dar Capital's CEO, Abou El Seoud is responsible for the overall management of the company including all capital market deals, landmark projects and growth strategy.

He also sits on the board of several companies including Grosvenor House Apartments (director), Aston Martin Holdings (UK) Ltd (director), Aston Martin Lagonda group (board member, member of Remuneration Committee, Finance Committee and Audit Committee), Lagonda Properties Ltd (board member), Aston Martin Lagonda Ltd (board member), Aston Martin Investments Ltd (board member), Investment Dar UK Ltd (CEO), Dar International Investment Bank (chairman), Al Dar Asset Management Company (director), CRC UAE (chairman) and Dar Capital UK Ltd (CEO and board member).

Abou El Seoud's previous board memberships include: Bahrain Islamic Bank, Manzel Holding Co K.S.C.C., and Credit Rating & Collection Company. He was also operating as assistant general manager and finance manager for Al Madar Financing and Leasing Company KSC in the process of company's operational restructuring and setting up the performance standard.

During his time in the UK, he has played a pivotal role in many of the Investment Dar landmark acquisitions including Grosvenor House Apartments in 2006 and Aston Martin Lagonda in 2007, the first ever sharia compliant leverage buyout.

== Personal life ==
Abou El Seoud lives in Abu Dhabi with his wife and two children.

== See also ==
- Investment Dar
