= Tanash =

Coordinates: 30°07′31″N 31°11′33″E

Tannash and Nazlat al-Zomor طناش ونزلة الزمر
- Location in Egypt
- Country: Egypt
- Governorate: Giza
- District: Awsim
- Established: 1900
- Time zone: UTC+2 (EET)
  - Summer (DST): UTC+3 (EEST)
- Postal code: 12981

Tanash W Nazlat al-Zomor (Arabic: طناش ونزلة الزمر), also known as the village of Tannash, is a village located in the Awsim district in Giza Governorate, Egypt. It is bordered to the south by Geziret Mohamed, to the north by Saqil, to the east by the Nile River, and to the west by El-Kom El-Ahmar.

== History ==
According to the "Geographical Dictionary of Egyptian Lands":

It is one of the ancient localities. It appeared in the records of Al-As'ad ibn Mamati and in *Tuhfat al-Irshad* under the name "Gezirat Tannash" as part of the Giza region. In *Tuhfa*, it was also mentioned as "Maniyat Tannash." In 1228 AH, the name appeared in its current form. In 1276 AH, a separate locality was recorded as "Nazlat Hassanain al-Zomor." In the 1900 cadastral revision of the Giza Governorate, the two areas were unified again under the name "Tannash and Nazlat al-Zomor" due to shared housing, administration, and land. The village has been proposed for elevation to a town due to its urban infrastructure.

== Landmarks ==
- El Nasr Castings (ENC) (Arabic: شركة النصر للمسبوكات): A major producer of ductile iron pipes in Egypt and the Middle East.
- Olympic Electric Factory: A major manufacturer of electrical appliances.
- Mostafa Ali Modern Lighting Factory.
- Chipsy Factory: A production plant for snack foods in Egypt.
- Tannash Basic Education School: The primary and preparatory school in the village. Another institution is known as "Old Tannash Primary School".
- Tannash Health Unit: The only healthcare provider in the village.
- Tannash Post Office.
- Tannash Youth Center.
- Al-Bahri Mosque: One of the oldest and tallest minaret mosques in the region.
- Shar'ia Association in Tannash: A major Islamic charitable organization.
- B.TECH Distribution Warehouse.
