= Giza =

City in Greater Cairo, Egypt

Giza الجيزة
- City
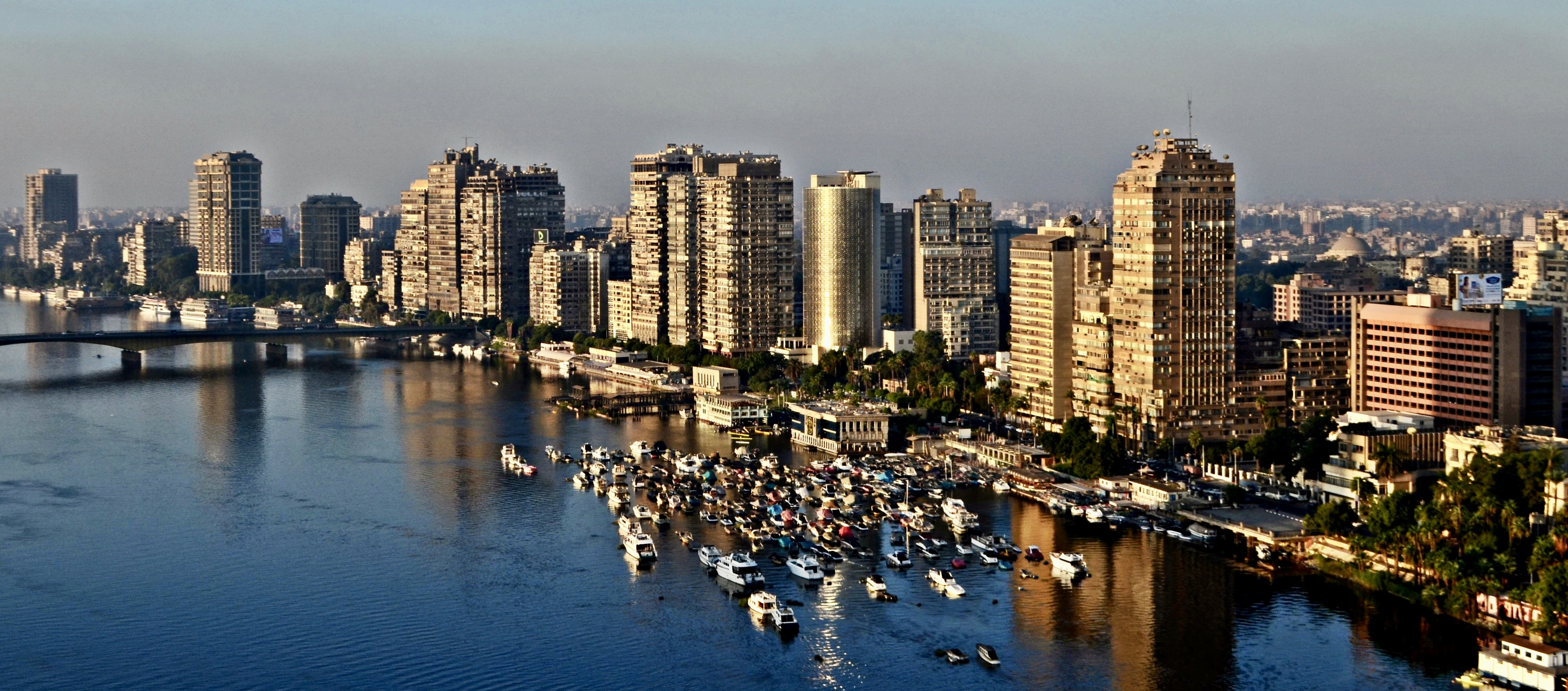
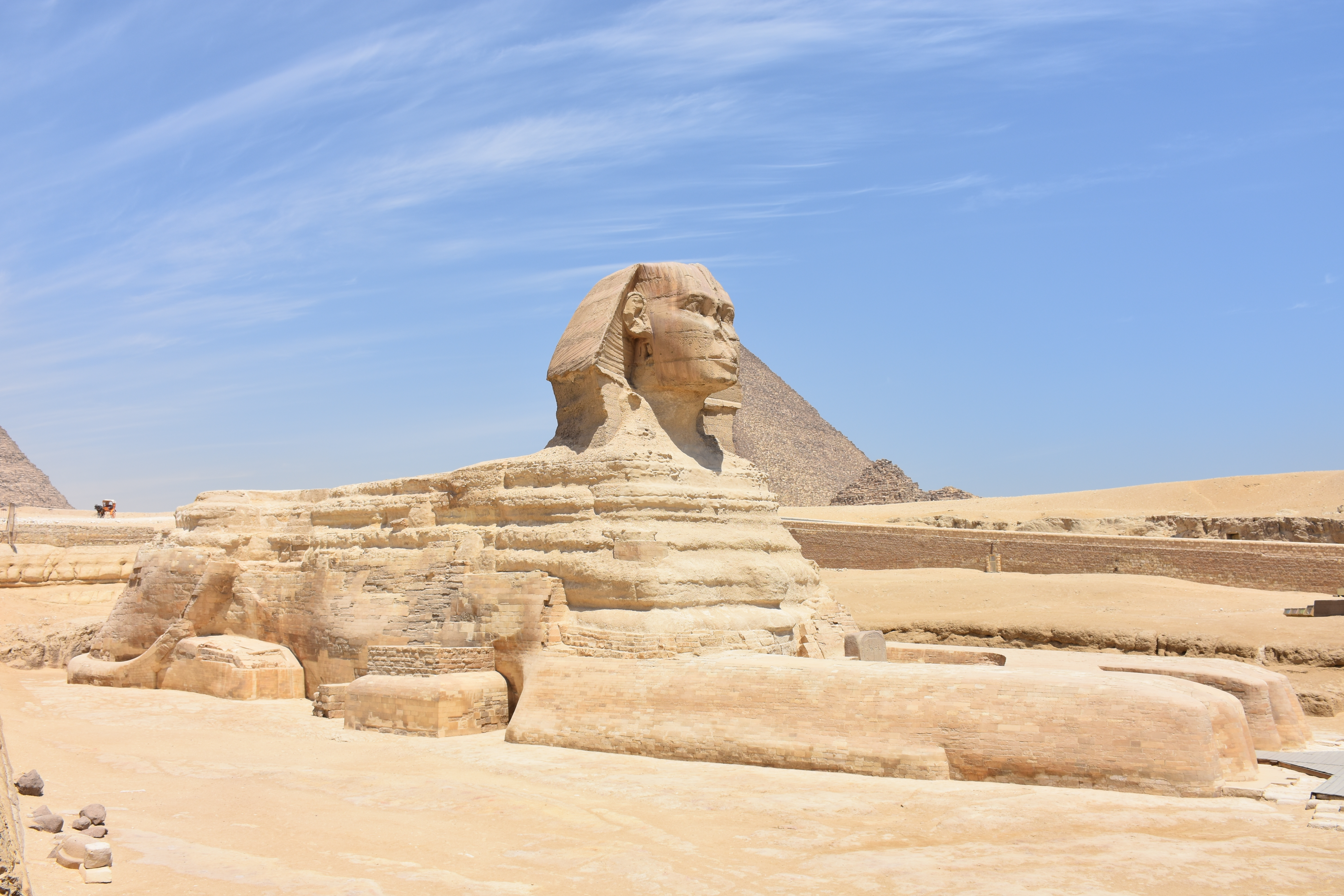
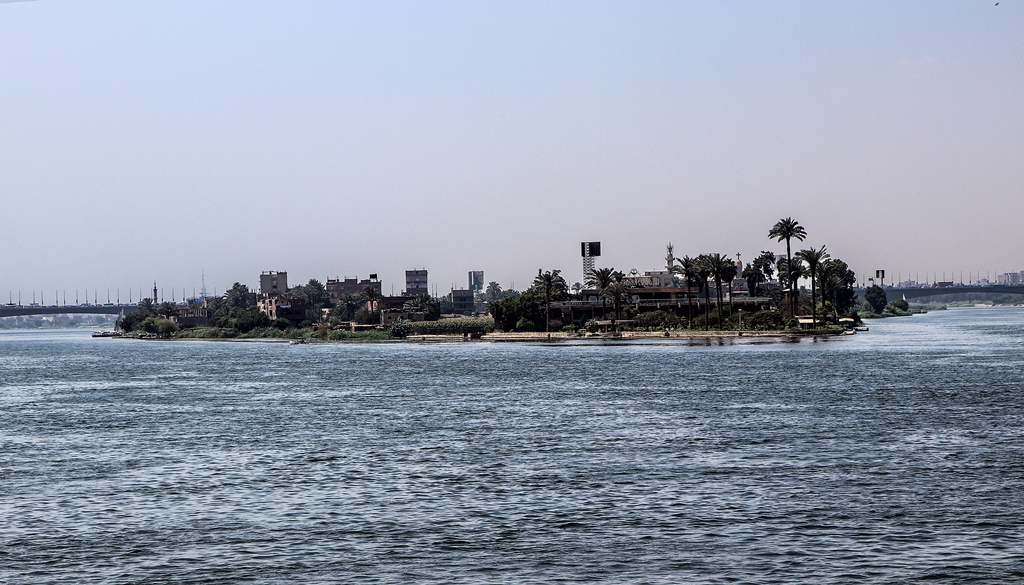
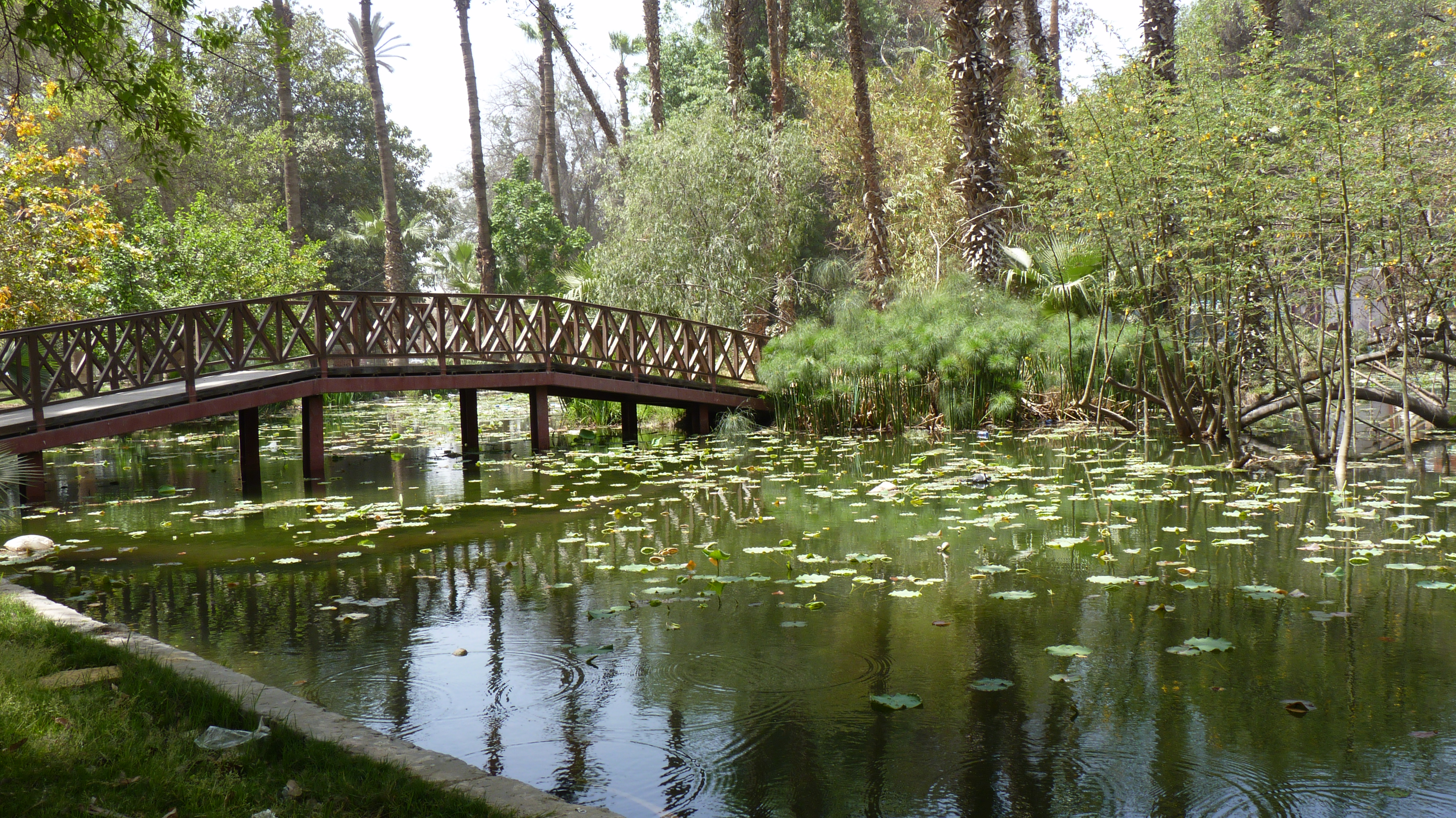
- Giza water front Grand Egyptian Museum Great Sphinx of Giza Dahab Island Orman Garden Giza Pyramids

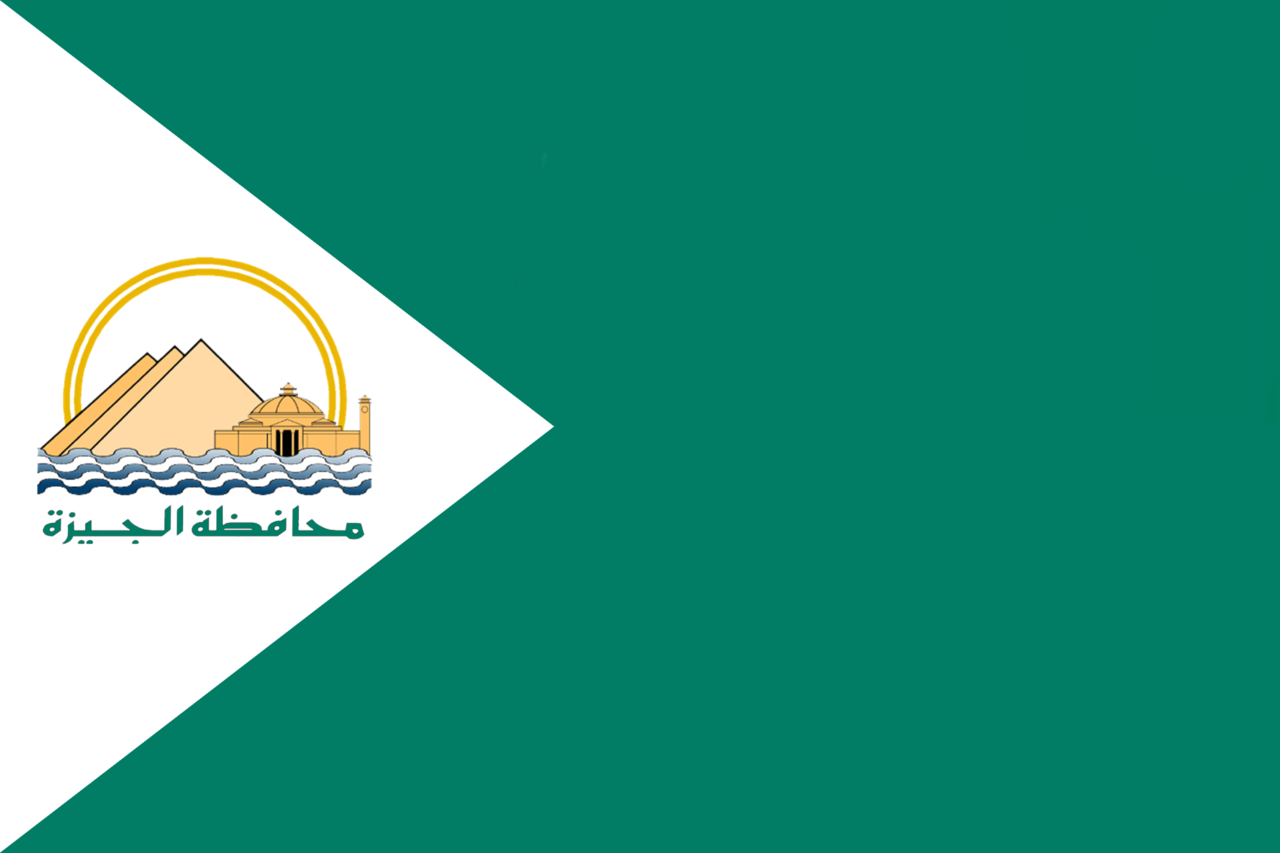
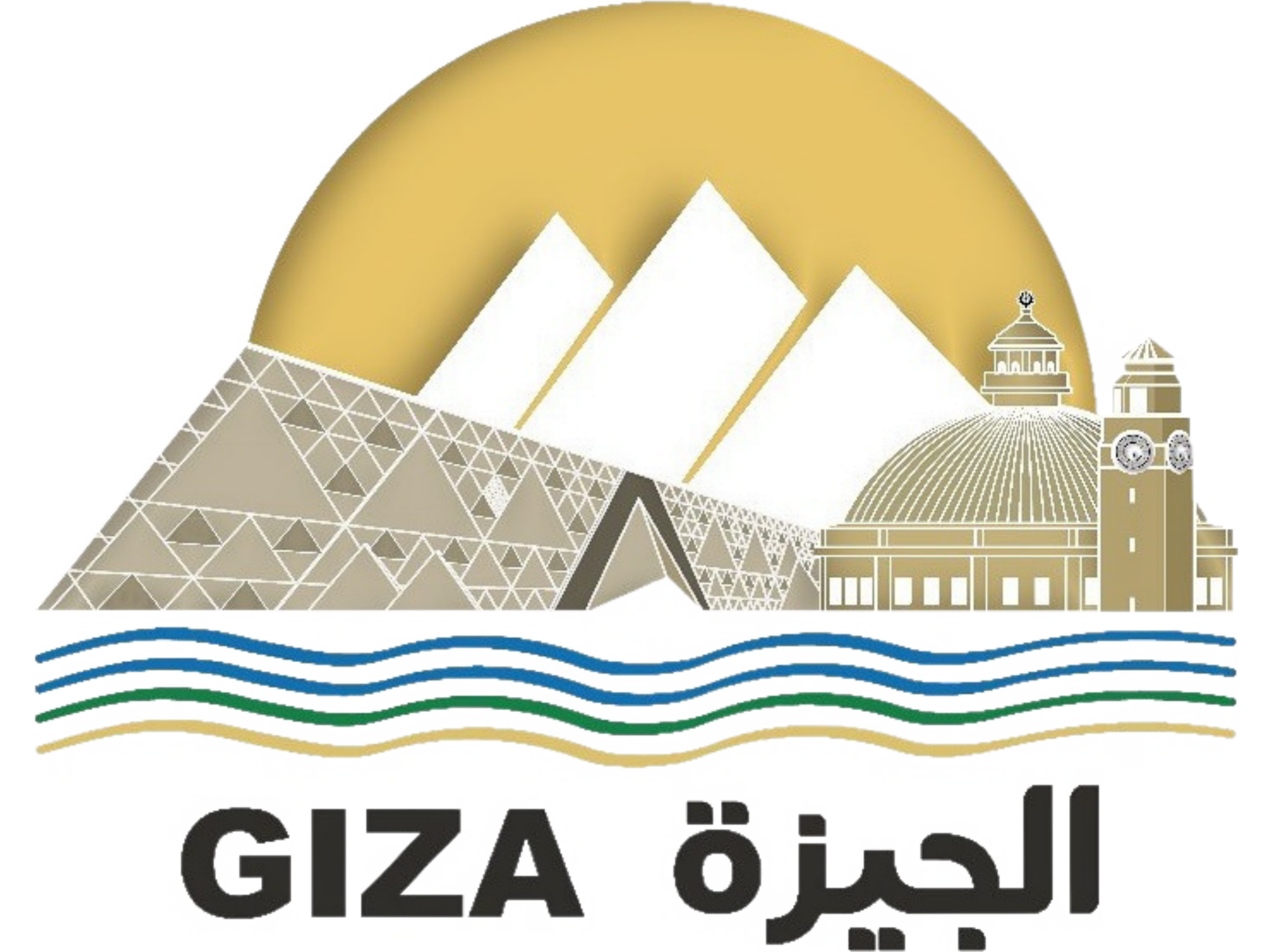
- Flag Seal

- Location of Giza within Egypt Giza (Africa)
- Coordinates: 29.9870°N 31.2118°E
- Country: Egypt
- Governorate: Giza
- Metropolitan area: Greater Cairo
- Founded: 642 AD

Government
  - Governor: Ahmed Rashed

Area
  - Total: 98.4 km^{2} (38.0 sq mi)
- Elevation: 30 m (98 ft)

Population (2023)
  - Total: 4,458,135
  - Rank: 3rd
  - Density: 45,300/km^{2} (117,000/sq mi)
  - Demonym: Gizan (m) Gizanne (f)
- Time zone: UTC+2 (EET)
  - Summer (DST): UTC+3 (EEST)
- 7-Digit: 3759914
- Area code: (+20) 2
- Website: Giza.gov.eg

Giza (Note: English: /ˈɡiːzə/; also romanized Gizah, Gizeh, Geeza, Jiza; Egyptian Arabic: الجيزه el-Gīza [elˈgiːzæ].) is the third-largest city in Egypt by area and population, and is also the eighteenth-largest city in Africa by population. It is the capital of Giza Governorate with a total population of 4,458,135 as of 2023. It is located on the west bank of the Nile opposite central Cairo, and is a part of the Greater Cairo metropolis. With 45,300 inhabitants per square kilometer (117,000/sq mi), it is one of the world's most densely populated cities proper. Giza lies less than 30 kilometres (20 miles) north of Memphis (Men-nefer, today the village of Mit Rahina), which was the capital city of the unified Egyptian state during the reign of pharaoh Narmer, roughly 3100 BC.

Giza is most famous as the location of the Giza Plateau, the site of some of the most impressive ancient monuments in the world, including a complex of ancient Egyptian royal mortuary and sacred structures, among which are the Great Sphinx, the Great Pyramid of Giza, and a number of other large pyramids and temples, and the Grand Egyptian Museum. Giza has always been a focal point in Egypt's history due to its location close to Memphis, the ancient Egyptian capital of the Old Kingdom.

In 2025, Giza was visited by 14.7 million tourists, becoming the most popular tourist destination in Egypt. Its historic centre is listed by UNESCO as a World Heritage Site. Giza also hosts the headquarters of several Egyptian multinational companies and banks. Rich in ancient Egyptian heritage, hotels, restaurants, and bazaars, Giza is considered an important economic, scientific, and tourism centre of Egypt and Africa. The Giza Zoo, the first zoo built in Africa, is located in Giza. The city also is the home of the association football club Zamalek SC.

== Districts and population ==
The city of Giza is the capital of the Giza Governorate, and is located near the northeast border of this governorate.

=== 2017 population and administrative divisions ===
Giza city is a municipal division and capital of Giza governorate with an appointed city head. It comprises nine districts (ahya', singl. hayy) and five new towns (mudun jadidah) administered by the New Urban Communities Authority (NUCA).

The districts/qisms fully subsume to the city head and according to the 2017 census had 4,872,448 residents:

District/qism	Code 2017	Population
Shamal (North)/ Imbâba	210100	632,599
Agouza, al-	210200	278,479
Duqqî, al-	210300	70,926
Janoub (South)/ Jîza, al-	210400	285,723
Bûlâq al-Dakrûr	210500	960,031
`Umrâniyya, al-	210600	366,066
Ṭâlbiyya, al-	210700	457,667
Ahrâm, al-	210800	659,305
Warrâq, al-	211700	722,083
Shaykh Zâyid, al (new city)	211900	90,699
6 October 1 (new city)	212000	93,012
6 October 2 (new city)	212100	196,373
6 October 3 (new city)	212300	59,485

The new towns are mostly administered by the national level New Urban Communities Authority (NUCA), with some public services under the jurisdiction of Giza. They are confusingly named madina (city), however they are not administratively incorporated as such where many are formed of a single district or qism. Ones not in the 2017 census as they were not yet incorporated, or inhabited at that time are:

- New 6th of October
- October Gardens
- New Sphinx

Permanently inhabited Nile islands:

- Qorsaya Island (Janoub/Giza district)
- Dahab Island (Janoub/Giza district)
- Al-Warraq Island (Al-Warraq district)

=== 2006 population ===
The city's population was reported as 2,681,863 in the 2006 national census, while the governorate had 6,272,571 at the same census, without specifying what the city is. The former figure corresponds to the sum of nine districts/qisms.

Region	(Population)	Area km^{2}
Region	2006	Area km^{2}
Giza, 9 kisms (contiguous)	2,681,863	98.4
Giza, 10 kisms (not contiguous)	2,822,271	115.7
Giza, 10 kisms + Giza markaz (contiguous)	3,063,777	187
Giza, 10 kisms + Giza, Kerdasa, Ossim markaz (contiguous)	–	338.9

== Geography and climate ==
Giza's most famous landform and archaeological site, the Giza Plateau, holds some major monuments of Egyptian history, and is home to the Great Sphinx. Once thriving with the Nile that flowed right into the Giza Plateau, the pyramids of Giza were built overlooking the ancient Egyptian capital city of Memphis, across the river from modern day Cairo. The Great Pyramid of Giza at one time was advocated (1884) as the location for the Prime Meridian, a reference point used for determining a base longitude.

=== Climate ===
Giza experiences a hot desert like arid climate (Köppen: BWh). Its climate is similar to Cairo, owing to its proximity. Windstorms can be frequent across Egypt in spring, bringing Saharan dust into the city during the months of March and April. High temperatures in winter range from 16 to 20 °C (61 to 68 °F), while nighttime lows drop to below 7 °C (45 °F). In summer, the highs are 40 °C (104 °F), and the lows can drop to about 20 °C (68 °F). Rain is infrequent in Giza; snow is extremely rare.

Up to August 2013, the highest recorded temperature was 46 °C (115 °F) on 13 June 1965, while the lowest recorded temperature was 2 °C (36 °F) on 8 January 1966.

Climate data for Giza
Month	Jan	Feb	Mar	Apr	May	Jun	Jul	Aug	Sep	Oct	Nov	Dec	Year
Record high °C (°F)	28 (82)	30 (86)	36 (97)	41 (106)	43 (109)	46 (115)	41 (106)	43 (109)	39 (102)	40 (104)	36 (97)	30 (86)	46 (115)
Mean daily maximum °C (°F)	19.3 (66.7)	20.9 (69.6)	24.2 (75.6)	28.4 (83.1)	32.0 (89.6)	34.9 (94.8)	34.5 (94.1)	34.4 (93.9)	32.4 (90.3)	30.2 (86.4)	25.4 (77.7)	21.1 (70.0)	28.1 (82.6)
Daily mean °C (°F)	13.0 (55.4)	14.0 (57.2)	17.2 (63.0)	20.5 (68.9)	24.0 (75.2)	27.1 (80.8)	27.5 (81.5)	27.5 (81.5)	25.6 (78.1)	23.5 (74.3)	19.2 (66.6)	15.0 (59.0)	21.2 (70.1)
Mean daily minimum °C (°F)	6.8 (44.2)	7.2 (45.0)	10.3 (50.5)	12.7 (54.9)	16.1 (61.0)	19.3 (66.7)	20.6 (69.1)	20.7 (69.3)	18.9 (66.0)	16.8 (62.2)	13.0 (55.4)	8.9 (48.0)	14.3 (57.7)
Record low °C (°F)	2 (36)	4 (39)	5 (41)	8 (46)	11 (52)	16 (61)	17 (63)	17 (63)	16 (61)	11 (52)	4 (39)	4 (39)	2 (36)
Average precipitation mm (inches)	4 (0.2)	3 (0.1)	2 (0.1)	1 (0.0)	0 (0)	0 (0)	0 (0)	0 (0)	0 (0)	0 (0)	3 (0.1)	4 (0.2)	17 (0.7)
Source 1: Climate-Data.org
Source 2: Voodoo Skies for record temperatures

== History ==
=== Ancient era ===
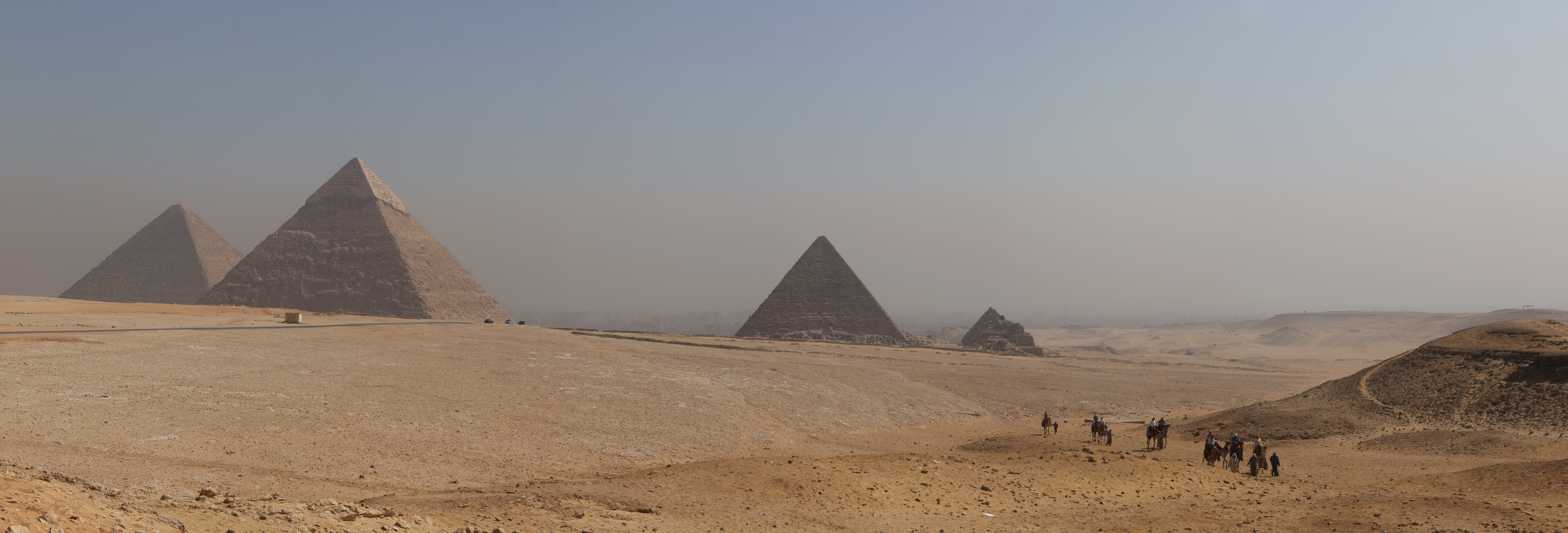
The Giza pyramid complex

The area in what is now Giza served as the necropolis of several pharaohs who ruled ancient Egypt during the second millennium BC. Three of these tombs, in the form of giant pyramids, are what is now the famed Giza pyramid complex, featuring the Great Pyramid of Giza, the Great Sphinx of Giza and the Grand Egyptian Museum.

=== Classical to medieval era ===
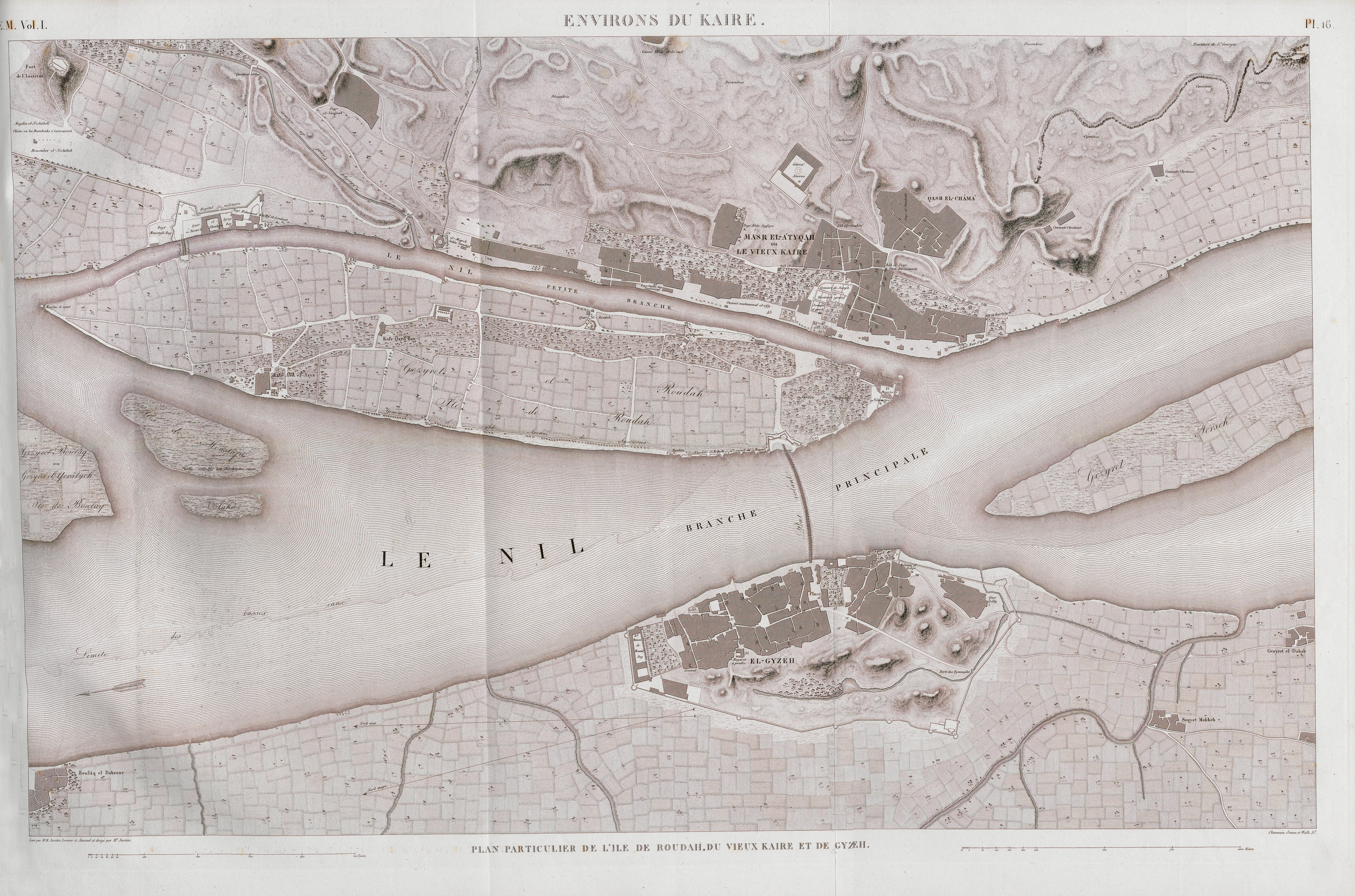
Giza and the bridge from Roda Island in c. 1800 Description de l'Égypte

As ancient Egypt passed under several conquests under the Persians, Greeks, Romans and Byzantines, so did the area in what is now Giza. A Byzantine village named Phylake (Greek: Φυλακή) or Terso (Coptic: ϯⲣⲥⲱ, meaning "the fortress", now Tersa) was located south of Giza and should not be confused with it.

Egyptians called the area Tipersis (Bohairic Coptic: ϯⲡⲉⲣⲥⲓⲥ (Note: Other forms are Coptic: ⲧⲡⲉⲣⲥⲓⲥ, Coptic: ϯⲡⲉⲣⲥⲓⲟⲓ, Coptic: ϯⲡⲉⲣⲥⲓⲟⲥ, Coptic: ϯⲡⲉⲣⲥⲓⲱϯ and Coptic: ⲡⲣⲥⲱⲓ) and Sahidic Coptic: ⲧⲡⲉⲣⲥⲓⲥ ⲛ̀ⲃⲁⲃⲩⲗⲱⲛ, lit. 'the Persian (fortress) of Babylon'). Eutychius gives a legend about the city's name and its foundation by Artaxerxes Ochus or Hūš (Arabic: خوش), and Abu Salih says it was found by him at the same time as Qasr ash-Sham, but as older evidence is missing, it is perhaps most likely to have been founded during the Sasanian conquest of Egypt in the early 7th century.

As Muslims of the fledgling Islamic caliphate went on with their conquest of Egypt from the Byzantine Empire beginning in 639 AD, three years after their victory at the battle of Yarmouk in 636 AD, they conquered all of the land by the time they captured the city of Alexandria in 641 AD. A year later in 642 AD (year 21 in Islamic calendar), they founded the city of Giza. The exact etymology of its name is unknown. Al-Maqrizi suggested an irregular Arameo-Arabic root meaning "edge, side" to be the source. Everett-Heath suggested Ancient Egyptian: r-gs-ḥr "on the side of the height (pyramid)". Peust also suggests a Persian etymology of the word from Middle Persian: 𐭣𐭦, romanized: diz, lit. 'fortress, castle', which Persians could have given to the pyramids or a fortress they found in the area.

== Administration ==
The city is managed by an appointed City Head (President of the city) and the Governor of Giza, who is appointed by the Prime Minister of Egypt. The current Governor of Giza is Major General Adel El-Ghadban (taking office in 2024).

The administration is divided into Executive Council, which is the appointed body that implements government policies and the Local People's Council, which is historically an elected body meant for local oversight (though its functions are largely centralized).

Giza City is divided into 9 urban districts, which are the primary units for day-to-day governance and public services:

- North Giza (Imbaba)
- Agouza
- Dokki
- South Giza
- Bulaq el-Dakrur
- El-Omrania
- El-Talbiya
- El-Haram (The Pyramids district)
- El-Warraq

Many regional and national government entities have offices within Giza to serve the Greater Cairo area such as; the Giza Governorate Headquarters, Health Affairs Directorate, Giza Elementary Court, and Foreign Ministry Legalization Office.

== Economy ==
The city is considered a hub of Egyptian filmmaking studios such as Studio Misr and El-Ahram Studio, and several movie production companies have their headquarters in Giza.

A main source of income in Giza is tourism as a home to many historical sites including the Great Pyramid and Pyramid of Djoser and the Grand Egyptian Museum.

Chemicals is an important industry in Giza, Giza Paints & Chemical Industries was established in 1984.

Giza has many luxury apartment buildings along the Nile, making it a popular place to live.

=== Tourism ===
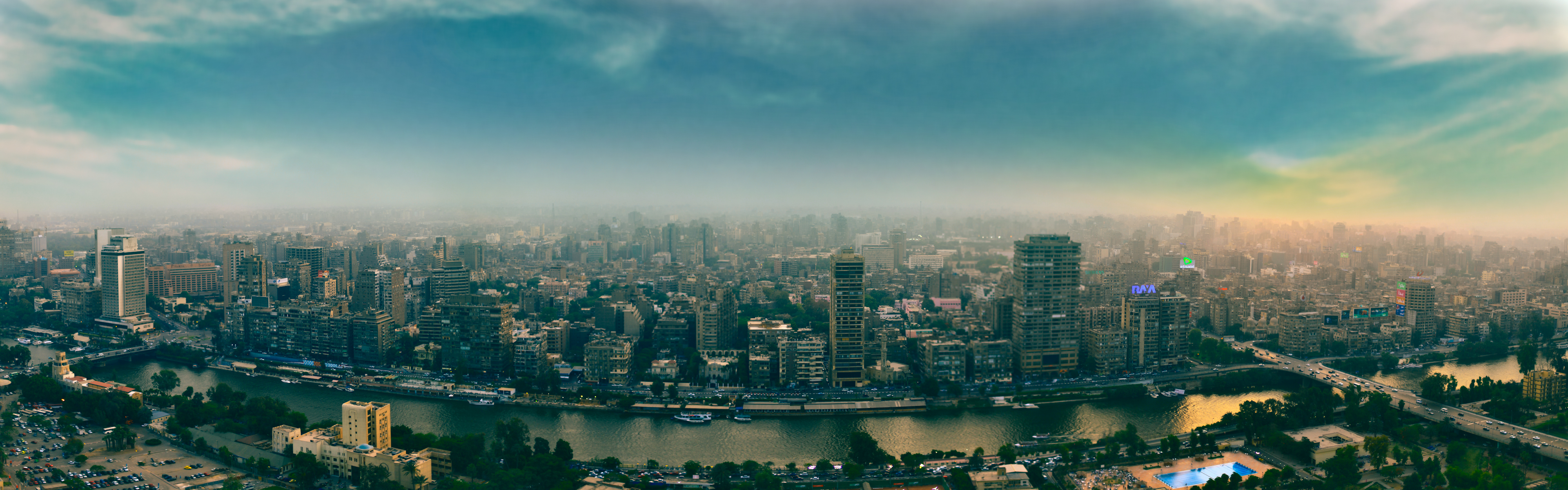
Cityscape of the banks of the Nile

A vital revenue source, with millions of visitors coming to see the Giza Pyramids and ancient artifacts. Tourism revenues reached $15.3 billion nationally in 2024.

==== Giza Plateau ====
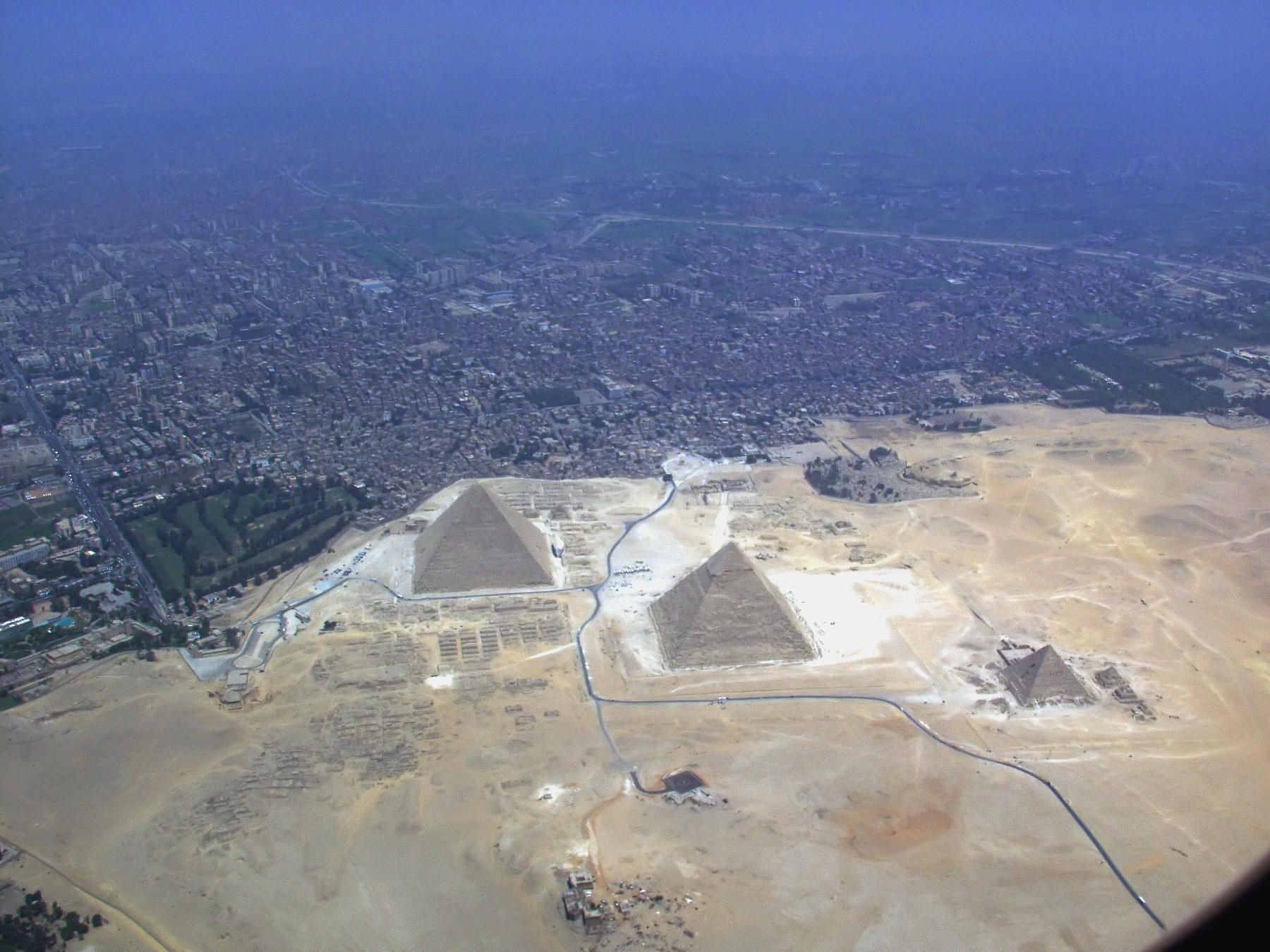
Aerial view of Giza pyramid complex

Giza Plateau has several remains from the 26th century BC such as temples and monuments to Egyptian Pharaohs including the Great Sphinx, and the Great Pyramids of Giza. The Giza Plateau also includes Saqqara, the ancient burial ground which served as the necropolis for the Ancient Egyptian capital of Memphis. It features numerous pyramids, including the world's oldest standing step pyramid, as well as a number of mastabas.

==== Pharaonic Village ====
The Jacob Island was transformed into a highly accurate replica of ancient Egyptian life, in 1974. The village contains the Mummification Museum, Replica of Tutankhamun's Tomb and Village souvenirs. Also from modern era, the village includes museums for former Presidents; Gamal Abdel Nasser Museum and Anwar Sadat.

==== Giza Zoo ====
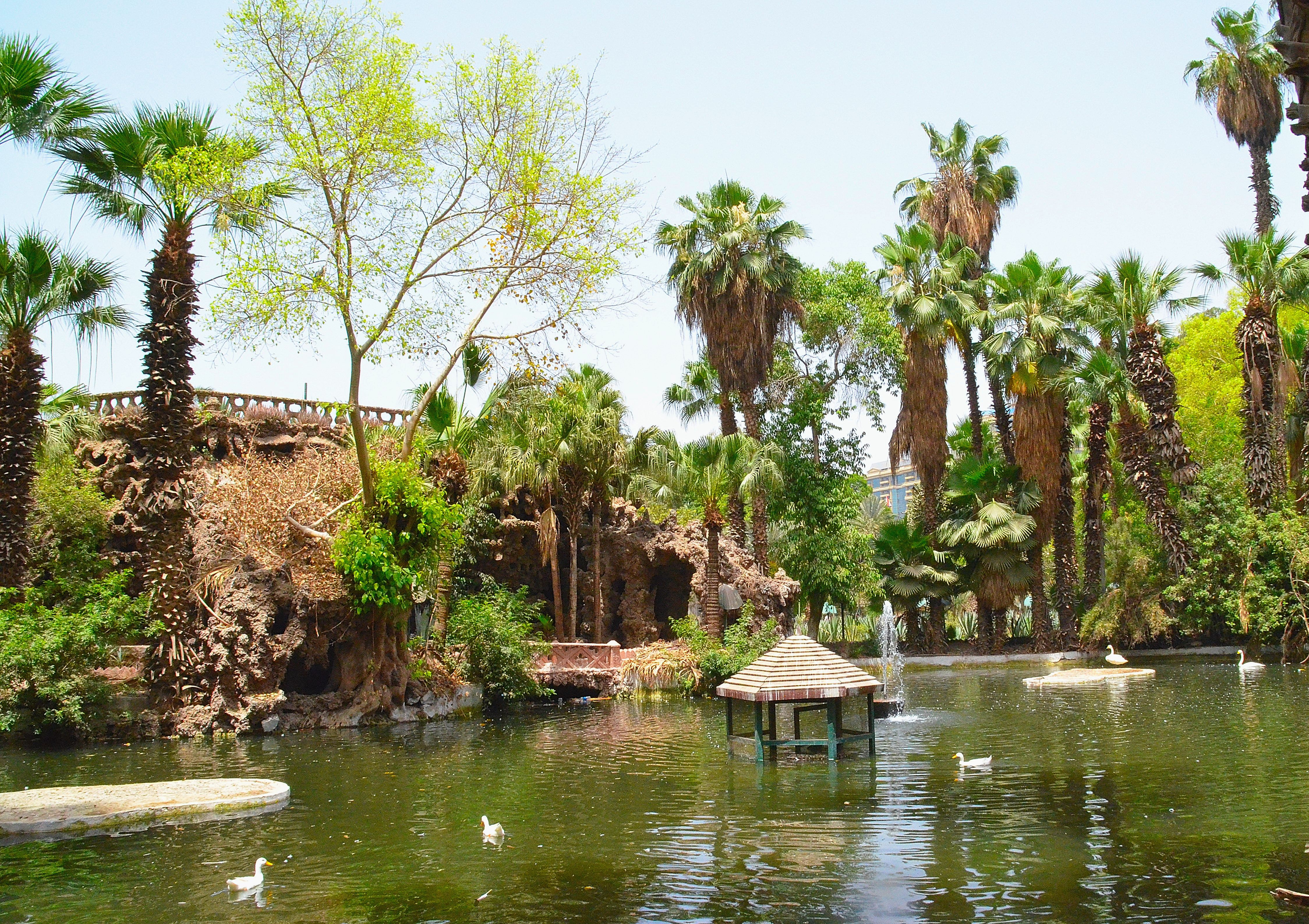
View of the lake of Giza Zoo

The Giza Zoo was established on March 1, 1891, it holds the distinction of being Africa's first zoo and the world's third oldest zoological garden. Located on approximately 80 acres (32 hectares), the zoo was originally designed as a botanical garden and features several historical architectural elements.

===== Historical features =====
The zoo contains several notable architectural and cultural landmarks:

- A suspension bridge designed by Gustave Eiffel (1875–1879), considered the world's first elevated zoo viewing platform
- The Japanese Kiosk, constructed in 1924 during King Fuad's reign
- Original gates from the Khedive's Palace and Haramlik Palace
- Roads paved with black stone imported from Trieste
- Mosaic-decorated footpaths
- A marble island known as Tea Island

===== Animal collection =====
The zoo houses approximately 4,000 animals representing over 175 species, including:

- Large mammals: Lions, tigers, giraffes, rhinoceros, hippopotamuses
- Primates: Various monkey and ape species
- Birds: Native and exotic species including flamingos and rare birds
- Reptiles: Including Egyptian cobras and Nile crocodiles

===== Recent developments =====
In 2023, the Egyptian government announced plans to expand the number of animal species from 71 to 186. The renovation project includes:

- Creation of specialized zones: Asia, Africa, America, Family Zone, Safari Trips
- Establishment of educational centers
- Preservation of historical landmarks
- Improvement of animal enclosures

==== Orman Garden ====
Orman Garden

The garden covers about 28 acres. Today, the garden contains a rock garden, a rose garden, cactus gardens, and probably the most notable feature, the lotus pond. small botanical museum attached to the garden shelters herbaria dating from the Khedive Ismail and furniture from the king Farouk.

== Infrastructure ==
Giza has seen many changes over time. Changes in infrastructure during thousands of years of Egyptian history. Giza is a thriving centre of Egyptian culture and is quite heavily populated, with many facilities and buildings in the current area. Giza saw much attention in particular to its vast amount of ancient Egyptian heritage on the Giza Plateau, and has astonished millions of visitors and tourists over the years.

=== Education ===
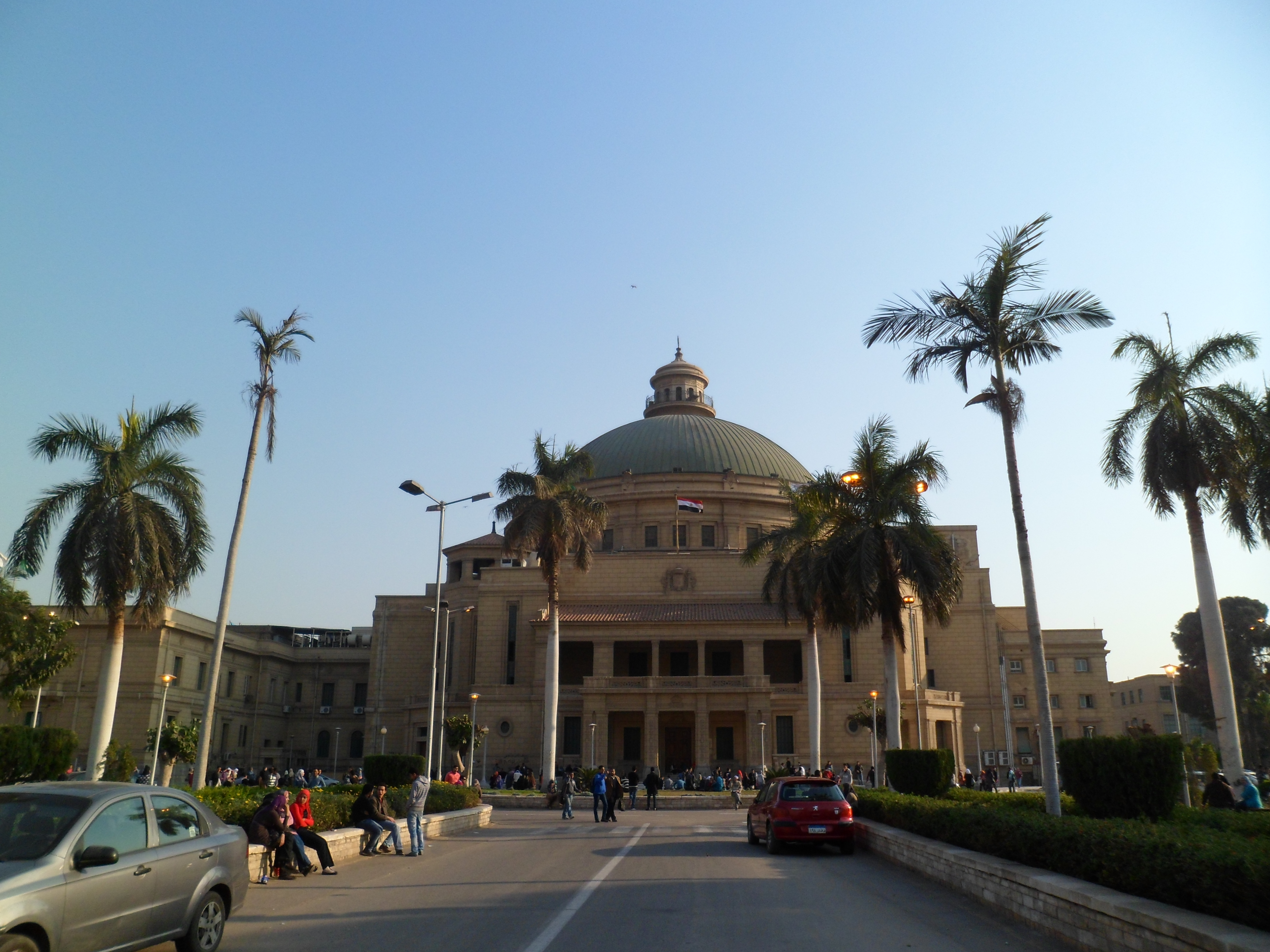
Cairo University

Giza's learning institutions include Cairo University, which was moved to Giza in 1924. The city is a hub of education and educational services not only for Egypt but also for the entire Mediterranean Region. Giza has numerous schools, kindergartens, and institutes of higher learning.

MSA University, founded in 1996, the university is accredited by the Egyptian and British ministry of education and graduate students can study in Britain without any equivalence. Institute of Aviation Engineering and Technology, is an Engineering private faculty. It is a part of the Ministry Of Civil Aviation in Egypt, and the Ministry Of Higher Education under the academic supervision of Faculty of Engineering, Cairo University.

Also the Higher Institute Of Cinema, also known as the Cairo Higher Institute of Cinema, is a film school. It is one of several institutes making up the Egyptian Academy of Arts. Founded in 1959, it is the oldest film school in the Middle East and Africa.

The Cairo Japanese School, a Japanese international school, is in Giza. Also the Deutsche Evangelische Oberschule, a German international school, is located in Dokki in Giza. Previously the Pakistan International School of Cairo had its campus in Giza.

=== Healthcare ===
Healthcare services are widely available in Giza, ranging from private to public facilities, including internationally accredited hospitals, clinics, and numerous local pharmacies. The Egyptian government has prioritized improving healthcare through investment in the development of public hospitals. Private hospitals and medical centers in Giza include; ABC Hospital, AL Kawkab Hospital, Sphinx Specialized Hospital, Gannah Hospital, Al Assema Hospital, El Safa Hospital, El Salam Hospital El Haram, Giza Specialized Hospital, and El Shorouk Hospital.

=== Transport ===
==== Air ====
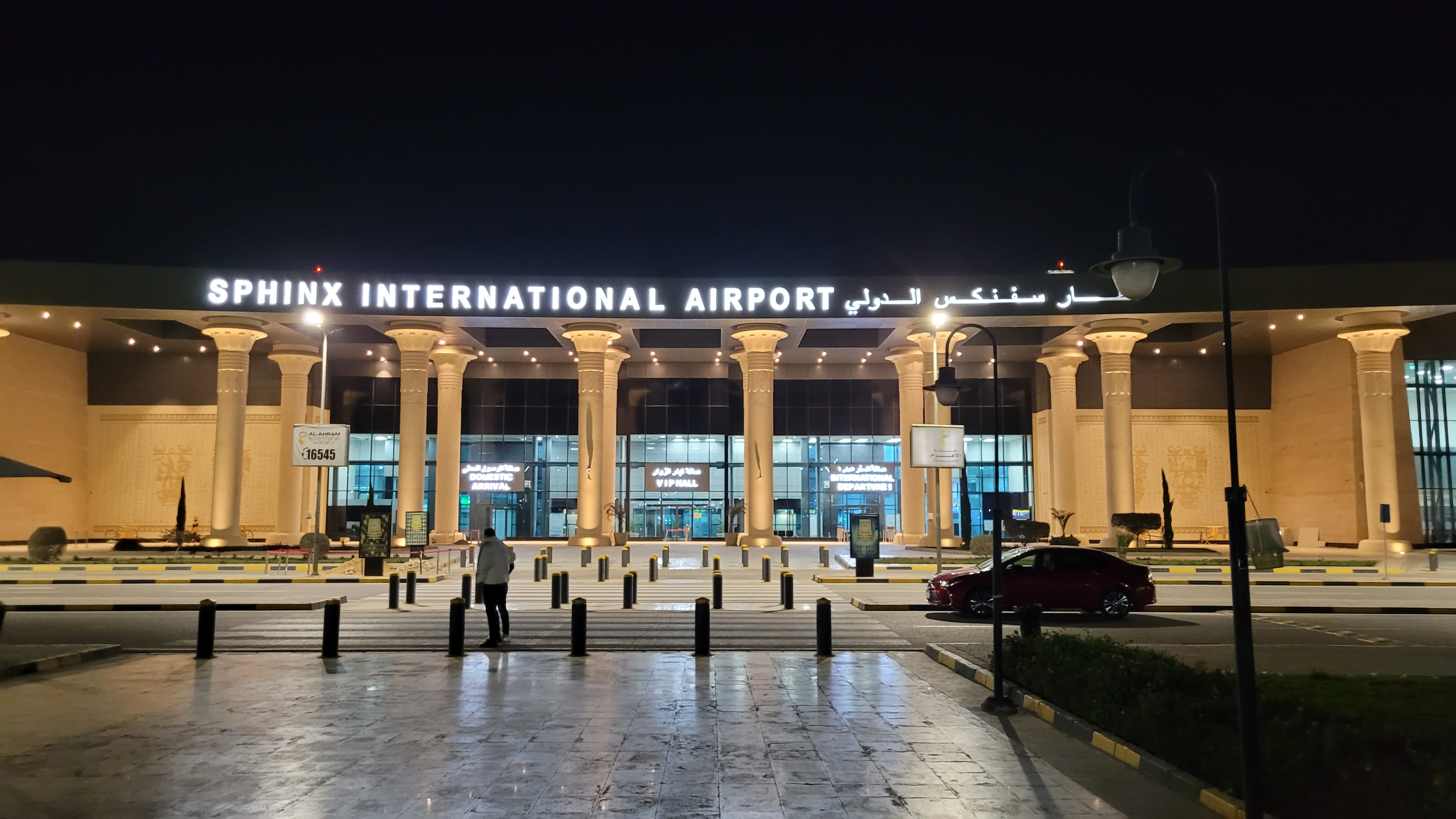
Sphinx International Airport terminal 1

Access to the city of Giza, which has its own governorate adjacent to the Governorate of Cairo, is dependent on the Cairo International Airport. It is an international airport located on the Cairo–Alexandria desert road, 45 kilometers from Giza. The Sphinx International Airport was opened in 2018 as an alternative to the already congested Cairo International Airport, but also to improve accessibility to the Giza necropolis as well as to the Grand Egyptian Museum. The airport was established to relieve the pressure on Cairo International Airport and also serving the cities of Sheikh Zayed and 6th of October areas and some nearby governorates such as Beni Suef and Fayoum.

==== Train ====
Bashteel Railway Station, also called Upper Egypt Railway Station, is a major railway station, and the main railway station in Giza. It is located in Bashteel district. It is intended to serve as a new major railway hub in Greater Cairo and to relieve congestion at Ramses Station.

==== Metro ====
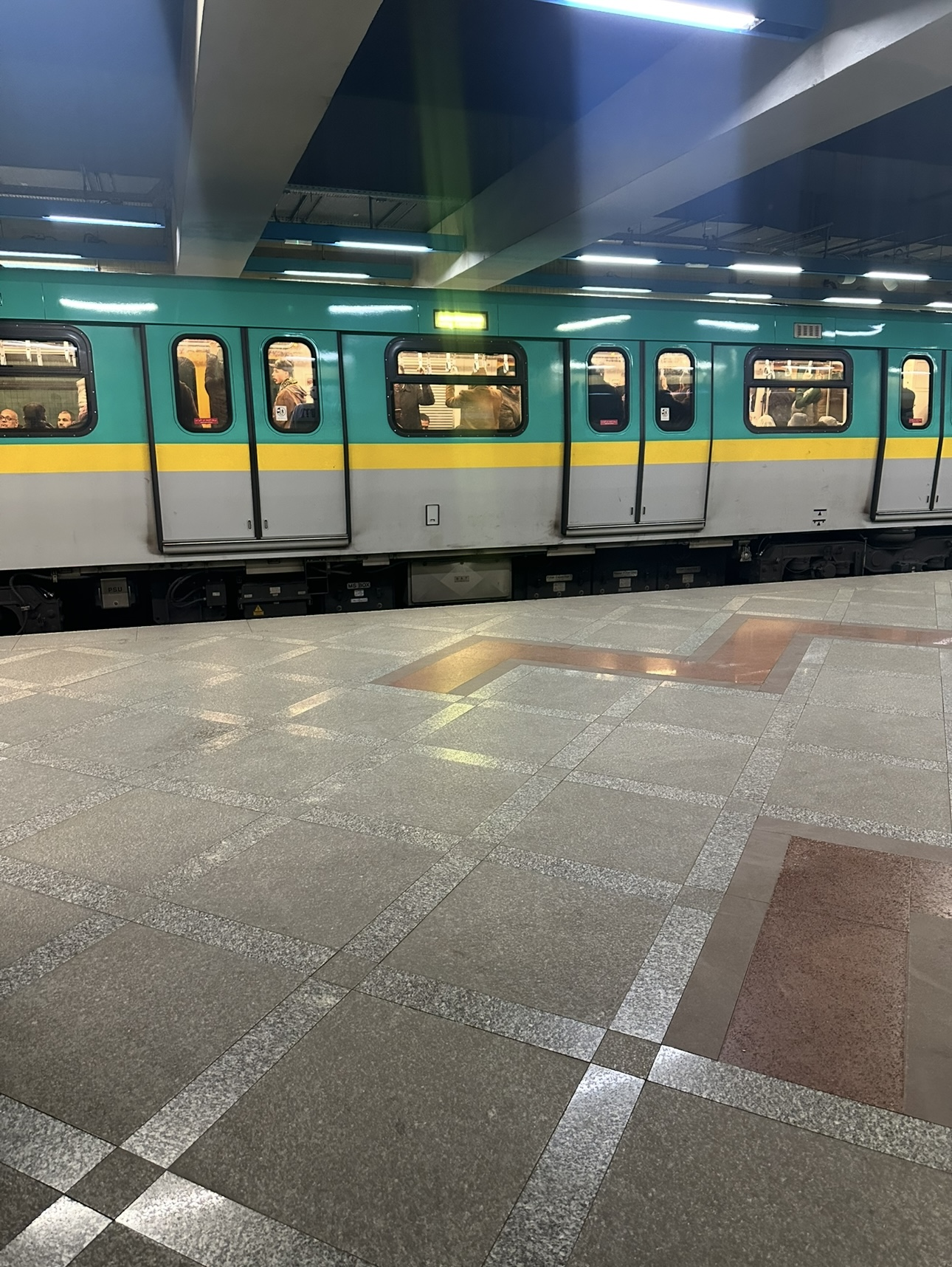
The Cairo Metro (line 3)

Giza shares with Cairo a subway system, officially called the "Metro (مترو)", a fast and efficient way of getting around. An extensive road network connects Giza with 6th of October City, Cairo and other cities. There are flyovers and bridges such as the 15th. Traffic in Giza is known to be overwhelming and overcrowded.

==== Roads ====
An extensive road network connects Giza with other Egyptian cities. There is a Ring Road that surrounds the outskirts of the Cairo metropolitan area. There are flyovers, tunnels and bridges, such as the Saft El Laban axis that, when the traffic is not heavy, allow fast means of transportation from one side of the city to the other. Giza traffic is known to be overwhelming and overcrowded.

Other means of transport include:

- Cairo Taxi
- Uber (available in Cairo and Giza since 2015)
- Careem (available in Cairo and Giza since 2015)
- Swvl (available in Cairo and Giza since 2017)
- Water taxis (motorized feluccas) available for transport to nearby places along the Nile River.

==== Bus system ====
There are two types of buses in Giza, the minibuses and public buses. Bus lines are spread all over the Greater Cairo area, and are considered the main mean of transport for many Cairenes.

== Culture ==
=== Museums ===
==== Grand Egyptian Museum ====
Main entrance of the GEM

All of the collection of the Museum of Egyptian Civilization, including the Tutankhamun collection, are slated to be moved to the new Grand Egyptian Museum, under construction in Giza, and was due to open by the end of 2020. Dedicated to Ancient Egypt and its culture, society, and artifacts, the GEM is the largest museum in the world for a single civilization. The museum also includes a conservation center, a conference center, and various dining and shopping areas.

==== Egyptian Agricultural Museum ====
The Egyptian Agricultural Museum is a museum complex built primarily to showcase the history of agriculture in Egypt throughout its various eras. Located in the Dokki district of Giza, the museum was initially named the "Fouad I Agricultural Museum," it was housed in the palace of Princess Fatima Ismail. The museum later expanded to include several other buildings and museums, encompassing eight museums in one, covering an area of over 30 acres (approximately 175,000 square meters), interspersed with green spaces and gardens. It is considered one of the first and largest agricultural museums in the world and houses 1,451 registered artifacts, in addition to other collections.

==== Mohamed Mahmoud Khalil Museum ====
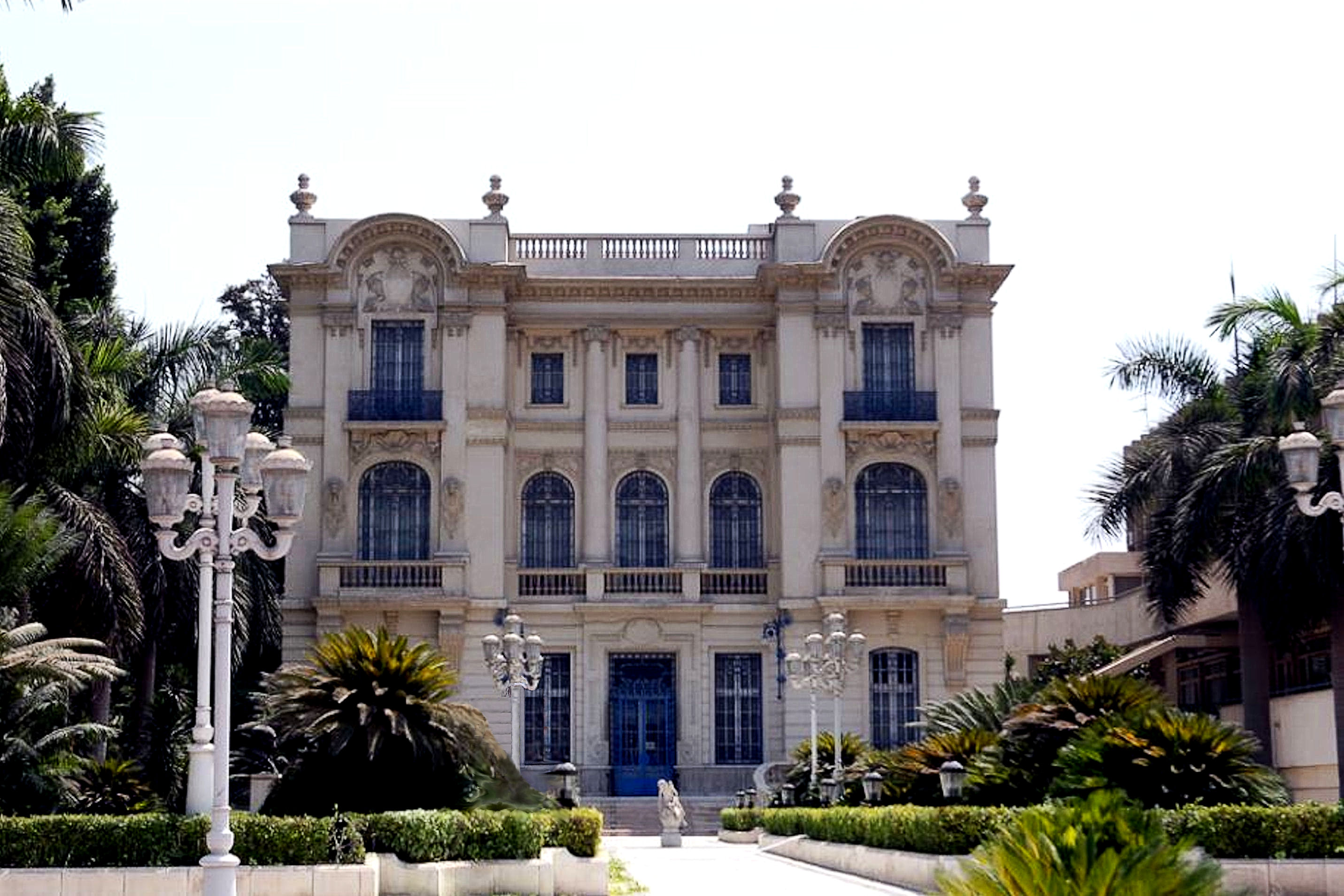
Museum facade

The Mohamed Mahmoud Khalil Museum and Palace is an Egyptian museum located in the Giza district of Cairo. It was founded by Mohamed Mahmoud Khalil. The palace was first opened as a museum in 1962, then moved to the Prince Amr Ibrahim Palace in Zamalek in 1971, before reopening in Zamalek in 1979.

==== Taha Hussein Museum ====
The Taha Hussein Museum is Taha Hussein's villa, also known as "Ramtan," which the Egyptian Ministry of Culture converted into a museum to commemorate the Dean of Arabic Literature. The museum villa consists of two floors and a library.

==== Mohamed Nagy Museum ====
The Mohamed Nagy Museum is a historical photography museum located at Mahmoud El Gendy Street near the Giza Plateau, in the Haram district of Giza, in southwest Greater Cairo. It was founded in 1952 by Mohamed Nagy as his studio, as he was a pioneer of modern Egyptian photography in modern Egypt. After his death, he converted the studio into a museum, which was officially opened by the Egyptian Minister of Culture, Tharwat Okasha, on July 13, 1968. The museum was renovated in 1991.

==== Imhotep Museum ====
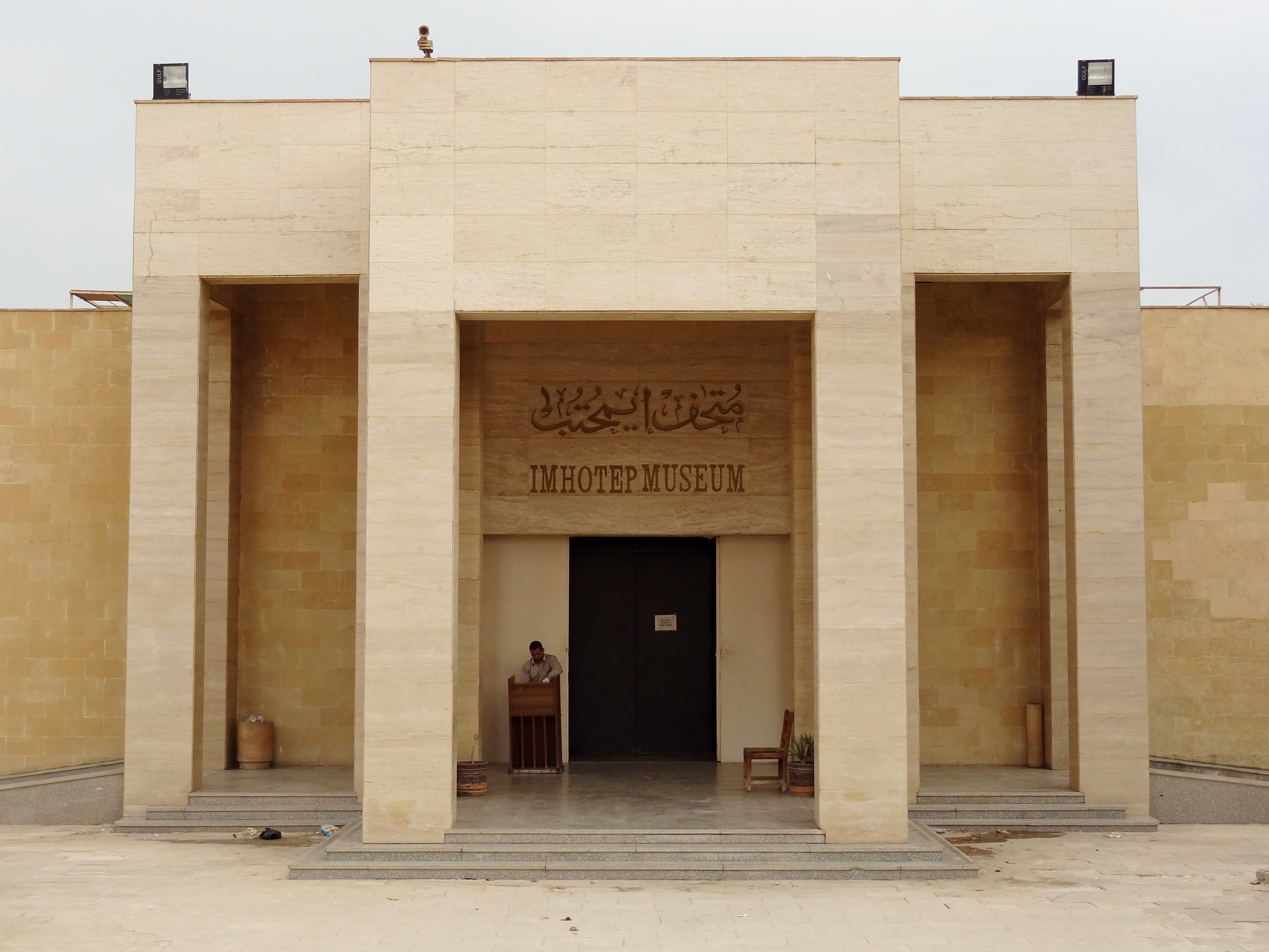
Museum's entrance

The Imhotep Museum is an archaeological museum located at the foot of the Saqqara necropolis complex, near Memphis in Lower Egypt. The museum was established to honor and commemorate the ancient Egyptian architect Imhotep, the builder of King Pyramid of Djoser, as the first to construct a pyramid and the first to use stone in the construction of massive buildings. The museum consists of several halls housing more than 500 rare artifacts unearthed from the Saqqara archaeological site. The museum's exhibits include a model of King Djoser's funerary complex, and one of the halls is designed as a complete tomb displaying a mummy, a wooden coffin, and a number of pottery and alabaster vessels. The museum also houses the library of the Egyptologist Jean-Philippe Lauer.

=== Music ===
Music in Giza is characterized by high-profile international concerts at the Pyramids, historic residency shows, and a vibrant local nightlife scene in the surrounding district. The Pyramids Sound and Light Show is a nightly performance where the Great Sphinx narrates the history of ancient Egypt, accompanied by dramatic music and laser projections.

The city of Giza host several live music venues. The city also has a long history of hosting legendary acts, specifically at the Giza Plateau, such as Grateful Dead played a series of concerts in 1978 during a lunar eclipse. And Jean-Michel Jarre, held on the massive Twelve Dreams of the Sun millennium concert on New Year's Eve 1999.

=== Holidays and festivals ===
Giza Governorate's National Day is celebrated on March 31 each year, commemorating the struggle of Giza's people against the British occupation, specifically the Battle of Nazlet El-Shobak in Badrasheen in 1919, where the locals confronted a train of occupation soldiers and sacrificed martyrs for their country. Cultural celebrations, events, and project inaugurations are held to honor this anniversary. The city also celebrates a mix of Islamic, Coptic Christian, and national holidays, featuring vibrant festivals like the Eid holidays such as Eid al-Fitr, Eid al-Adha, religious observances like Coptic Christmas on January 7 and Mawlid al-Nabi, and national days such as Revolution Day on January 25 and Armed Forces Day on October 6th, alongside cultural events like Sham El-Nessim and unique spectacles offering diverse cultural experiences year-round. Ramadan is the holy month of fasting, observed with special meals and community focus.

=== Painting and sculpture ===
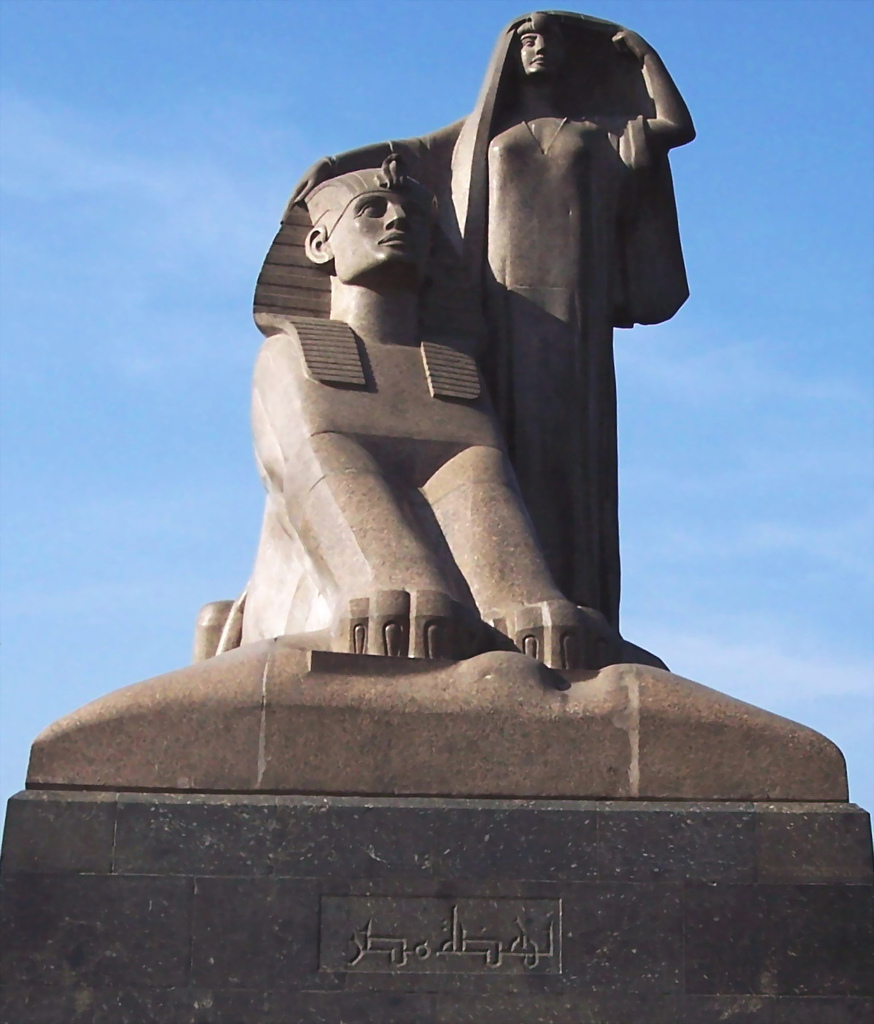
Egypt's Renaissance Statue is a living symbol of modern Egyptian art.

Giza is a destination for both ancient and contemporary art, housing monumental sculptures and dedicated painting museums, located primarily on the Giza Plateau. The Great Sphinx of Giza is the oldest known monumental sculpture in Egypt, this limestone statue depicts a reclining sphinx with the head of a Pharaoh. Evidence suggests it was once painted in bright colors.

The Egypt's Renaissance Statue, located near the Cairo University bridge, the 1928 sculpture by Mahmoud Mokhtar is a key symbol of modern Egyptian identity, blending Egyptian style with 20th-century nationalism. Giza has yielded world-famous works like the Bust of Prince Ankhhaf and the Pair Statue of King Menkaure and Queen, which are celebrated for their realistic portraiture. Modern Giza hosts large-scale international art events that place contemporary sculpture in dialogue with the pyramids.

The Grand Egyptian Museum (GEM) is a landmark institution which showcases thousands of artifacts, including the world's largest collection of Tutankhamun's treasures and numerous monumental statues. Other specialized museums and galleries Ramses Wissa Wassef Art Center and the Museum of Nagy.

=== Media ===
Giza is a global center for media production and is currently expanding its infrastructure with massive 2025 projects. The Egyptian Media Production City (EMPC) is located in 6th of October City, a satellite city in the Giza Governorate, the EMPC is the primary media hub for Egypt. It covers approximately 35 million square meters and features 114 studios equipped for cinematography, TV, and video production.

The Media Public Free Zone was established to attract investment, this zone offers specialized infrastructure, including satellite broadcasting stations and technical service centers for media projects. Besides the United for Media Services, the leading media production companies in Giza include Birdmilk, Big Move Agency, Vision Egypt, and Sway Media.

Several newspapers are based in Giza, such as the Daily News Egypt, the country's only independent English-language daily newspaper, with its headquarters are located in Dokki. Also the El Watan News, which is a comprehensive daily online portal and printed newspaper with its address in Dokki as well. Also the El Wafd, associated with Egyptian Wafd Party. The Egypt Today Magazine and media production company is also located in Giza.

In November 2025, Giza was officially listed in the UNESCO Creative Cities Network in recognition of its deep-rooted legacy in the film and arts industry.

=== Sport ===
The city is home to the 20th century most successful sports club in Africa, the Zamalek Sporting Club, an Egyptian giant, located in the Meet Okba neighborhood near the Mohandiseen district in Giza. Beside the Zamalek Sporting Club, there are other clubs like El Tersana SC and Egyptian Shooting Club which is one of the elite clubs in Egypt, located in Dokki neighborhood.

== International relations ==
=== Twin towns – sister cities ===
Giza is twinned with:

- Istanbul, Turkey
- Los Angeles, United States

== Notable people ==
- Amr Abou El Seoud (born 1968), bank CEO
- Yehia Chahine, actor
- Ahmed El-Ahmar, handball player
- Abdel Halim Ali, football player
- Nora Armani, actor and filmmaker of Armenian descent
- Khaled El-Enany, egyptian egyptologist and politician who was elected as the 11th Director-General of the United Nations Educational, Scientific and Cultural Organization (UNESCO) in November 2025

== See also ==
- List of ancient Egyptian sites
- List of megalithic sites
