= Dahab Island =

Island in Egypt

Native name: جزيرة الذهب
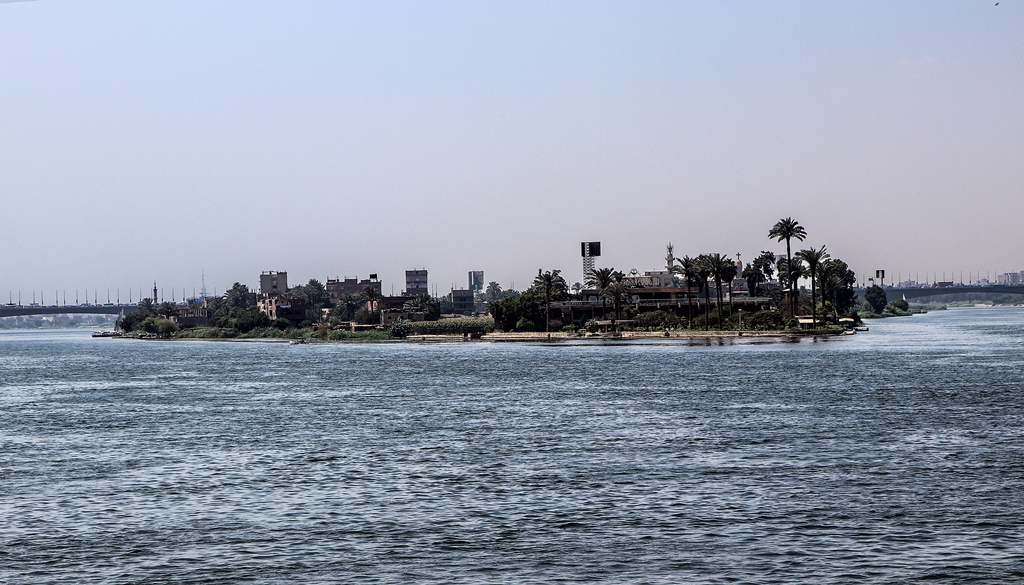
- Northern part of Dahab Island with al-Munib bridge in the background

- Location in Egypt

Geography
- Location: Nile River
- Coordinates: 29.982°N 31.224°E
- Adjacent to: Nile
- Length: 4,200 m (13800 ft)

Administration
- Egypt

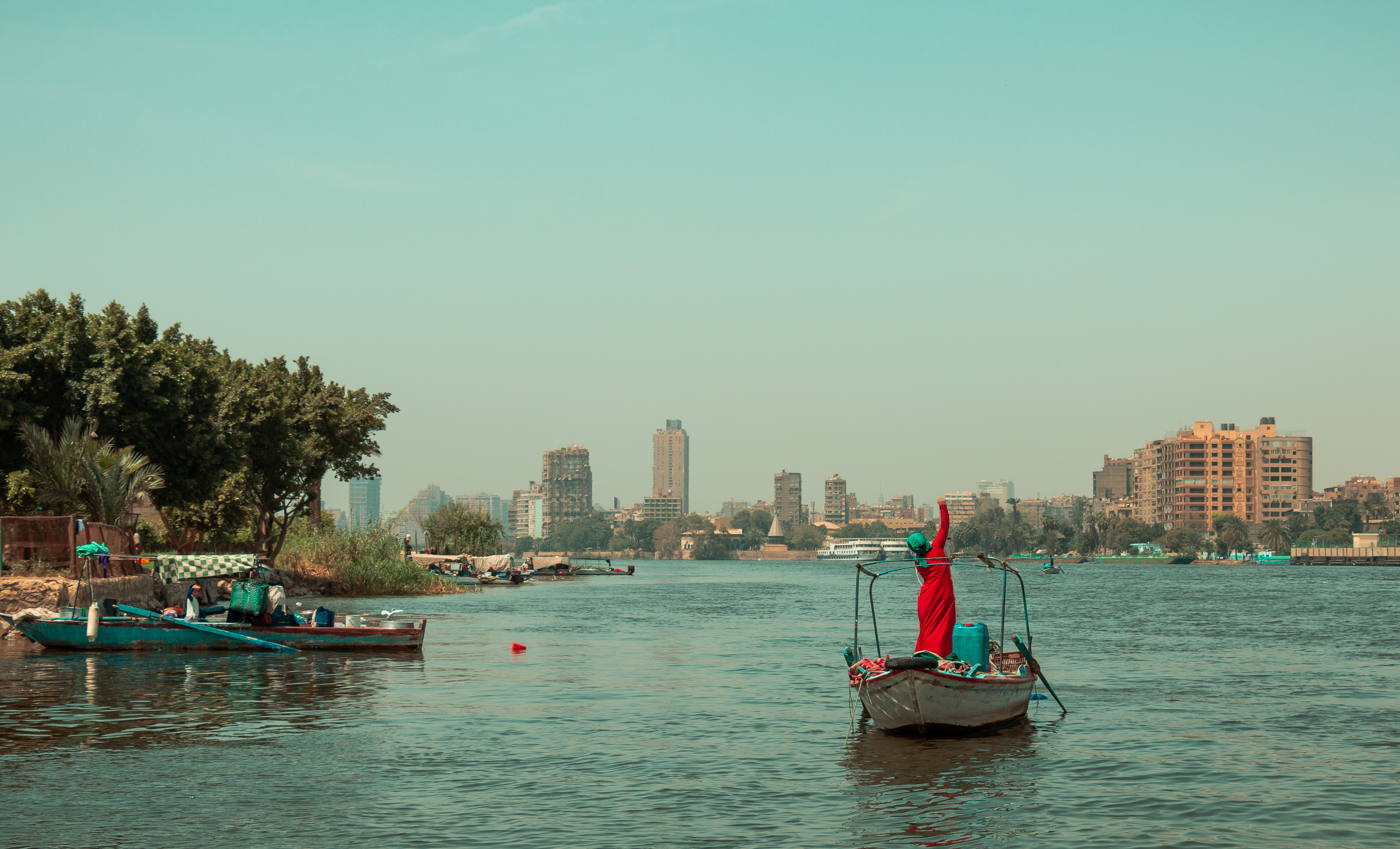
View from Dahab Island;

Dahab Island (or: Gazirat edh-Dhahab, Arabic: جزيرة الذهب, Ǧazīrat aḏ-Ḏahab, "Island of Gold") is a Nile island located in the metropolitan region of Cairo near the eastern Nile shore south of Roda Island and near of Qorsaya Island. The island belongs to Giza and has a strong agricultural character.

The 4,200-metre-long (2.6 mi) Dahab Island is inhabited by roughly 11,000 fishermen and farmers. The island is accessed by ferry.

There is an open conflict between the island residents and the Cairo-development plan of the Egyptian government.
