= Ahmed Moharram =

Egyptian engineer

ORE OME Ahmed Moharram Sr.
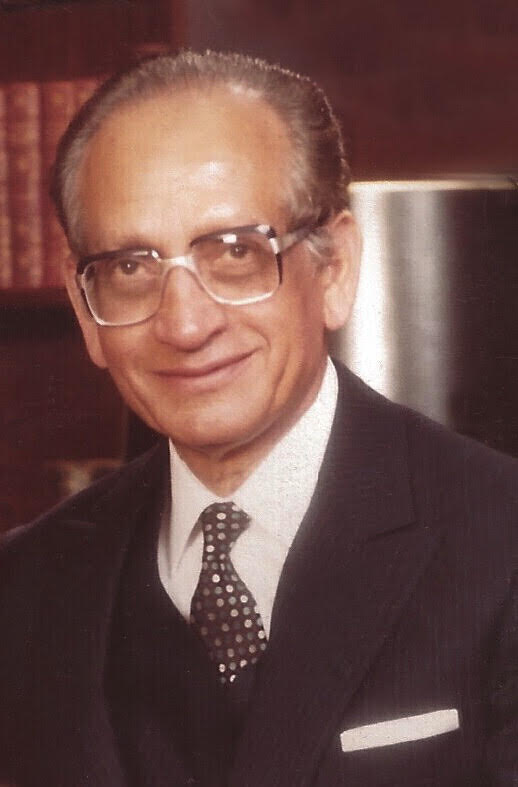
- Born: December 6, 1913
- Died: March 4, 2017 (aged 103)
- Education: Cairo University and King's College London
- Occupations: Co-founder and Chairman of ACE Moharram Bakhoum. Minister of Housing and Public Utilities (1960s) Head of the Egyptian Engineering Society
- Title: Fellow of the Institution of Structural Engineers
- Awards: Medal of the Order of the Republic of the 1st Degree (1964). Medal of the Order of Merit of the 1st Degree (1985). Medal of the Order of Sport Merit of the 1st Degree (1986). Mubarak's Award (currently named the Nile Award) for sciences in 2002. High Dam medal. Shield of Honor, Ain Shams University.

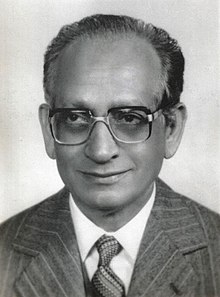
Professor Ahmed Moharram

Ahmed Moharram Sr. (December 6, 1913 – March 4, 2017) was Minister of Housing and Public Utilities in Egypt and the co-founder and chairman of ACE Moharram Bakhoum, an international engineering and project management group. Because of his significant contributions to the housing, infrastructure, and civil engineering, Moharram received honorary medals and awards such as the Medal of the Order of the Republic of the 1st Degree (وسام الجمهورية من الدرجة الأولي) in 1964 from the former president Gamal Abdel Nasser, Medal of the Order of Merit of the 1st Degree (وسام الاستحقاق من الدرجة الأولي) in 1985 from the former president Hosni Mubarak, Mubarak's Award (currently named the Nile Award) in 2002, and several other honors in Egypt. There is also a prize named after him at Cairo University for contributions in engineering.

== Education ==
Moharram obtained his BSc (in 1936) and MSc (in 1946) degrees in civil engineering from Cairo University (then known as the Egyptian University) and was awarded a scholarship to resume his postgraduate studies in the United Kingdom where he obtained a PhD degree in structural engineering from the King's College London in 1949.

== Significant contributions to Egyptian construction and infrastructure ==
After completing his postgraduate studies, he partnered with his colleague Michel Bakhoum in 1950 to establish an engineering consultancy, maximizing on the international education of both partners. Numerous high-profile projects led to the rapid growth of the firm, and expansion into Africa and the Middle East region. Moharram acted as the chairman of ACE Moharram Bakhoum until his death in 2017.

Among several other significant achievements, Moharram was the first to propose constructing the 6th of October bridge in the 1960s. He designed the bridge and supervised its construction as well. Now it is called the 'spinal cord' of Cairo, with approximately half a million Cairene people using it on a daily basis. Moharram is also known for designing and constructing the first cable-stayed bridge in Cairo. He is also responsible for designing and supervising the construction of some of the Egyptian National projects at his time, such as:

- The Cairo Metro and Alexandria Subway
- Cairo International Airport
- Luxor International Airport
- 6th of October bridge
- Ring road around Greater Cairo (114 km) and the Regional ring road (230 km)
- The Egyptian Ministry of Foreign Affairs' landmark tower (140 meters)
- Ahmed Hamdi Tunnel under the Suez Canal
- Suez Canal Cable Stayed Bridge
- Greater Cairo Wastewater Project
- Egyptian Cement Plant
- Sheikh Zayed City
- Rod-Al Farag Axis Cable Stayed Bridge (Registered in Guinness world record as the widest cable-stayed bridge in the World)

== Academic and political life ==
After his academic tenure at Cairo University, and later Ain Shams University, Moharram moved on to a career in public service in the Egyptian government. As the minister of housing and public utilities in the 1960s, he formulated legal policy (Law No. 6 of 1964) concerning the production of design and construction provisions for all types of Egyptian structures. This law is the basis on which Egyptian design codes are issued up to this date and is currently being produced and modified regularly by a committee that incorporates hundreds of highly experienced and specialized engineers and academics. As the minister of housing and public utilities, Moharram supervised the contracting sector that completed the first stage of the Aswan High Dam project in Upper Egypt. Ahmed Moharram Sr. also served as a head of the Egyptian Engineering Society for 12 years. He was a Fellow of the Institution of Structural Engineers.

== Honors ==
Ahmed Moharram Sr. is the recipient of several of the highest medals of honor in Egypt:

- Medal of the Order of the Republic of the 1st Degree (وسام الجمهورية من الدرجة الأولي) in 1964 from the former president Gamal Abdel Nasser.
- Medal of the Order of Merit of the 1st Degree (وسام الاستحقاق من الدرجة الأولي) in 1985 from the former president Hosni Mubarak.
- Medal of the Order of Sport Merit of the 1st Degree (وسام الرياضة من الدرجة الأولي) in 1986 for designing Cairo International Stadium.
- Mubarak's Award (currently named the Nile Award) for sciences in 2002.
- High Dam medal.
- Shield of Hoonor, Ain Shams University.
- Honored by the International Bridges Conference that was held by the Egyptian Society of Engineers in Sharm El-Sheikh, March 2002, for his leadership in the field of bridges
- Honored by the Academy of Scientific Research by granting him shields on many occasions
- Honored by the Egyptian Society of Engineers on many occasions
