= Rod El Farag Axis Bridge =

Highway bridge over Nile River in Egypt

Tahya Misr Bridge
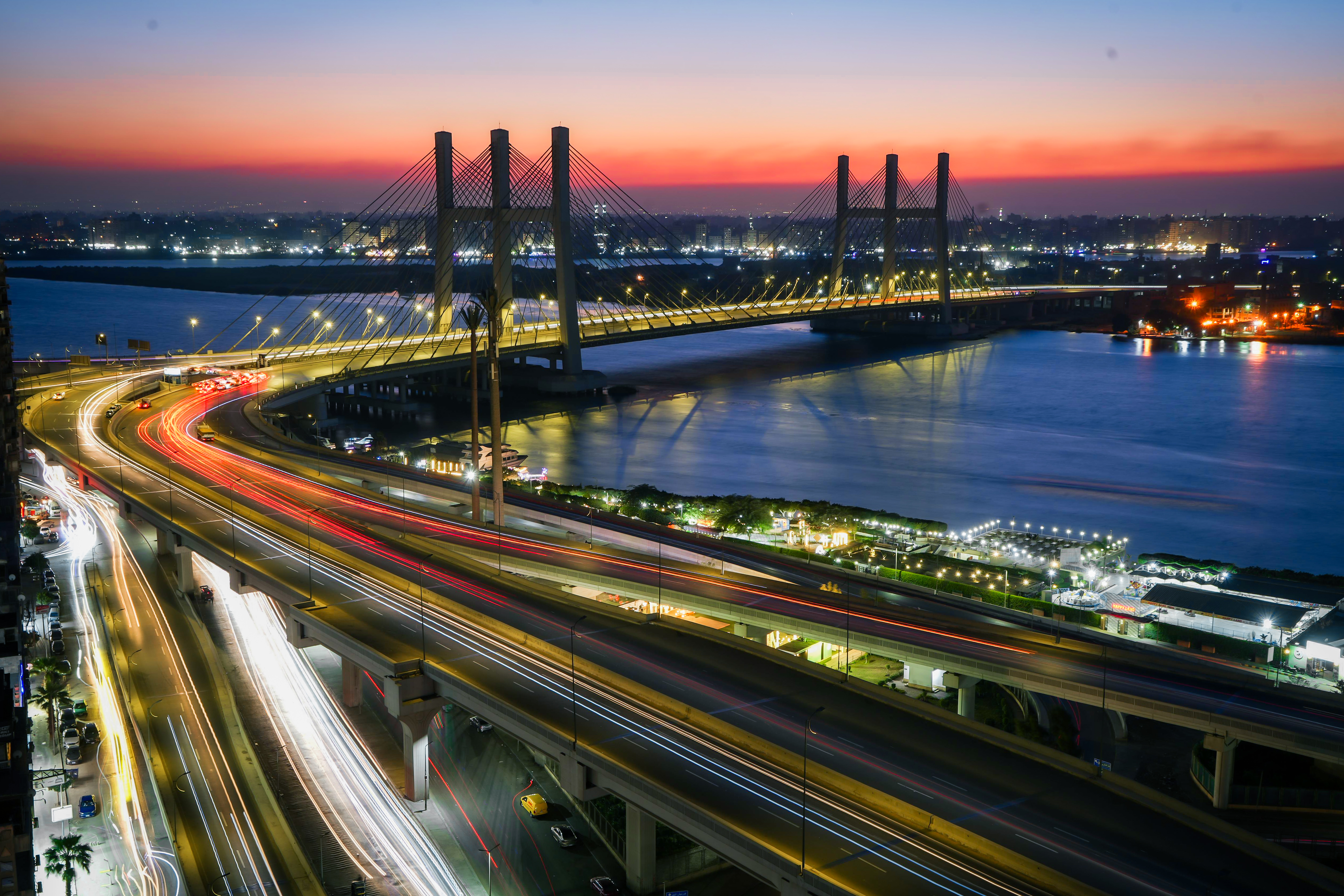
- View of the Tahya Misr Bridge
- Coordinates: 30°06′08″N 31°14′15″E
- Crosses: Nile
- Locale: Cairo
- Maintained by: Cairo Governorate

Characteristics
- Design: Cable-stayed suspension bridge
- Width: 67.3 m

History
- Designer: ACE Moharram Bakhoum
- Constructed by: Arab Contractors

Location
- Interactive map of Tahya Misr Bridge

The Rod El Farag Axis Bridge or simply Tahya Misr Bridge (Egyptian Arabic: كوبرى تحيا مصر) is a cable-stayed bridge over the Nile river located in the region of Rod El Farag crossing through Cairo, Egypt. It was built by the Arab Contractors. With a width of 67.3 meters, the bridge holds the Guinness World Record for the world's widest cable-stayed bridge.

The bridge has become a major tourist attraction in the city of Cairo due to its unique location, where visitors can cross the side pedestrian walkways, which have panoramic views of the banks of the Nile and a transparent glass walkway in which visitors can walk over the Nile.

== Overview ==
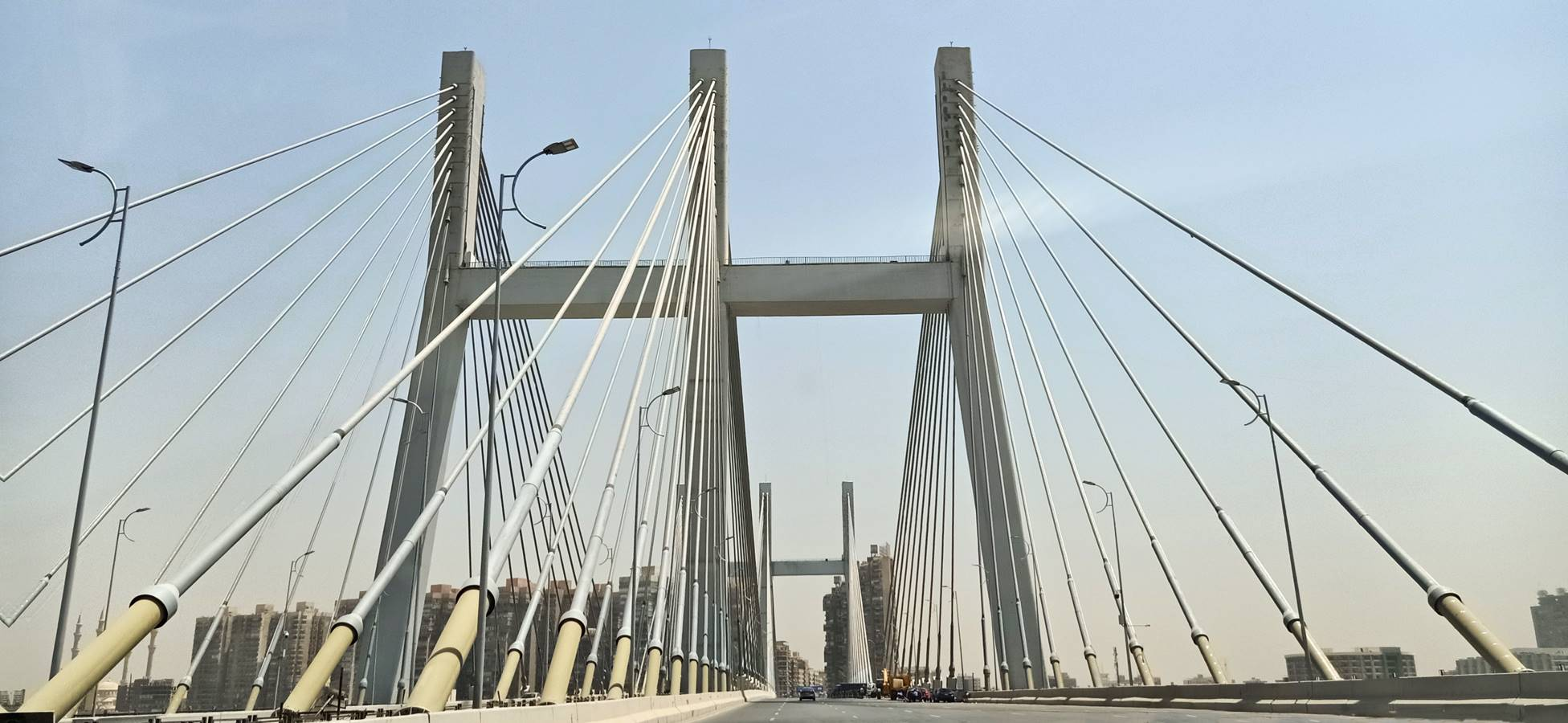
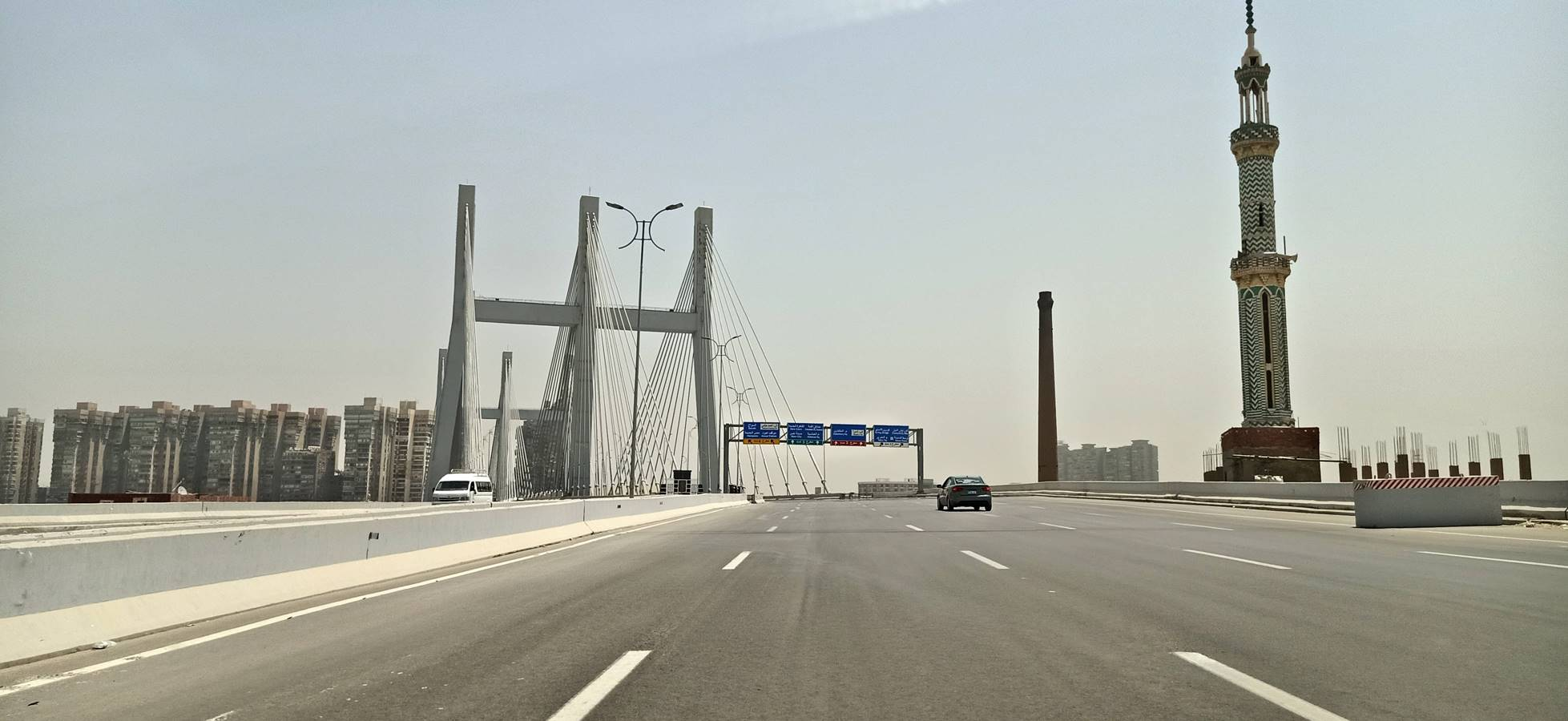
View of Tahya Misr Bridge in 2020.

The bridge was built over the course of four years; 4,000 individuals, including engineers, technicians, and other workers, took part in the construction. It was completed in 2019 and inaugurated by President Sisi. According to Ihab Alphar, the chairman of the AFEA, the basic cost of the project reached 170 billion Egyptian pounds (US$9.94 billion).

The bridge is 540 m (1,770 ft) meters long and has six lanes in each direction. Its suspension towers are 92 m (302 ft) high with 160 suspension cables.

The cable-stayed bridge width reaches 85 m (279 ft) at the eastern entrances, as the bridge width is increased to accommodate seven different entrance and exit ramps.

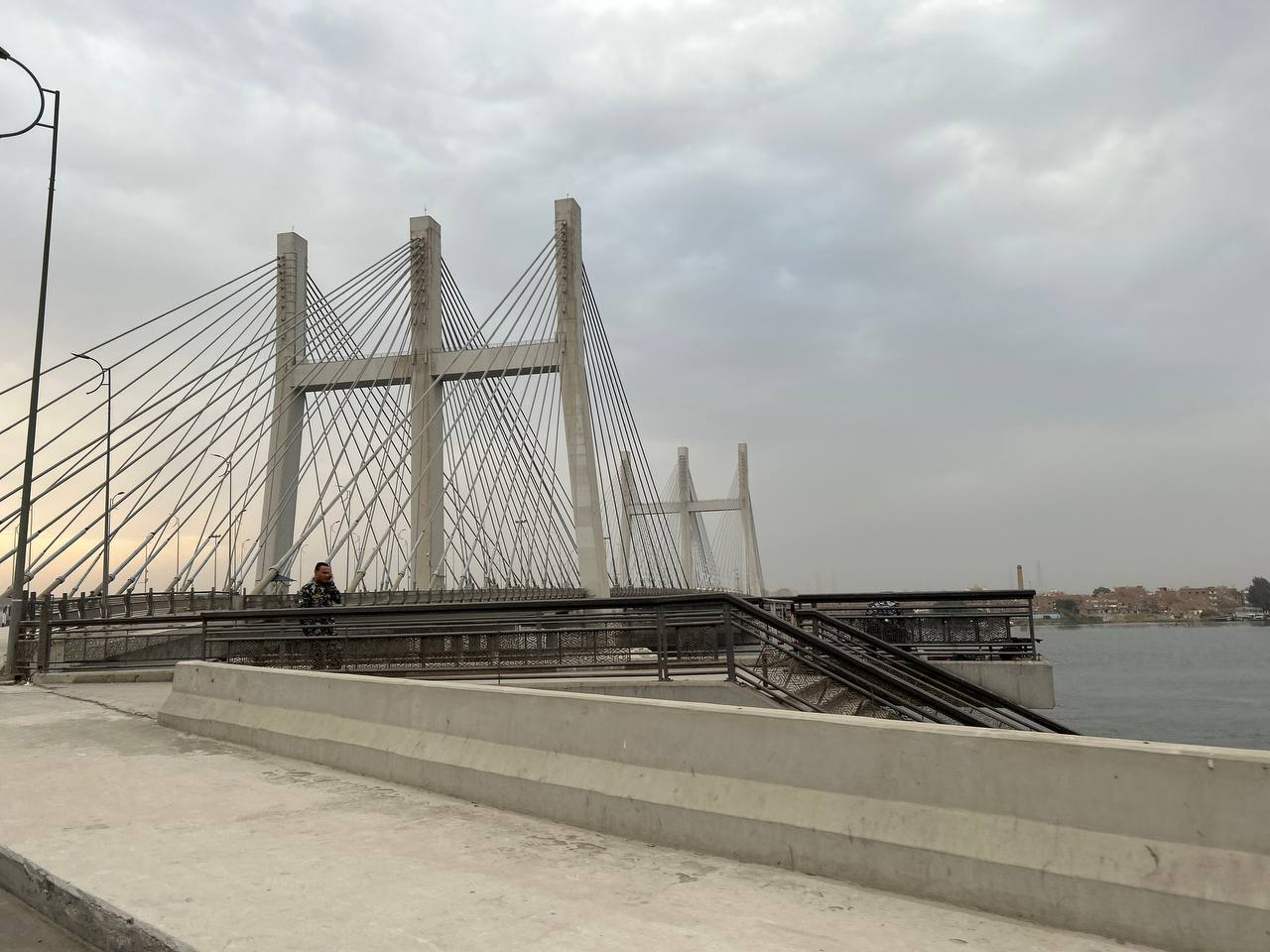
Side view

The bridge received PTI Award of Excellence in April 2021 from the Post-Tensioning Institute Design and Construction Supervision by ACE Consulting Engineers ( ACE Moharram Bakhoum ). Owner and Project Management EAAF.

== See also ==
- List of bridges
