= ACE Moharram Bakhoum =

Egyptian engineering company

- Type: Privately held company
- Industry: Engineering
- Founded: 1950; 76 years ago
- Founder: Ahmed Moharram and Michel Bakhoum
- Headquarters: Egypt
- Number of locations: Branches in 10 countries
- Area served: Worldwide (37 countries)
- Services: Engineering and Project Management
- Number of employees: 2,300
- Website: http://www.ace-mb.com/

ACE Moharram Bakhoum is a multi-disciplinary engineering and project management consultancy company, based in Egypt.

== Operations ==
The company operates in 37 countries, working on both private and publicly financed projects.

== History ==
ACE Moharram Bakhoum was established in 1950 as a private partnership between Ahmed Moharram and Michel Bakhoum. The first projects executed by the partners was a storage area for printing machines constructed in the basement of a building in Cairo, followed by the design of a pharmacological factory. In the 1950s, the partners made their entry into the field of bridge design, for which they later became widely known. By the 1970s, the company witnessed a regional expansion. In 1970, the first phase of the 6th of October Bridge was opened. This bridge, which is considered the main artery of the Egyptian capital, was the first prestressed concrete bridge to be entirely designed, constructed and the construction supervised by Egyptian firms. ACE Moharram Bakhoum was the designer and construction supervisor. By this time, ACE had been involved in numerous high-profile projects in Egypt and the Middle East region, and the expansion of its activities to include other disciplines was necessary. Currently, ACE Moharram Bakhoum is one of the largest engineering offices in Egypt. In 2020, ACE Moharram Bakhoum won the International Project of the Year Award by MEED for the Rod El Farag Cable Stayed Bridge, over the River Nile.

== Completed Projects ==
Examples of significant projects designed, managed, or supervised by ACE Moharram Bakhoum:

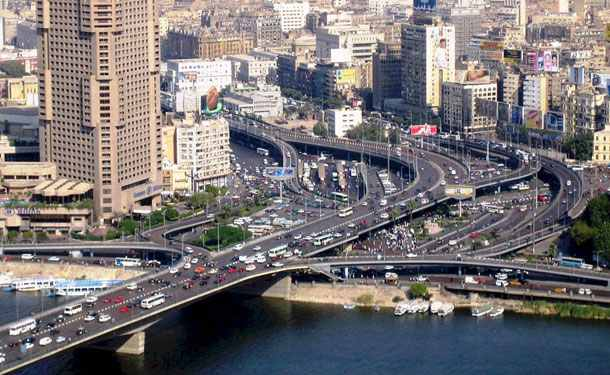
- 6th of October Bridge (the part crossing the Nile River)
  6th October Bridge
- Greater Cairo Metro Lines
- Rod el Farag Bridge, which won the Guinness Book of World Records’ certificate for being the world's widest cable-stayed bridge.
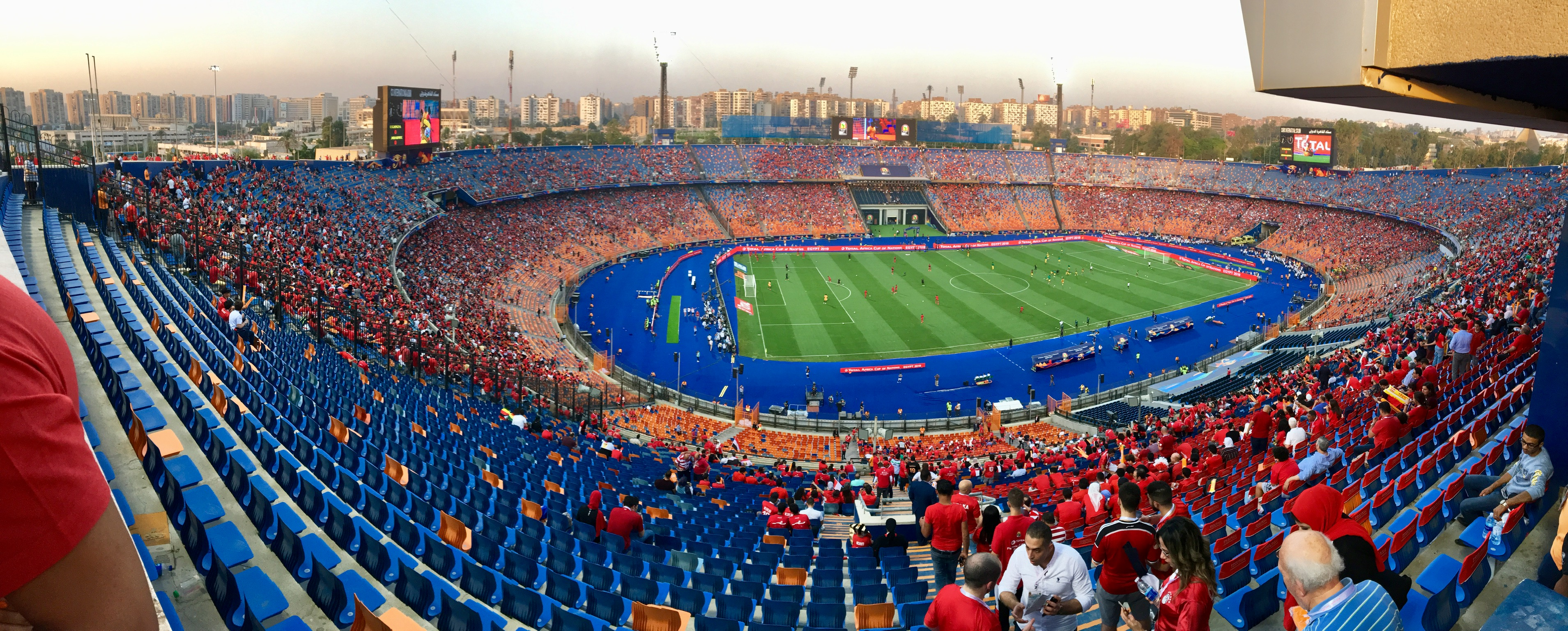
- Cairo International Stadium
  Luxor International Airport
- Cairo International Stadium
- Grand Egyptian Museum
- Sphinx float glass factory (1.2 Billion EGP project)
- Egyptian-German Telecommunication Plant
- Egyptian Cement Company Plant
- Alexandria light rail line modernisation
