= El-Mokawloon =

El Mokawloon may refer to:

- El-Mokawloon El-Arab (company), an Egyptian contracting firm established by the prominent civil engineer Osman Ahmed Osman
- El Mokawloon SC, an Egyptian football club owned by the contracting company
