= Gezira (Cairo) =

Island in the Nile River, in Cairo, Egypt

Gezira الجزيره
- District

Egyptian Arabic transcription(s)
  - Common: El-Gezira
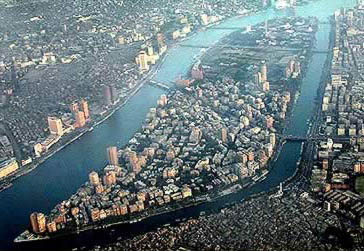
- Aerial view of Gezira Island looking south, with the Zamalek district, surrounded by the Nile.

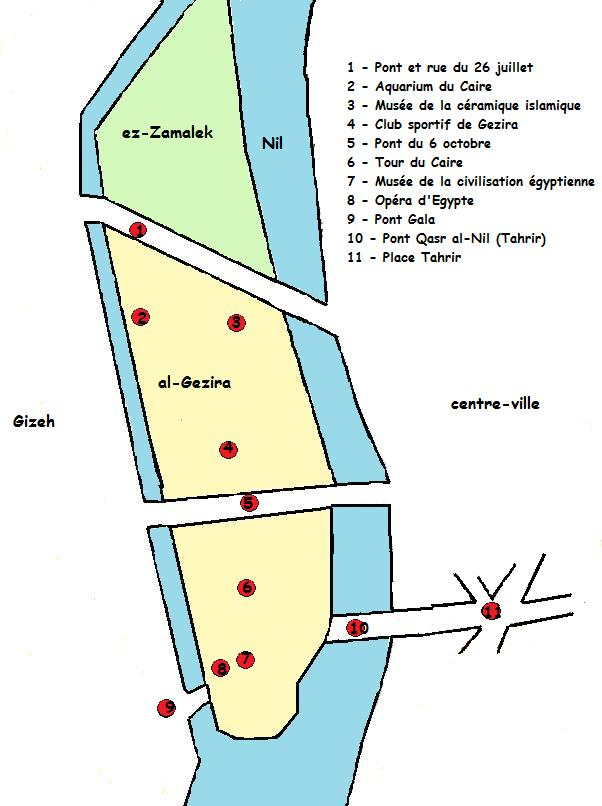
- Map of Gezira
- Country: Egypt
- Governorate: Cairo
- Time zone: UTC+2 (EET)
  - Summer (DST): UTC+3 (EEST)

Gezira is an island in the Nile, in central Cairo, Egypt. The southern portion of the island contains the Gezira district, and the northern third contains the Zamalek district. Gezira is the Egyptian Arabic word for island. Gezira is west of downtown Cairo and Tahrir Square, connected across the Nile by four bridges each on the east and west sides, the Qasr El Nil Bridge, 15 May Bridge, Al-Gala'a Bridge and 6th October Bridge.

Under 19th century ruler Khedive Ismail the island was first called "Jardin des Plantes" (French for "Garden of Plants"), because of its great collection of exotic plants shipped from all over the world.

== Landmarks ==
The Egyptian Opera House from the Cairo Tower on the Gezira Island

- Cairo Tower (1960), the tallest concrete structure in Egypt, built near the Gezira Sporting Club.
- Egyptian Opera House (1988), built near the Cairo Tower.
- El Sawy Culture Wheel Centre (2003) (Arabic: ساقية الصاوى), located beneath 15 May Bridge in Zamalek, one of the most important cultural venues in Egypt.
- Gezira Sporting Club (1882), the oldest club in Egypt.
- Al Ahly SC main branch, founded in 1907 by Omar Lotfi as a gathering place for student unions against the British Occupation.

== Education ==
Schools on the island include:

- Lycée Français du Caire Zamalek Primary Campus
- Pakistan International School Cairo in Zamalek
- Previously, the British International School in Cairo (BISC) in Zamalek

== Sports ==
Gezira Island is home to the basketball club Al Gezira Cairo, 2017 Champion of the Egyptian Basketball Super League.

Al Ahly SC is located on Gezira island.

The 1947 Grand Prix motor racing series included the Gezira Grand Prix, the only Grand Prix race staged in Egypt.

== Gallery ==
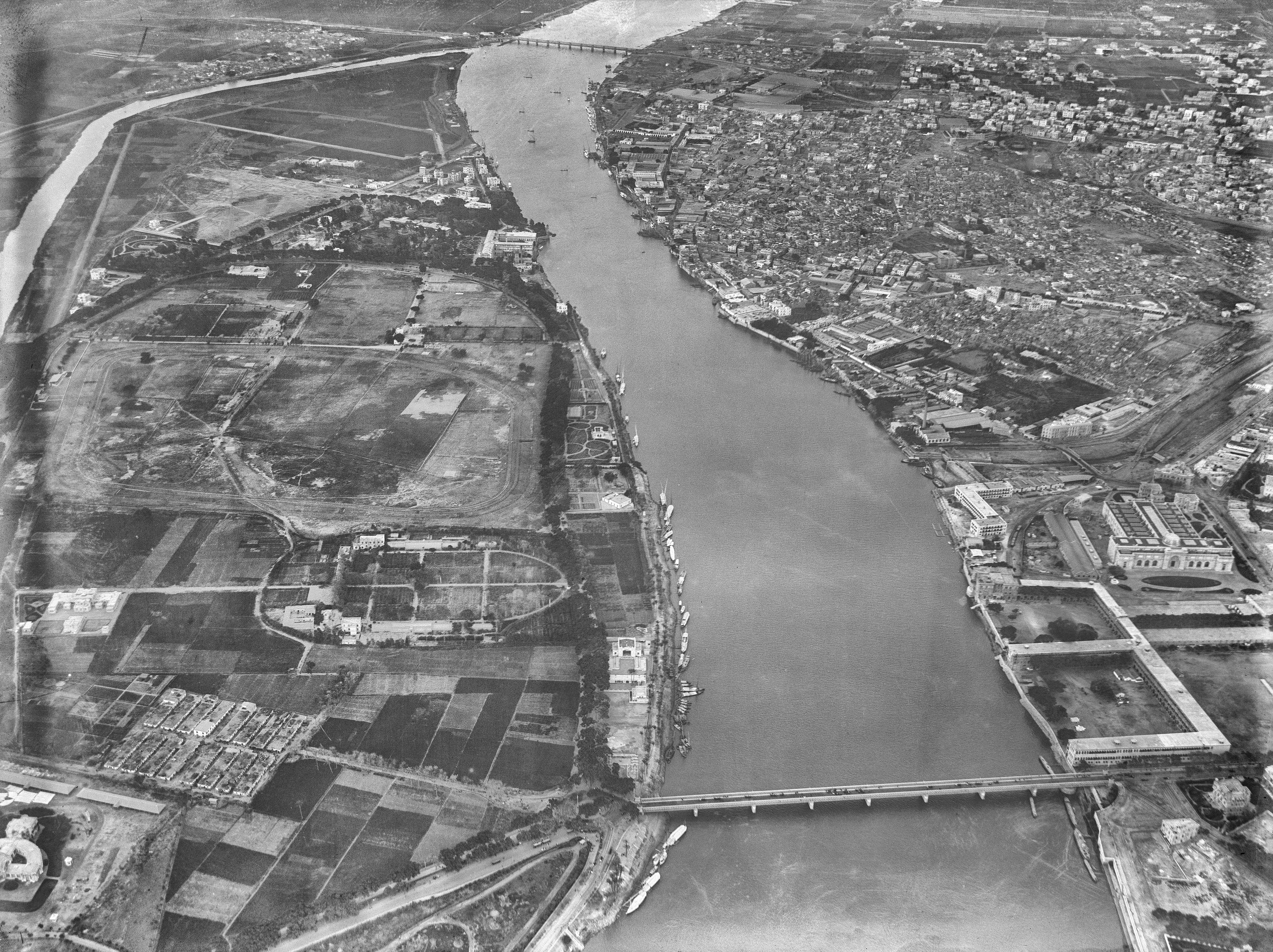
Gezira (on the left) in 1904

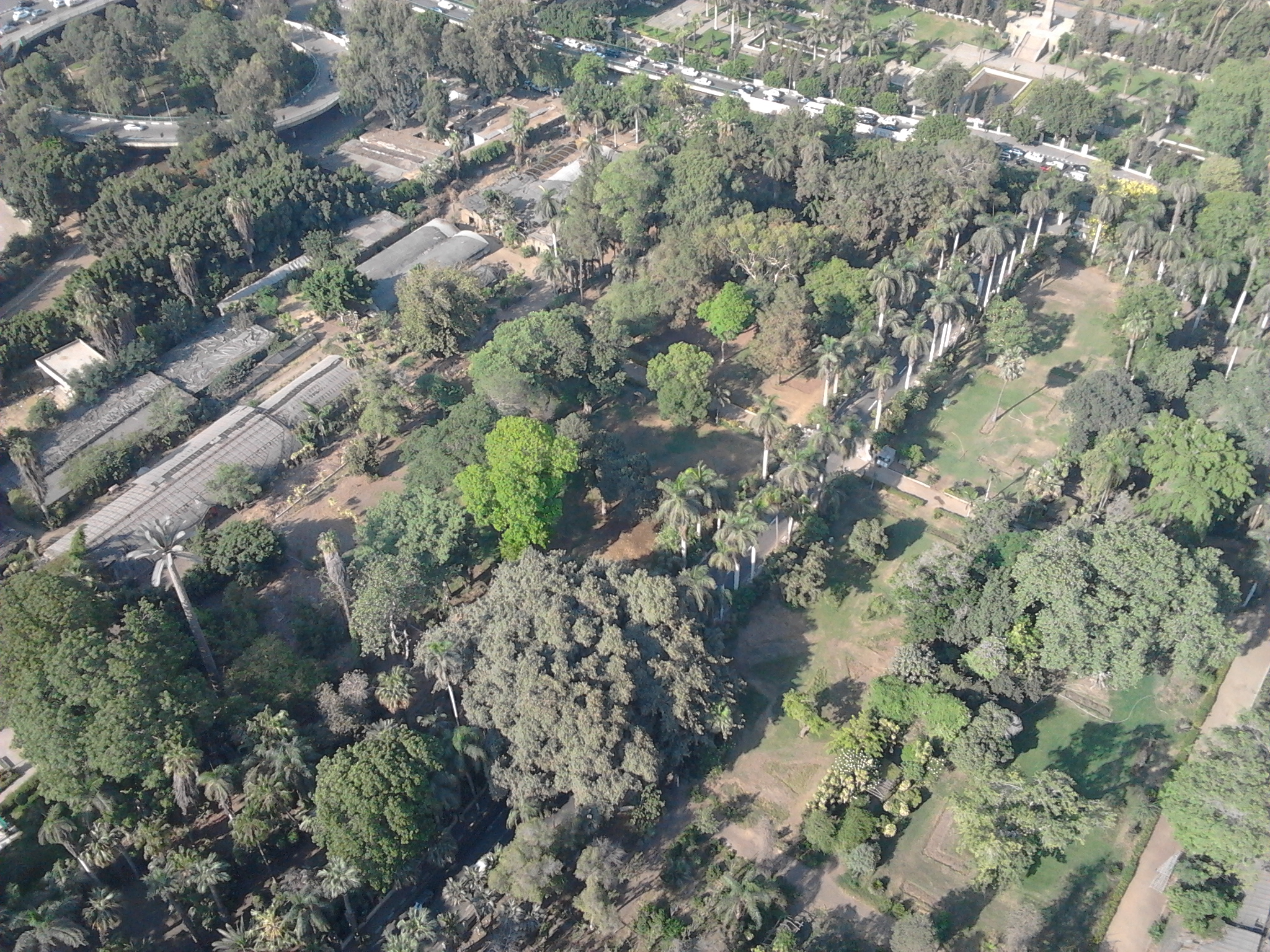
El Gezira Gardens

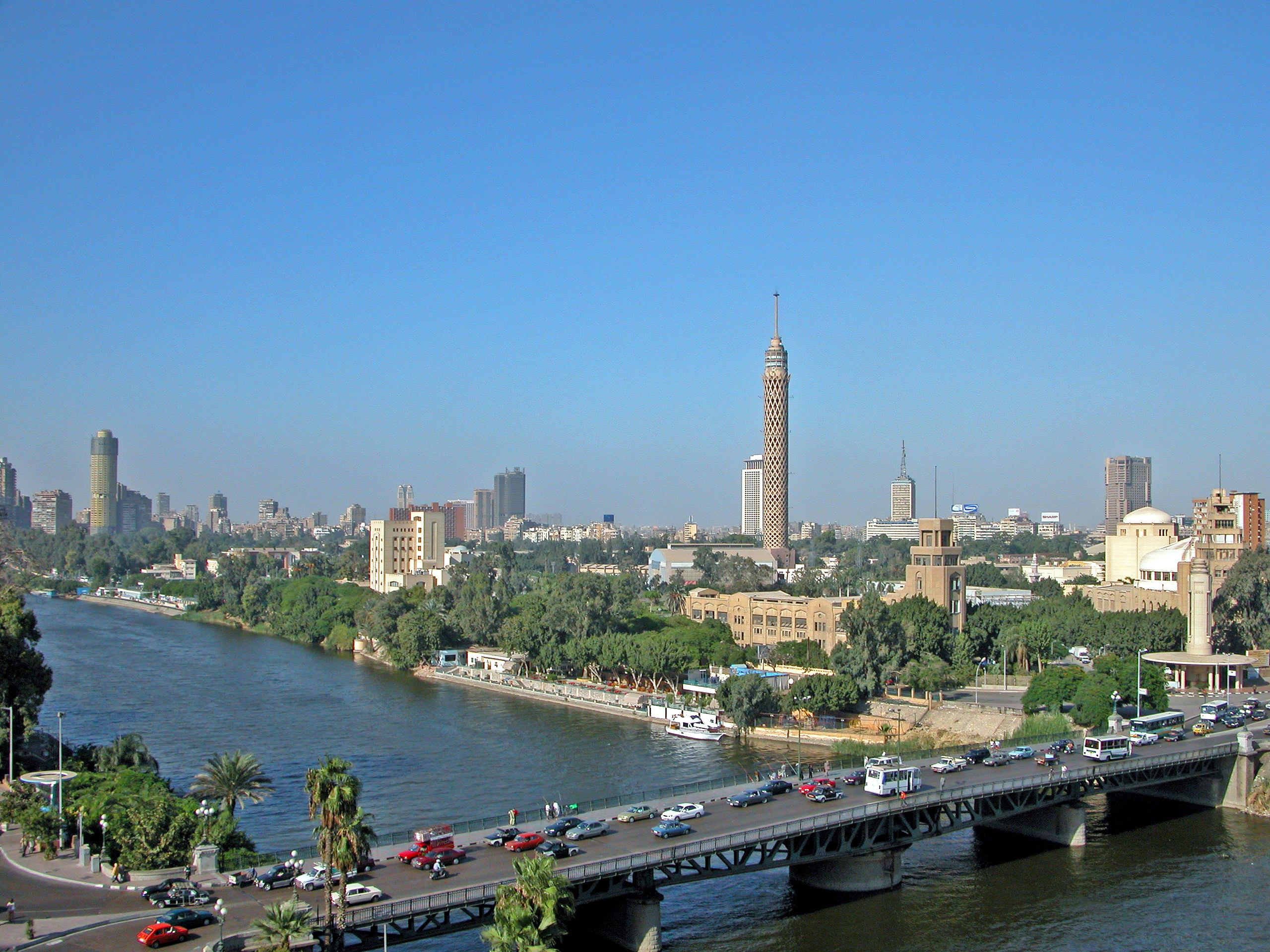
Cairo Tower with Al-Gala Bridge

Southern tip of Gezira Island

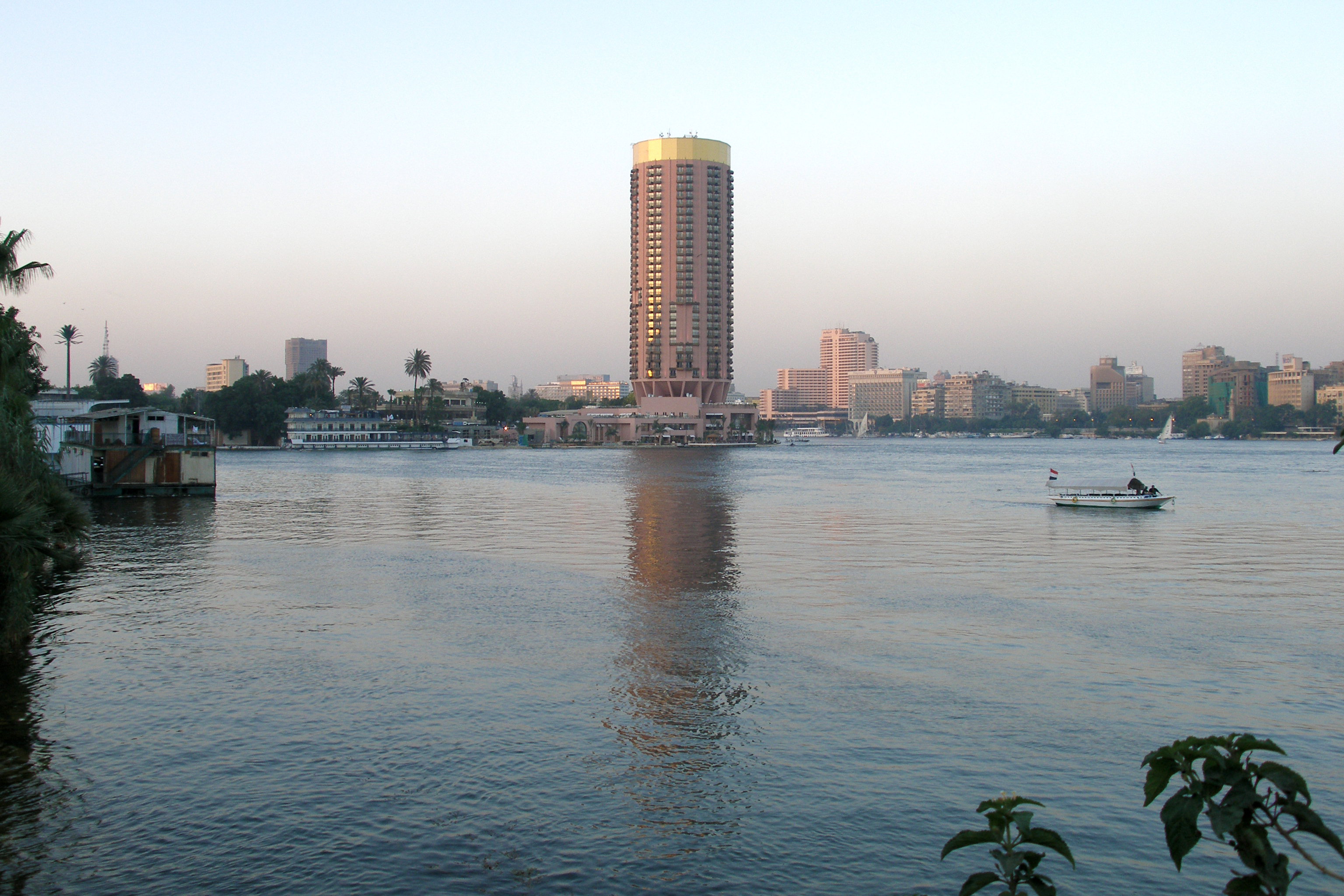
El Gezira Tower

== See also ==
- Zamalek district
