= Shubra =

District of Cairo, Egypt

Coordinates: 30°04′21″N 31°14′27″E

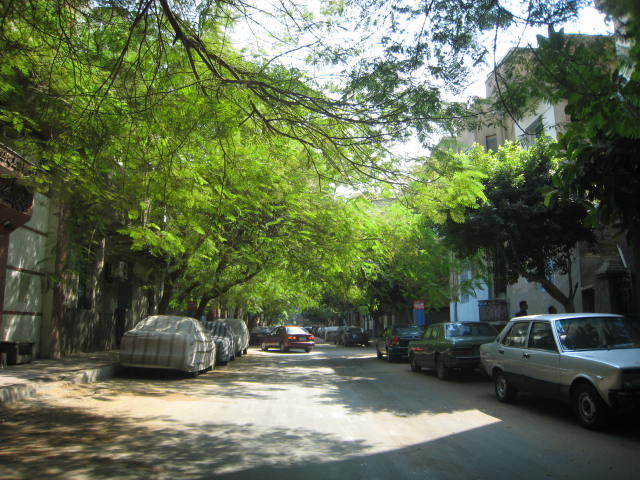
El-Gesr Street in Shubra, Cairo. This street, like many others throughout Shubra's neighborhoods, is almost entirely covered with trees.

Shubra (Arabic: شبرا, IPA: [ˈʃobɾɑ]; also written Shoubra or Shobra) is a district of Cairo, Egypt and it is one of eight districts that make up the Northern Area. Administratively it used to cover the entire area of the three districts of Shubra, Rod El Farag, and El Sahel, until it was broken up in 1988. Therefore, many places associated with the original, larger Shubra are known as belonging to it, even though administratively they lie in one of the other two districts.

The larger Shubra is historically related to the city of Shubra El Kheima, although in the Qalyubiyya Governorate immediately to the north of Shubra, and contiguous to it.

== Etymology ==
Although Shubra is a large city district, the name originally derives from the Coptic word ϭⲱⲡⲣⲟ Šopro, which means a small village, kom (hill), or hamlet, as the area was well known for its rich fields that neighbour the Nile River before it became a part of Cairo. Shubra is a common prefix for many places in Egypt, most of which originated as villages but may today be towns or even cities. For example, the villages of Shubra Bekhoum, Quesna, Menoufia, and Shubra Beloula, Qutour, Gharbia, or Qalyubia's industrial city, Shubra El Kheima.

== History ==
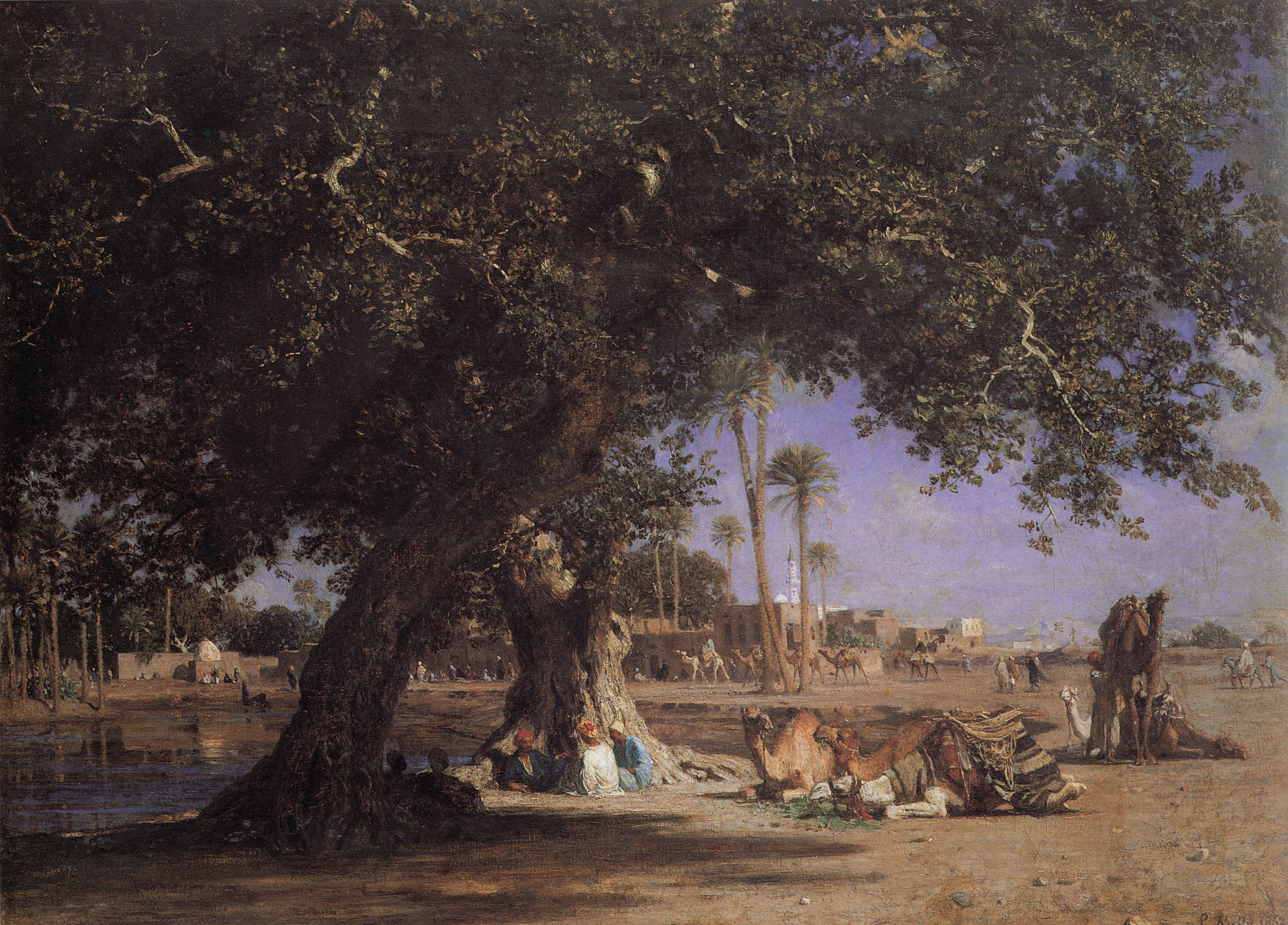
A view of Shubra in 1862 by Léon Belly.

Muhammad Ali chose the fields around the then village of Shubra El-Kheima for the location of a rural retreat where he built himself a palace in the area overlooking the Nile and extended Shubra Street in 1808 from Bab al-Hadid in Cairo, to there. A 'Fountain Pavilion' (kushk al-fasqia), nicknamed by French historians as the Nymphaeum, would be added to the palace gardens by 1821. Over the coming decades Mohamed Ali's heirs would turn the area into a garden suburb lining Shubra Street with their palaces.

During the 20th Century, Shubra developed from cultivated fields and palatial gardens into a residential area. The area around the Shubra El-Kheima village north of the intake of the Ismailia Canal, would become the city of Shubra El-Kheima in the Qalubia governorate. While the area south of the canal and north of Bulaq called Dawahi Masr (Cairo's Suburbs) would become the larger Shubra district of Cairo. Shubra lost its upper-class status slowly after the tramway was built in 1902 connecting it to the rest of Cairo, turning into a cosmopolitan working-class and merchant middle-class neighbourhood with numerous cinemas and theatres.

The tram was removed in the 1990s as Cairo Metro Line 2 was being dug, and today the only remaining palatial buildings are the Fountain Pavilion in Shubra El-Kheima, erroneously named Mohamed Ali's Palace, and prince Omar Tousson's palace that was converted into a public school in the 1950s, then later abandoned and is now in the Rod al-Farag district.

The Sard Shubra Archive was established in 2021 to preserve histories of Shubra through ephemeral materials including tram tickets, images of historic churches and concert halls, film posters, and legal documents. Sard is housed in the family apartment of founder Mina Ibrahim, an anthropology researcher from Shubra, and registered with the Egyptian Ministry of Internal Trade.

== Modern Shubra ==
The present-day Shubra district is the smaller of the three districts that make up the original Shubra, and is bounded from the west by Shubra Street and the Rod al-Farag district, the south by the Ramses Station (Ban al-Hadid) and train yards, and from the west by Ahmed Hilmi Street and the Sharabiya district, and to the north by Khulusi Street and al-Sahel district. It had an estimated 76,695 residents in 2017.

Greater Shubra has the highest concentration of Coptic Christians in Cairo. There are several churches throughout the district's neighborhoods, such as the decades-old Church of St. Mary in Massarra and St. George, El-Geushi.

Shubra is served by Cairo Metro Line 2, with stations all located under the main Shubra street. There are a large number of mosques in Shubra. One of the most renowned mosques in Shubra is el Khazen Dar (Hazindar) mosque, which is named after an occupation at the time of the Ottoman Empire.

== Administrative subdivisions ==
Shubra is sub-divided into four shiakhas (smallest census blocks) that do not have any administrative duties:

- Al-Tir'a al-Bûlâqiyya
- Al-Shamâshirgî
- Al-Attâr
- Gisr Shubrâ

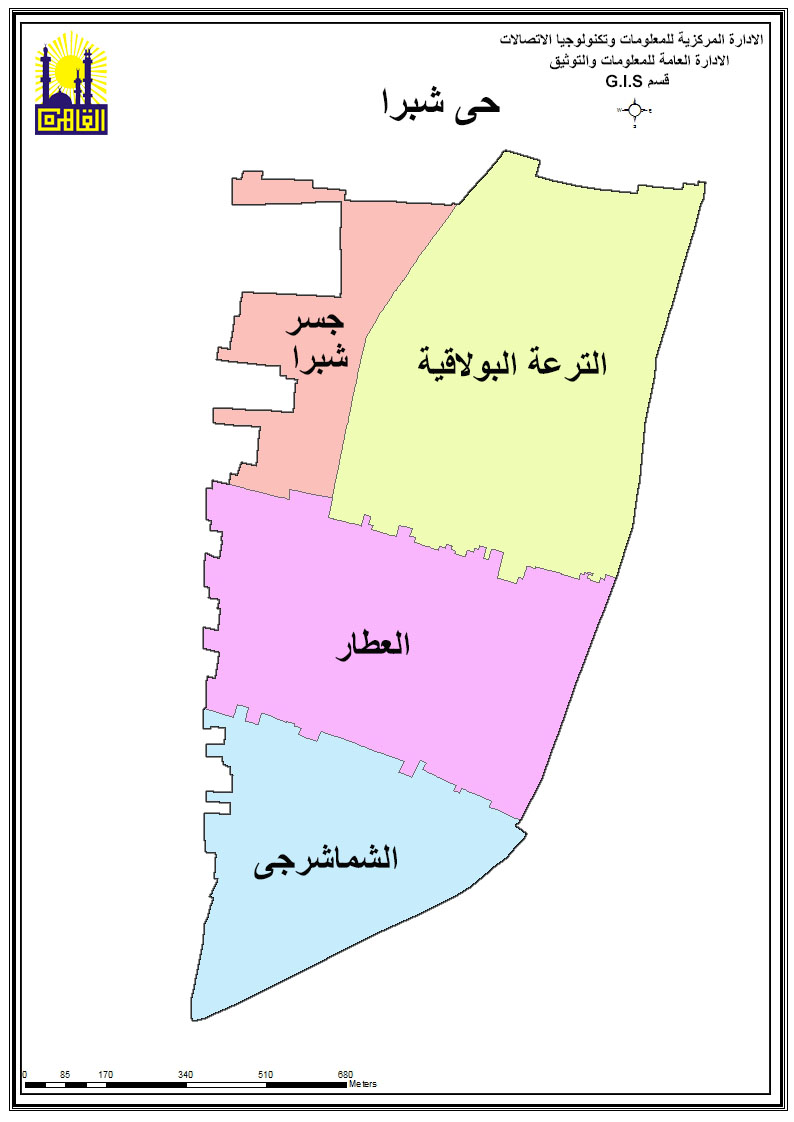
Cairo Governorate Shubra District map, subdivided by shiakha.

== Notable residents ==
- In the 1940s and 1950s, Nazir Gayyed (before becoming Pope Shenouda III of Alexandria in 1971) was notable in serving the Coptic Orthodox communities in the district of Shubra, particularly Saint Antonious Church in Shubra.
- Bishop Moussa, Bishop of Youth, attended and served the churches in Shubra before being a monk.
- Bishop Raphael, General Bishop of down town Cairo, attended and served the churches in Shubra before being a monk.
- Bishop Youssef, was also attending and serving Saint Antonious Church in Shubra, before joining St. Mary Monastery (EL-Sorian) as a monk.
- Father Raphael Ava Mina (candidate of the 2012 Papacy elections) used to live in Shubra (Gezerat Badran).
- Dalida, a famous French-Egyptian-Italian singer was born in Shubra in 1933.
- Suad Nasr, Egyptian actress.
- Milad Hanna, professor, writer and political activist.
