= El Sahel =

District in Cairo, Egypt

Coordinates: 30°05′05″N 31°14′32″E

El-Sahel of Cairo (Arabic: الساحل IPA: [esˈsæːħel, elˈ-]) is a district in the Northern Area of Cairo, Egypt. It used to form part of a larger district of Shubra that was established as a garden suburb of Cairo in the 19th century until it was subdivided in 1988 into the districts of al-Sahel (the northern half of old Shubra from Khulusi Street to the south to the Ismailia Canal to the North), Rod El Farag (the south western quarter), and Shubra (the south eastern quarter).

== History ==
The history of al-Sahel is largely the history of Shubra, where many places that are generally referred to as in Shubra, are today, administratively in Al-Sahel district such as Mohamed Ali's Shubra Pavilion.

=== Modern landmarks ===
Al-Sahel hosts two of Cairo's largest hospitals: Nasser Institute for Search and Treatment Hospital, and the older Al-Sahel Teaching Hospital, which is named after the area. Additionally, al-Sahel is home to a date market.
