= Osman Ahmed Osman =

Egyptian engineer

Osman Ahmed Osman عثمان احمد عثمان
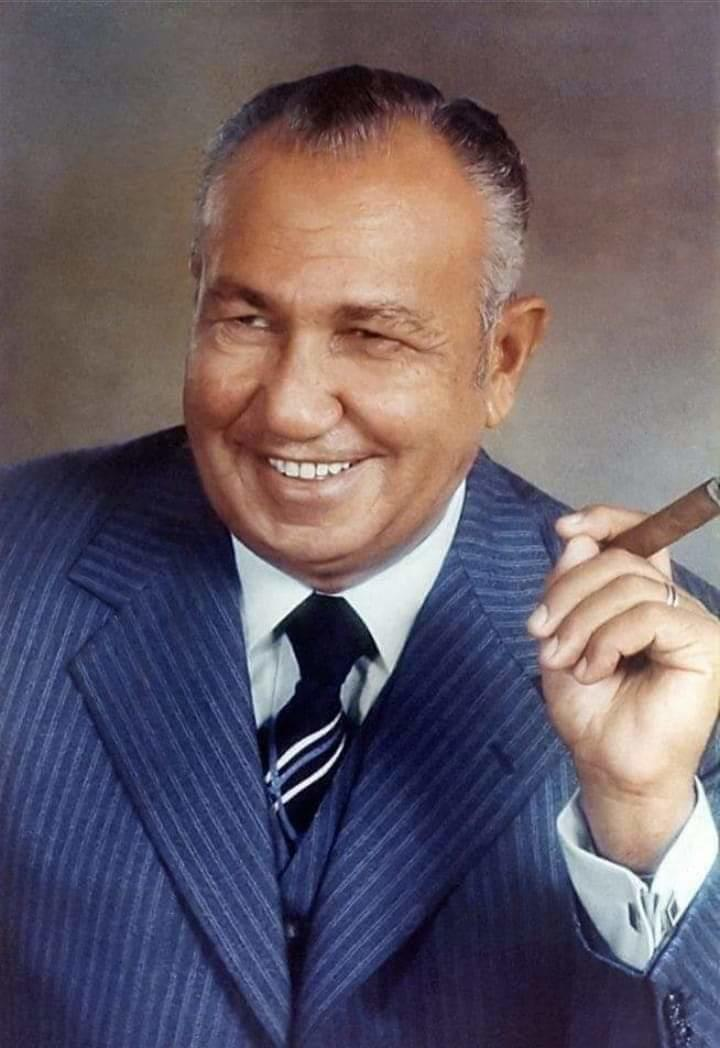
- Born: April 6, 1917; Ismailia, Sultanate of Egypt
- Died: 1 May 1999 (aged 82); Cairo, Egypt
- Education: Cairo University
- Occupation: Chairman of Arab Contractors
- Website: http://www.arabcont.com/

Osman Ahmed Osman (Arabic: عثمان أحمد عثمان) (April 6, 1917 – april 30 1999) was an Egyptian engineer, contractor, entrepreneur, and politician. Known commonly as el-mo'alim ("the boss") and Abu El-Ismailia (father of the city Ismailia), for building the majority of Egypt, (founded the Arab Contractors (the largest Arab contracting firm in the whole of the Middle East and the world, between the 1960s and 1980s) and led the Egyptian effort to build the Aswan Dam. He went on to become the Egyptian Minister of Housing and Development and later a member of the Egyptian Parliament; he also continued to be one of the wealthiest and most powerful men in the world.

== Early life ==
Osman was born on April 6, 1917, in the town of Ismailia in Egypt. Osman was born to an impoverished family, whose situation was made worse after his father died in 1920, when Osman was three years old. His eldest brother, Mohamed, dropped out of school to provide a steady income to support the family. As a child, Osman himself often had to work to supply additional income.

Upon completing his schoolwork, Osman moved to Cairo to pursue a degree in Civil Engineering. Unable to afford tuition, rent, or even public transportation, Osman improvised: he received a scholarship from Cairo University, lived with his older sister, and commuted on a bike he had assembled himself. Osman excelled and graduated in 1940 with a bachelor's degree in Civil Engineering. He then returned to his hometown, Ismailia. He worked with his maternal uncle, an illiterate but savvy contractor, for 18 months.

== Osman's dream ==
Osman's dream was to build a large, successful contracting firm. At the time, all such firms operating in the Middle East were European. After only 18 months of work experience, Osman founded Osman Ahmed Osman, Engineer & Contractor, which would later become the Arab Contractors. His startup capital was E£180 he had saved up from his earlier job. Osman was the only owner and employee. He operated out of a small one-room office and undertook various small projects, such as building small shops and garages, repairing buildings. The company grew and his operations expanded, but he struggled to compete with foreign firms for larger-scale projects. He began to undertake larger projects, such as erecting an all-girls school and a theater, and eventually expanded his operations to Cairo.

== Osman's success in the Arab countries ==
In 1950, Osman traveled to Saudi Arabia. The Persian Gulf area was experiencing a huge boom in the construction sector, largely related to the oil boom. Osman was able to take advantage of this, and within a short period of time was carrying out multibillion-dollar projects in Kuwait, Libya, Iraq, and the UAE, amassing a great deal of wealth. Osman mentions that in most of these countries, he found the construction markets dominated by monopolies and cartels of foreign companies.

In 1956, Osman returned to Egypt. By this time, the Egyptian revolution, led by Gamal Abdel Nasser, had taken place. Osman returned with a bang, winning a $48 million contract for Nasser's pet project, the Aswan Dam. However, Osman's entrepreneurial style was not compatible with Nasser's socialist revolution. Despite this, the Arab Contractors continue to thrive in Egypt, since Nasser's confrontational strategy with Israel required construction such as bunkers, airports, missile silos, etc.

In 1961, Nasser's regime fully nationalized the Arab Contractors. Osman was abroad at the time, and faced a choice of whether to return, or continue pursuing his wealth abroad. Osman returned to Egypt, claiming that he felt it his duty to his country and his employees. Osman pledged that the company would continue to operate at the same level regardless of who it was owned by, which seemed difficult at the time. Osman had practiced a wage-incentive program within his company, which would be illegal for any public sector company. However, after his success at the Aswan Dam project, Nasser allowed Osman to continue running the company, and a special law was passed to allow public sector companies, that did a substantial part of their business abroad (which was the case for the company), to be able to flexibly determine wages and incentives.

== Osman thrives under Sadat ==
Nasser's death in 1970 came as a shock for the country. However, Osman welcomed Sadat as a breath of fresh air. Osman and Sadat had been friends for several years. Osman was highly critical of Nasser's policies and believed that the Egyptian people had paid a high prices for Nasser's combination of domestic repression and foreign adventurism.

In 1973, Sadat launched the October War. Again, the Arab Contractors played a role; the company built the ferries that carried Egyptian forces across the Suez canal.

== Osman the politician ==
Politically, Osman was a staunch supporter of President Anwar Al Sadat. Like Sadat, Osman believed in capitalism, free-market principles, and open-door policies with trade, with certain restrictions. He believed that the private sector should be allowed to thrive; only certain sectors, like utilities, should be public. He denounced Nasser's socialist agenda as merely a ploy to gain support of the masses. For example, Nasser guaranteed jobs for all university graduates. Osman said that this policy was a trick to gain support of the people, but that the policy itself was not sustainable or practical. In his book, he warns graduates from accepting the default government position, saying that the government would not be able to provide such a large number of jobs. Osman argued that the "owner of any private project is interested in expanding it along with his wealth, and expansion of the project can only mean increased production and job opportunities".

Like Sadat, Osman also believed that it was in Egypt's (and the region's) best interest to try and tackle the Israeli-Palestine conflict diplomatically. Osman believed that by doing so, the Arab countries would be able to win over the rest of the world. Osman accompanied Sadat on his visit to Israel in 1977 to speak at the Knesset.

Osman believed that for developing a country, business and economic development were a form of national duty far more important than many political issues.

== Philosophy and management style ==
Despite having no formal managerial training, Osman proved to be an excellent leader. Osman stressed the importance of keeping employees happy, secure, and comfortable as a way to increase productivity. Many of these ideas emerged in the Arab Contractors, but would later be implemented at a national level. For example, Osman led the first effort in Egypt to set up employee pension funds, as well as medical insurance. These were first implemented for Arab Contractors employees, but later expanded to encompass all government employees.

Osman felt that if he could solve day-to-day employee problems, employees would be more focused on their work and more loyal. Osman would often provide free transportation, food, and medical care for his employees. During the Aswan Dam erection, Osman set up a hospital, a school, a park, etc. for the thousands of employees that were relocated to Aswan. These would later serve as a model for the Arab Contractors Medical Facility and the Arab Contractors Technical Institute.

Osman believed strongly in the power of personal relationships. In his autobiography, Osman mentions his belief that a leader must pursue two types of relationships. Firstly, one must maintain strong and positive relationships internally, within the company. Also, one must create external relationships outside the company. Osman believed both could be accomplished by treating those around him well, and practicing a strong work-ethic. High-quality work would serve as excellent marketing. Osman was an avid networker, and practiced his philosophy within the company, within Egypt, and even within the entire Middle East. Osman maintained personal relationships with officials (even heads-of-state) in any country in which he operated.

== Criticism ==
Critics of Osman tend to be critics of Sadat, arguing that Osman exploited his close relationship with Sadat to gain political power and financial success. Osman and Sadat were known to be close friends, from even before Sadat's presidency. Osman and Sadat had very similar views, and were neighbors in El Haram Giza. Osman's eldest son, Mahmoud Osman, married Sadat's youngest daughter, Jihan (Nana) Al Sadat, further solidifying the tie.

Osman, as one of Sadat's close friends and political allies, was subjected to much criticism, most of which was ultimately aimed at Sadat. It is said that Osman was the second most powerful man in Egypt during Sadat's presidency. Defenders of Osman argue that he amassed most of his wealth during the Nasser presidency, mostly outside of Egypt (in other Arab countries). In fact, they argue, most of Osman's wealth was invested in the Arab Contractors, which was nationalized by Nasser. Critics point out that Osman remained in control of the Arab Contractors, even after nationalization (a rare occurrence under Nasser's regime), and that he kept key familial allies and friend in top positions in the company, ultimately remaining in control, and using that control to leverage other business endeavors.

== Later life ==
Osman Ahmed Osman died in 1999. He suffered from several medical conditions in the last decade of his life, include heart problems and Alzheimer's disease.

== Legacy ==
The Arab Contractors still remains one of the largest construction companies in Egypt and the Middle East . However, its ties to the Osman family were severed in 2001 when the last member of the family, Ismail Osman, was removed from his CEO position by the government . At the time, the company was suffering severe financial problems, including a massive debt (the nation as a whole was suffering a liquidity crisis). Ismail Osman argued that the problems were a result of the government's refusal to pay its debts to the Arab Contractors, while demanding more work from the company on government projects: "The government owes us money, and we owe the banks money, yet the state does not pay us the interest on our late payments to the banks. It is not the fault of the company. It is the fault of the overall system."

The company still bears the Osman Ahmed Osman name. The company's football club's stadium was renamed Osman Ahmed Osman Stadium following his death. One of the main avenues in downtown Ismailia is named after Osman.

The Osman Group is a group of companies privately owned by members of the Osman family. It was founded in 1974, and today is owned / run by Osman Ahmed Osman's four sons - Mahmoud, Ibrahim, Ahmed, and Mohamed. The companies mostly operate in construction-derived areas, but also agriculture, information technology, etc.

== Daly TV Show ==
In Ramadan 2007, a TV series featuring Nour Al-Sherif was aired on Arabic satellite channels. Many people drew parallels between the main character of the show (Saad El-Daly), and Osman Ahmed Osman, but the creators of the show have denied basing that character on Osman. The Osman family was reportedly unhappy with the show, claiming that the show drew on Osman's early life and rise from poverty into success, while showing the main character as a corrupt, greedy, crime-linked tycoon after his success.
