= Rod El Farag =

Human settlement in Egypt

Coordinates: 30°04′34″N 31°14′23″E

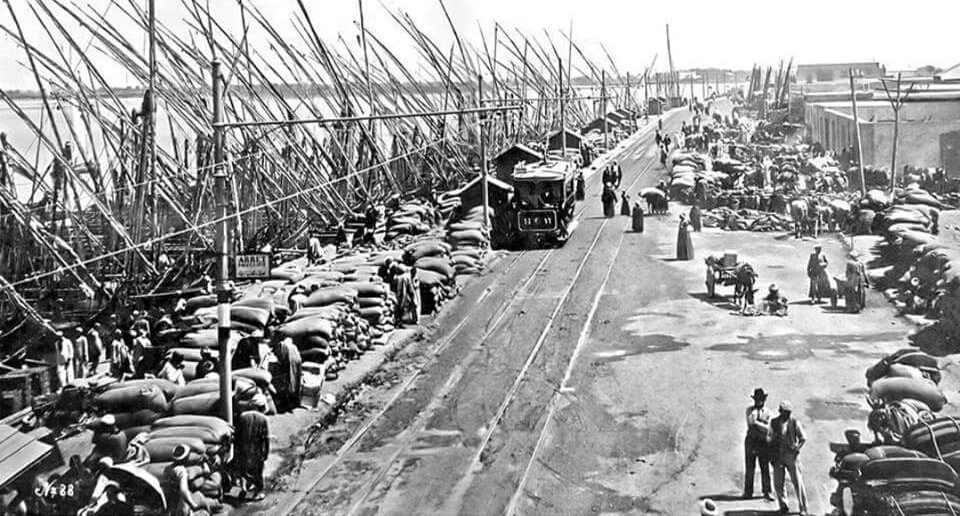
Old Rod El Farag

Rod El Farag (Arabic: روض الفرج, Arabic pronunciation: [ɾoːd elˈfɑɾɑɡ]; also spelled Rawd al-Farag, or Road El-Farag) is a district in the Northern Area of Cairo, Egypt. Rod El Farag neighbours the River Nile to the west, Bulaq district to the south, Shubra district to the east and al-Sahel district to the north.

== History ==
Rod El Farag started to be cultivated in the 19th century, after changes in the Nile course resulted in the accumulation of silt after the annual floods, north of Bulaq creating permanent land. Late-19th-century and early-20th-century maps show the village of Rod al-Farag al-Qadim, and water works and docks by the Nile. As Cairo expanded north, Rod al-Farag became a sub-district of the growing Shubra suburb by the mid-20th century, becoming known for alternative open-air theatres, bars and night clubs after World War Two where the careers of many contemporary actors were launched. They included Nagib al-Rīḥānī, ʿAlī al-Kassār, Fāṭima Rushdī, Mohamed Shukūkū, Ismaʿīl Yāsīn, Āmīna Rizq, and Marī Mūnīb.

== Wholesale market ==
In 1947, a large vegetable and fruit wholesale market was built in Rod El Farag, its economy employing many of the district's residents as traders or carriers. The market, and Rod al-Farag in general, was a central character in the 1957 film Al-Fetewa (The Thug) portraying daily struggles in the market. Eventually the market was relocated in 1996 near the new town of Obour on the outskirts of Cairo, and was renamed after it, while its original location has since hosted a public garden, schools and a 'cultural palace' (public cultural centre).

== Other points of interest ==
The world-famous El-Nozah candy shop, started in 1940. was famous for its home-made ice cream, though it relocated to an area on the outskirts of Greater Cairo.

This district also contains good infrastructure, including the French school "Notre Dame des Apotres.

== Rod El Farag Bridge ==
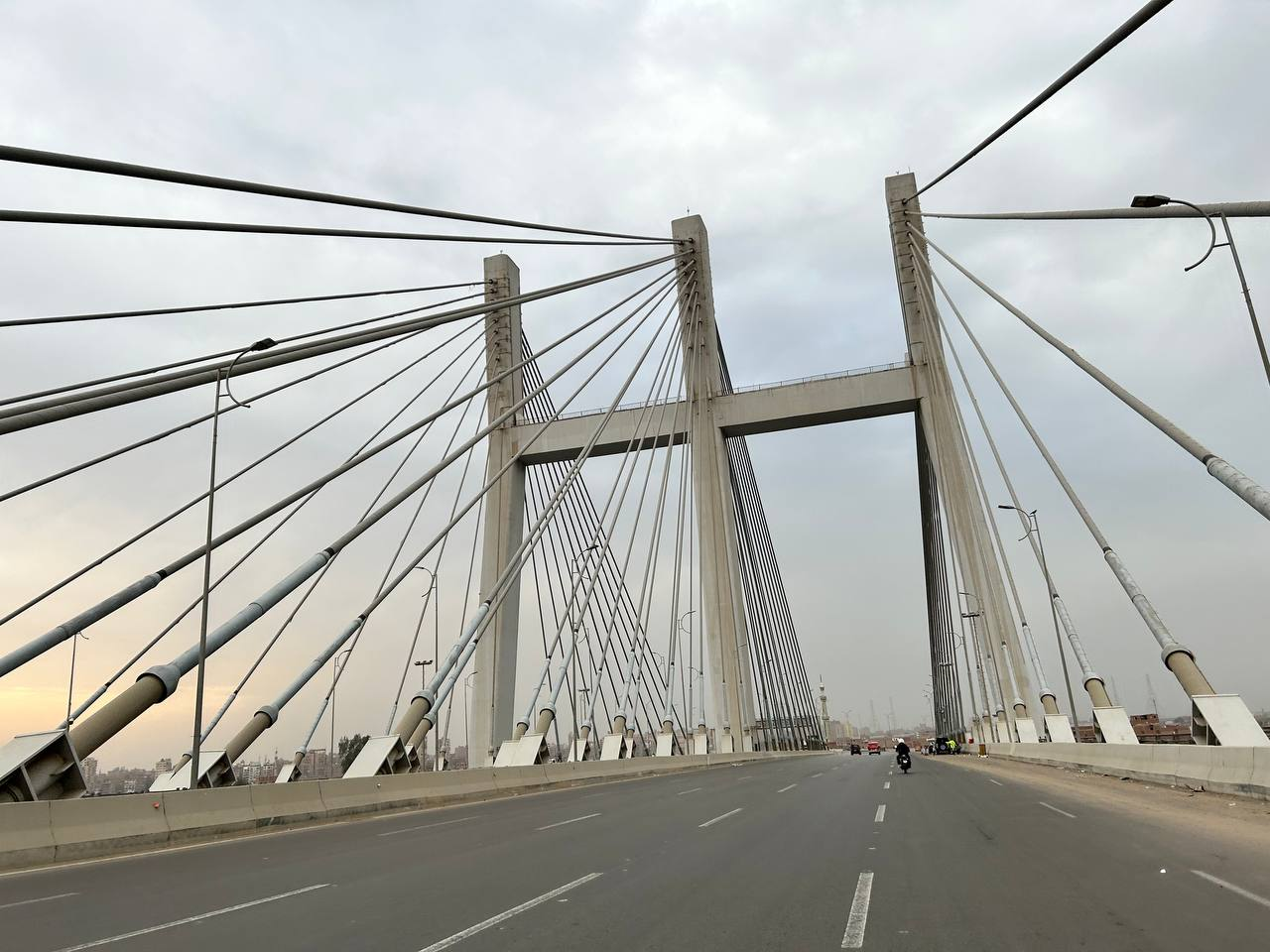
Tahya Misr Bridge

The Rod El Farag Bridge over the Nile river, which is part of the Tahya Misr Axis crossing the Egyptian capital of Cairo, built by the Egyptian company Arab Contractors, is the world's widest cable-stayed bridge built over the course of 4 years until it was completed in 2019, achieving the Guinness World Record with a width of 67.3 meters. The 540 meters long bridge has 6 lanes in each direction, has suspension towers which are 92 meters high and 160 suspension cables to hold the bridge. Currently, it is becoming a major tourist attraction in Cairo, where visitors can cross the side pedestrian passageways which have panoramic views of the banks of the Nile and a glass floor see-through walkway where visitors can walk over the Nile.

The cable-stayed bridge width reaches 85 metres ( 280.ft ) at the Eastern Entrances, as the Bridge width is increased to accommodate seven different entrance and exit ramps.

The Bridge received PTI Award of Excellence in April 2021 from the Post-Tensioning Institute Design and Construction Supervision by ACE Consulting Engineers ( Moharram and Bakhoum ). Owner and Project Management EAAF.
