= St. Mary's Coptic Orthodox Church Massarra =

Coordinates: 30.07305°N 31.24357°E

Saint Mary Coptic Orthodox Church
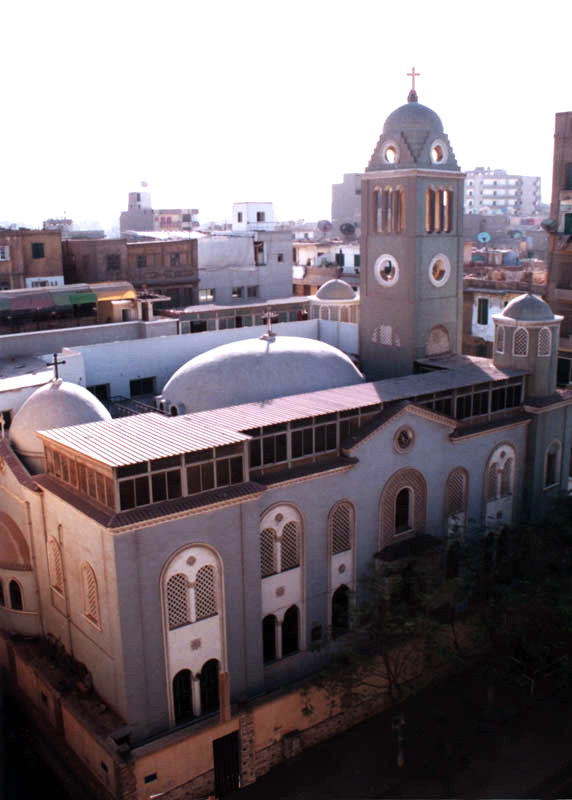
- Saint Mary Coptic Orthodox Church
- Location: Massarra, Shubra
- Country: Egypt
- Denomination: Coptic Orthodox Church
- Website: www.massarra.org

History
- Founder: Pope Cyril V of Alexandria
- Dedication: Saint Mary
- Dedicated: 1925
- Consecrated: 8 April 1925

Architecture
- Architectural type: Church
- Style: Coptic architecture

Administration
- Division: The Coptic Orthodox Patriarchate

Clergy
- Bishop: Bishop Makary, General Bishop for Southern Shobra

St. Mary's Coptic Orthodox Church Massarra is a parish of the Coptic Orthodox Church of Alexandria located in the Shubra District of Cairo, Egypt. The church was built during Pope Cyril V of Alexandria's tenure as Pope of the Coptic Orthodox Church, and consecrated in 1925.

== History ==
St. Mary and Saint Joseph escaping to Egypt. One of the icons in the church

St. Mary's is the oldest church in Shubra, and has held a prominent role in the area since its founding.

On 31 March 1922, a group of Christians formed an association to build the first church in Shubra. After a lengthy search, a plot located in Massarra Street, owned by Saada Kanary pasha, was selected for construction. The purchase contract was signed on 3 April 1923. Royal Decree No. 56, authorising construction of the church, was signed by Fuad I, king of Egypt, dated 11 July 1923.

A temporary wooden hall was soon built, dedicated by Pope Cyril V on Tuesday, 6 November 1923; the building association declared the new church would be a reminder of his golden jubilee on the Throne of St. Mark in 1924. Services there continued until the architectural drawings and designs were completed. The cornerstone was laid on 7 November 1924 by Bishop Abram of Al-Balina. The church was consecrated on 8 April 1925, and Archbishop Sidrus Gahli prayed the first Mass there on Palm Sunday, 12 April 1925, while construction was still underway.

The church has been expanded several times since, including the addition of new chapels as well as a new dome. The parish has also built additional facilities and outbuildings to serve its various ministries, including

- Services Building
- St. Mary's Hall
- St. George's Club
- Libraries
- St. Mary's Computer Centre
- Marcelino's Puppets Theatre

== Icons ==
The church has a collection of icons located in every corner of the church representing some of the events that happened in St. Mary's life, and also some icons of Jesus Christ and his disciples.

== Services ==
Masses are said on Sundays and Fridays. The church also offers religious education, including Bible study and Sunday school.
