= Nouakchott tramway =

Planned tramway system in Nouakchott, Mauritania

Overview
- Native name: Arabic: ترام نواكشوط; French: Tramway de Nouakchott
- Area served: Nouakchott, Mauritania
- Transit type: Tram
- Number of lines: 2 (projected)

Technical
- System length: 45 km (28 mi) (projected)

The Nouakchott tramway (Arabic: ترام نواكشوط, French: Tramway de Nouakchott), also known as the Nouakchott Train (Arabic: قطار نواكشوط, French: Train de Nouakchott), is a planned tramway system in the city of Nouakchott, Mauritania.

== Planning ==
President Mohamed Ould Ghazouani pledged in his campaign for the 2019 Mauritanian presidential election to build rail lines in Nouakchott to alleviate the mobility problems of the city.

On December 24, 2021, the then Minister of Equipment and Transport, Mokhtar Ahmed Yedali, invited the Egyptian company Arab Contractors to "negotiate the construction of a (tram) train in the city of Nouakchott, as part of a program the ministry is working on to develop the country's transport infrastructure".

On 21 July 2022 the then Minister of Equipment and Transports Moktar Ahmed Yedali signed a memorandum of understanding with the President of the Administration Council of Arab Contractors Seyed Farouk to build two tramway lines in the capital of Mauritania, Nouakchott.

The memorandum of understanding stipulates that the Arab Contractors company shall submit a provisional preliminary report within a maximum period of three months, specifying the technical standards of the project, after which it shall be submitted to the Ministry for approval of its content or comments on it. After approving its final version, the Arab Contractors company, at its own expense, will conduct a technical study to know the characteristics of the train track, within a maximum period of one year, provided that it plays the role of assistant to find a financier to finance the project.

The advisor to the Minister of Equipment and Transport in charge of port, river and railway affairs, Yahya Ismail Bahdah, indicated that "after the completion of the study and the agreement of the financier with the Mauritanian side on the method of repayment of the loan, the exemption period and the interest rate and its approval by the Ministry of Economic Affairs, the actual work of the project will begin, with the occupancy period and the type of trains being specified in the aforementioned study".

The reasons cited by the Ministry for the project were its positive impact on the climate by reducing greenhouse gas emissions and global warming, contributing to improve traffic and mobility in the city and strengthening the tourism sector in Mauritania.

By May 2023 rumors emerged that the tramway project may be replaced by a bus-rapid transit (BRT) network after an undisclosed source in the Ministry of Equipements and Transport leaked an inform named "Nouakchott Mobility by 2026" (Arabic: حركية نواكشوط في أفق 2026) in which it was mentioned that the government's main plans were "strengthening the government transport company's fleet with fifty new buses", which were acquired on February. The source also mentioned that the BRT project as "will provide a transportation system with high-quality buses on reserved routes with a length of 51 kilometers in all the provinces of Nouakchott, with an intelligent traffic management system at the main intersections, in addition to reorganizing public transportation with the creation of special lanes for pedestrians and bicycles". This led to criticism over corruption in the Mauritanian government, comparing it with the cancellation of previous projects.

The memorandum of understanding was renewed on 26 September 2023 for six more months to further study the project, with the Minister of Equipment and Transports adding that the project work “requires three years”. A briefing issued by the Ministry of Equipment and Transports added that it had received proposals from the Arab Contractors regarding the technical plan of the project and means of financing.

== Network ==
Two lines are planned, each 22.5 kilometres (14.0 miles) long.

- The first line will connect the campus of University of Nouakchott Al Aasriya, in the Tevragh Zeina department, with the end of the Toujounine department, passing through the city center.
- The second line will connect Carrefour Bamako in the Riyadh department and Carrefour Hay Saken in the Dar Naïm department through the areas that separate them from the city center.

== See also ==
- Mauritania Railway
- Transport in Mauritania
- List of tram and light rail transit systems
