= Michel Bakhoum =

Egyptian engineer, professor, and researcher

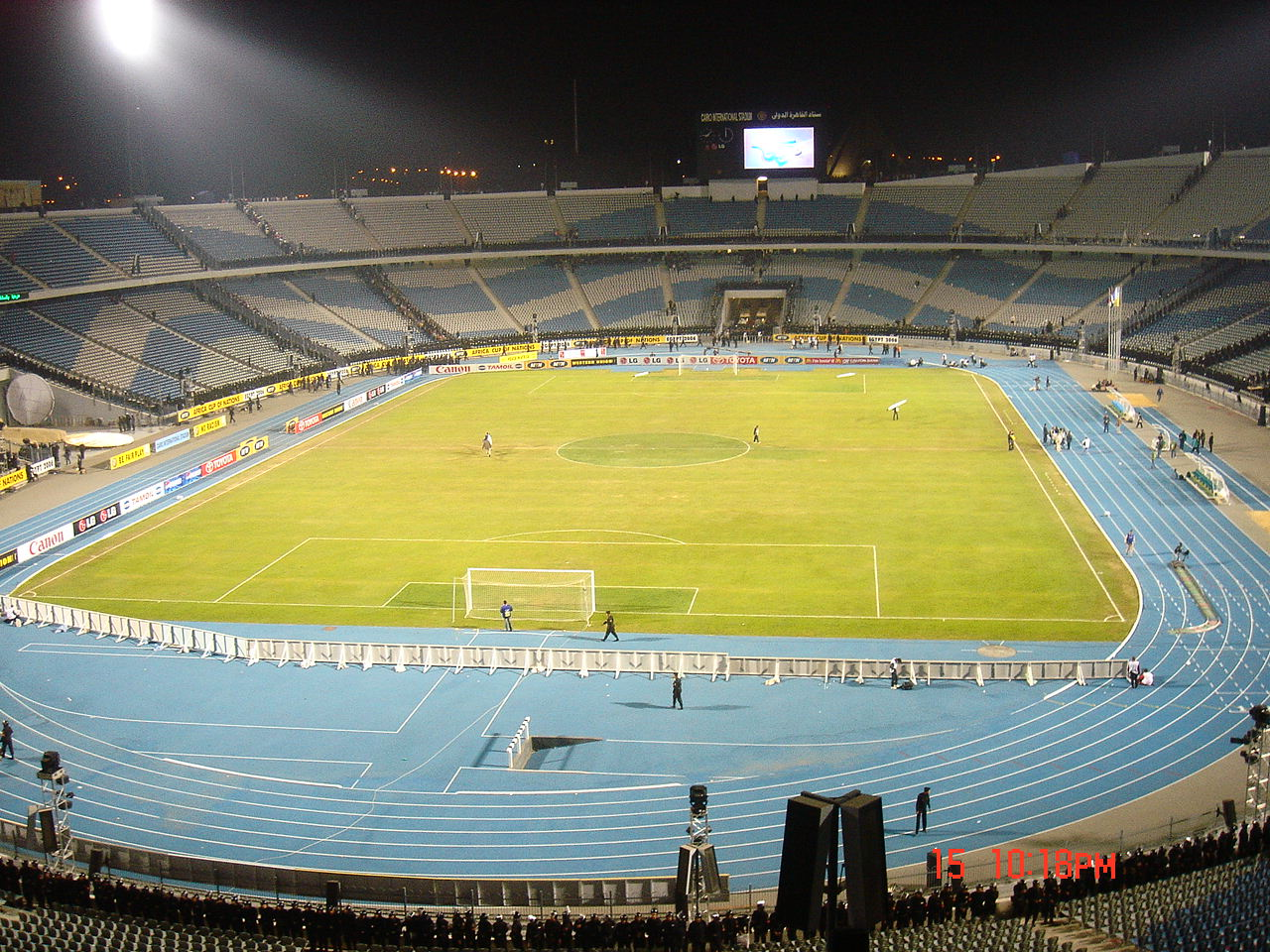
Michel Bakhoum designed Cairo International Stadium

Michel Bakhoum (Coptic: ⲙⲓⲭⲁⲏⲗ ⲡⲁϩⲱⲙ, Arabic: ميشيل باخوم, Mīšīl Bāḫūm; 1913–1981) was an Egyptian consulting civil engineer, university professor, and a researcher in concrete structures.

== Education and early years ==
Michel Bakhoum was born in June 1913 in Cairo.

He graduated from the Civil Engineering Department at Cairo University in 1936 (then known as Fouad I University). He completed his M.Sc. in 1942, and his first Ph.D. in 1945. He was the second person in Egypt to receive a Ph.D. from the Faculty of Engineering at Cairo University. In 1945, he traveled to the University of Illinois at Urbana-Champaign where he received his second Ph.D. He then spent one year at Columbia University in New York, to strengthen his background in theoretical mechanics, theory of elasticity, and theory of plasticity. He worked also (part time) in a consulting engineering firm at the same time in New York City, to get acquainted with state-of-the-art design methodologies of concrete structures in the United States.

== Consulting engineering ==
In 1949, Michel Bakhoum returned to Egypt where he started teaching in the Structural Engineering Department at Cairo University as an assistant professor. He started a consulting firm in 1950 with his colleague Ahmed Moharram. The company is now known as ACE: Arab Consulting Engineers (Moharram-Bakhoum). The company started as a structural-design office with four people in 1950, now the company has over eight-hundred staff working with the consulting firm ACE.

== Academic career ==
Michel Bakhoum taught civil and structural engineering students for about forty years, mainly at Cairo University, but also at Ain Shams and Assiut Universities. He was a teaching assistant from 1937 to 1945, and then as assistant professor and professor from 1949 to 1981.

== Societies ==
Michel Bakhoum was a fellow and member in several technical societies — Fellow of the Institution of Structural Engineers (UK), and representative in Egypt from 1972 to 1979; Fellow of the American Society of Civil Engineers; Member of the American Concrete Institute; and Member of the International Association for Bridges and Structural Engineering and various other engineering and academic bodies.

== Awards ==
He received three official awards from the President of Egypt for his designs of Cairo Stadium, Cairo Airport, and Cairo International Fair Ground Buildings (including several prestressed concrete shells), in 1960, 1963, and 1964 respectively. He received an award for designing these prestressed shells in 1966 from the FIP (International federation for Prestressed Concrete).

1960 Egyptian Republic Award (3rd Level) ( وسام الجمهورية - الطبقة الثالثة ) ; 1963 Award for Science and Arts (1st Degree) ( وسام العلوم والفنون - الطبقة الاولى); 1964 Award for Trade and Industry (1st Degree) ( وسام التجارة والصناعة - الطبقة الاولى)

Prof. Michel Bakhoum died on 21 April 1981. The next day, the daily Egyptian newspaper Al-Ahram published a front-page news article about him, citing that he had died, and summarized his main works. Al-Ahram is the main newspaper in Egypt, established in 1876, with about one million copies printed daily. News in the first page of Al-Ahram about people who have died, is only kept for the most notable in Egypt. In addition, a street in the Dokki District (in Giza - Greater Cairo) where he lived was named after him, Dr. Michel Bakhoum Street. This is considered an honor bestowed to very few people in Egypt. An article about Bakhoum appears in both the "Dictionary of Distinguished Egyptians in the 20th Century" published by the Middle East News Agency in 1998 and the "History of the Coptic Church, Volume 8: 20th Century".

In October 2025, Michel Bakhoum International Collaboration Award was presented to Kari Lee Yuers, FACI, is president and CEO of Kryton International Inc. in Vancouver, BC, Canada, appointed in 2001 “for providing leadership, guidance, and support of ACI’s international initiatives, and collaborating globally in technology transfer activities aimed at improving the durability and sustainability of concrete”.

== See also ==
- List of prominent Copts
- Michel Bakhoum: Pioneer of the Built Infrastructure of Africa's Most Populous Nation, By Seif El Rashidi, Great Achievements, Structure Magazine, USA, April, 2014, http://www.structuremag.org/wp-content/uploads/D-GreatAch-Rashidi-Apr141.pdf
- Watani Newspaper, Cairo, Egypt, June 2013: https://www.wataninet.com/2013/06/%D9%85%D9%8A%D8%B4%D9%8A%D9%84-%D8%A8%D8%A7%D8%AE%D9%88%D9%85-%D9%81%D9%89-%D9%85%D8%A6%D9%88%D9%8A%D8%A9-%D9%85%D9%8A%D9%84%D8%A7%D8%AF%D9%87-%D8%B9%D8%A7%D8%B4%D9%82-%D8%A7%D9%84%D9%85%D8%A8%D8%A7/
- Saint Mark's Coptic Orthodox Cathedral: https://en.wikipedia.org/wiki/Saint_Mark%27s_Coptic_Orthodox_Cathedral
- 6 October Bridge: https://en.wikipedia.org/wiki/6th_October_Bridge
- American Concrete Institute Announces the Michel Bakhoum International Collaboration Award https://www.concrete.org/newsandevents/news/newsdetail.aspx?f=51743310
- American Concrete Institute Honors Outstanding Contributions to the Industry https://www.concrete.org/newsandevents/news/newsdetail.aspx?f=51749264
