= 6th October Bridge =

Highway bridge in Cairo, Egypt

6th of October Bridge كوبري 6 أكتوبر
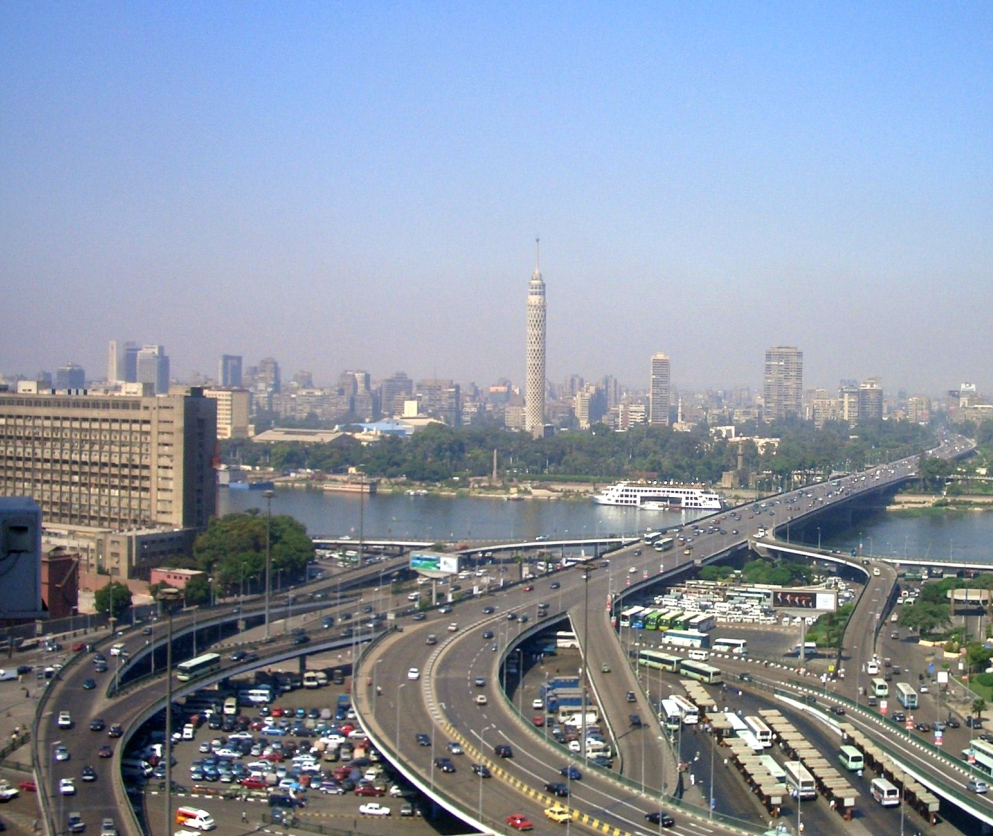
- A view of a small section of the 6th October Bridge near Ramses station and Egyptian Museum, crossing Nile River to Gezira Island with Cairo Tower in background.
- Coordinates: 30.0492°N 31.2292°E
- Locale: Cairo, Egypt
- Official name: كوبري السادس من أكتوبر
- Other name: October Bridge
- Owner: Egyptian state
- Maintained by: General Authority For Roads, Bridges & Land Transport

Characteristics
- Design: Concrete Girder Bridge
- Total length: 20.5 km (12.7 mi)

History
- Designer: ACE Moharram Bakhoum
- Engineering design by: ACE Moharram Bakhoum; Fritsch- Chiari & Partner ZT GmbH
- Constructed by: Arab Contractors
- Construction start: 1969
- Construction end: 1996

Location
- Interactive map of 6th of October Bridge

The 6th of October Bridge (Arabic: كوبري 6 أكتوبر, romanized: Kubri 6 [Sadis] Uktubar) is an elevated highway in Cairo, the capital city of Egypt. The 20.5-kilometre (12.7 mi) bridge and causeway crosses the Nile twice from western bank city of Giza east through Gezira Island to Downtown Cairo, and on to connect the city to other highways that lead to the Cairo International Airport to the east.

Its name commemorates the date of Operation Badr in 1973, when the Egyptian military crossed the Suez Canal and attacked the Israeli military's Bar Lev Line, sparking the Yom Kippur War.

== History ==
The bridge and causeway were completed in 1996, with construction taking nearly 30 years. It began in 1969 with the modest, 130 metres (430 ft)-long Phase 1, which only spanned the smaller west branch of the Nile from Gezira to Agouza (built from May 1969 to August 1972). Phase 9 completed the 21.193 kilometres (13.169 mi)-long final length in 2005. The '6th October Bridge and Flyover' runs from the Agricultural Museum in Dokki east to the Autostrade in Nasr City.

The building of the 6th October Bridge and causeway has been declared a national infrastructure project.

In April 2021, President Abdel Fattah el-Sisi gave the order to expand and upgrade the bridge, as well as the roads underneath it.

== Route ==
The 6th of October starts at an intersection with the Ministry of Agriculture Street which then travel east, meeting the western Corniche before crossing the Nile. It then passes through El Gezira island. After crossing the Nile the second time comes a large intersection at Abdel Minaam Riyadh Square, connecting the eastern Corniche and Ramses Street, after which will it goes to Ramses Square in a straight path. Then, the bridge continues paralleling Ramses Street as well as train tracks that belong to a railway and metro system, which, near Ghamra metro station, the bridge is supported with suspension bridge-like towers. It later continue until it reaches El Demerdash metro station which at this point, goes south. It then intersects with Salah Salem road, and finally merged with the Emtedad Ramses causeway near El Nasr Autostrade that directs to New Cairo.

== Public use ==
The 6th October Bridge has been called the 'spinal cord' of Cairo, with approximately half a million Cairene people using it on a daily basis. Due to its role as Cairo's central East–West automobile and truck route, the bridge and causeway is nearly always crowded with traffic, with the trip from one end to another taking up to 45 minutes.

== Egyptian Revolution of 2011 ==
During the Egyptian Revolution of 2011, the bridge had been a major route to the Tahrir Square democracy demonstrations, and also itself been the scene of violent confrontations between pro-Mubarak protesters and anti-Mubarak protesters.

== Gallery ==
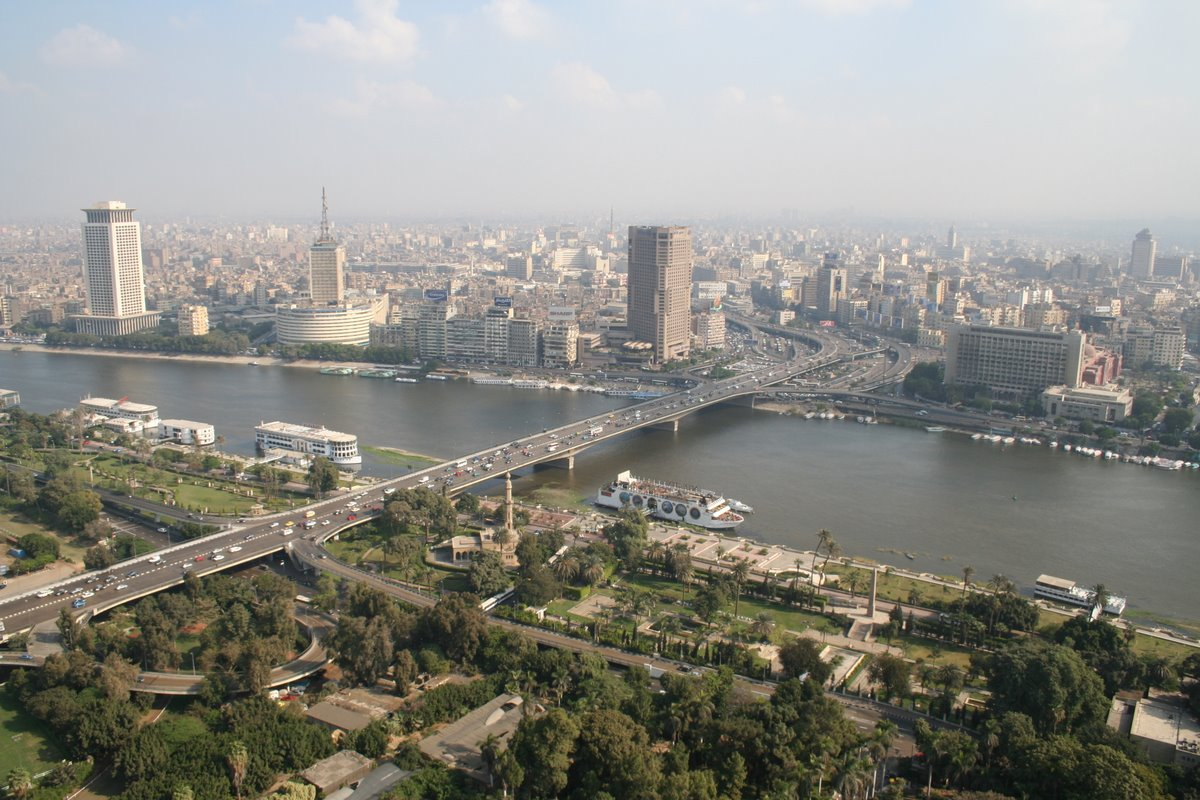
The 6th October Bridge, with Gezira Island in the foreground, the Nile, and Downtown Cairo in the background

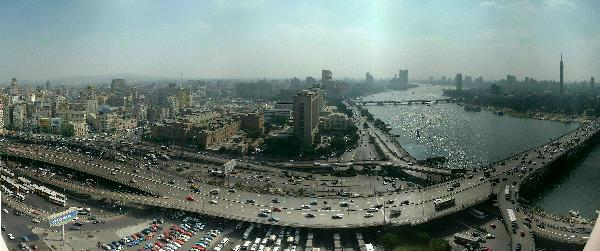
The 6th October Bridge, ramps, and Nile; with Downtown Cairo and Egyptian Museum (on left), in view north from Ramses Hilton

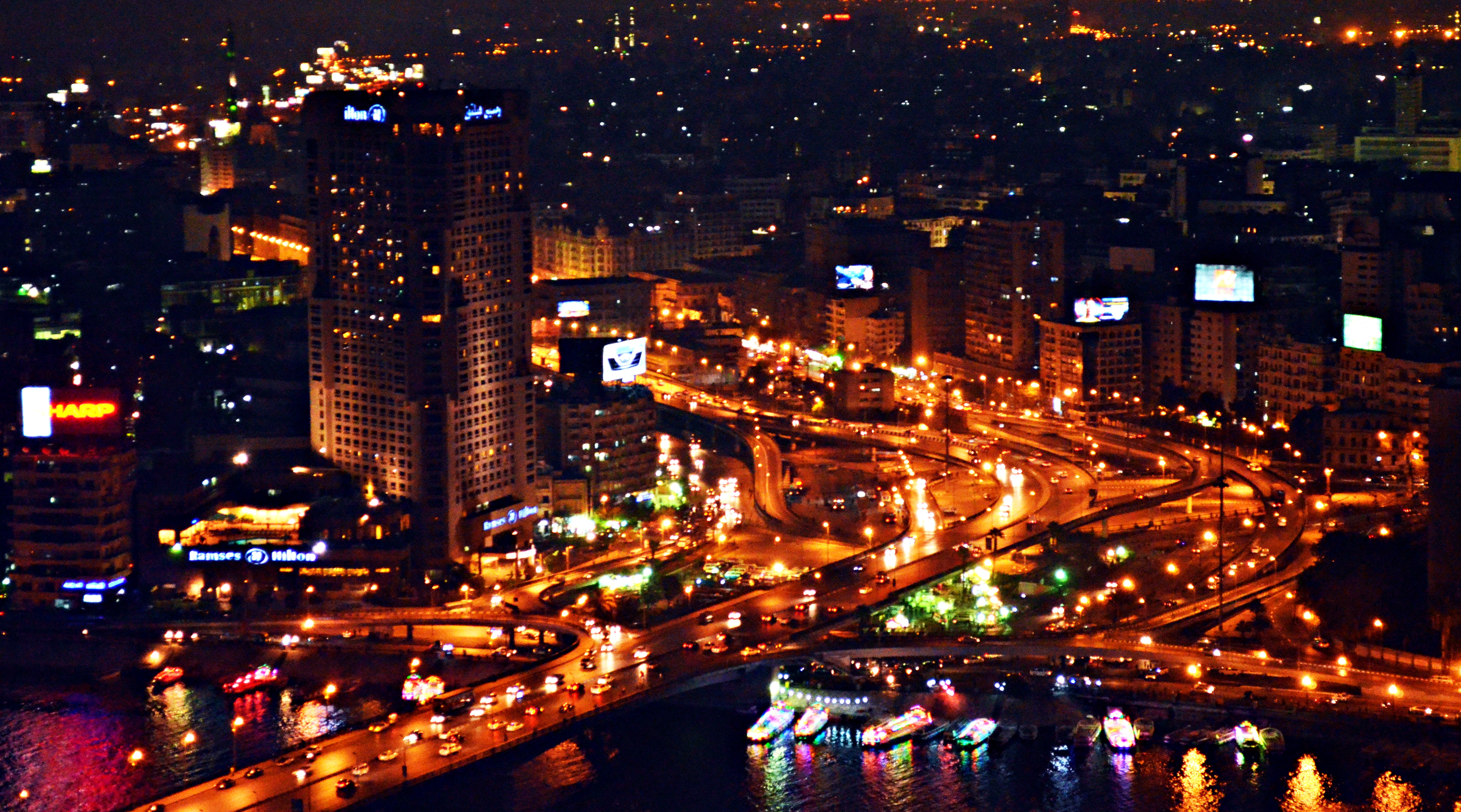
6th October Bridge at night

Al Jazeera video of the democracy demonstration clashes at 6th October Bridge and ramps (on 28 January 2011)
