= Arab Contractors =

Egyptian construction and contracting company

The Arab Contractors
- Type: Government-owned corporation
- Industry: Construction
- Founded: 1955; 71 years ago
- Founders: Osman Ahmed Osman
- Headquarters: Cairo, Egypt
- Services: General contracting, architecture, civil engineering
- Revenue: E£11.03 billion (2013)
- Number of employees: 72,097 (2013)
- Website: www.arabcont.com

The Arab Contractors, known locally as Al Mokawloon Al Arab (Arabic: المقاولون العرب, romanized: al-Muqāwilūn al-ʿArab), is an Egyptian regional construction and contracting company.

== History ==
It was established in 1955 by Osman Ahmed Osman, an Egyptian entrepreneur and politician who served as Egypt's Housing Minister under Sadat's presidency. It was nationalized in 1961 following the Egyptian revolution of 1952. It has been involved in the construction of several government buildings in Egypt. The company also owns a football club, El Mokawloon SC, that plays in the Egyptian Premier League.

Since the late 1970s, the company has diversified its business to include banking, insurance, agriculture, food processing, hotel services and health care. Today, El-Mokawloon El-Arab is one of the largest companies in the Middle East and North Africa with projects not only in Egypt, but also Morocco, UAE, Algeria, Libya, Uganda, Lebanon, Kuwait.

== Infrastructure projects ==
- Aswan High Dam
- Bibliotheca Alexandrina
- Cairo-Alexandria desert road
- Luxor International Airport
- Sharm El Sheikh International Airport
- Hurghada International Airport
- Nador International Airport - Morocco
- Borg El Arab Stadium
- Yasser Arafat International Airport - Gaza Strip (destroyed in 2001)
- Julius Nyerere Hydropower Station
- 6th October Bridge
- Nador International Airport
- Smart Village, Egypt
- Rod El Farag Axis Bridge
- Nouakchott Tramway - Mauritania

== See also ==
- Construction industry in Egypt
