= Outline of Cairo =

Capital and largest city of Egypt

The following outline is provided as an overview of and topical guide to Cairo:

Cairo –

== General reference ==
- Pronunciation: (English: /ˈkaɪroʊ/ KY-roh; Arabic: القاهرة, romanized: al-Qāhirah, IPA: [ælˈqɑːhɪɾɑ];
- Common English name(s): Cairo
- Official English name(s): Cairo
- Adjectival(s): Cairene
- Demonym(s): Cairene

== Geography of Cairo ==
Geography of Cairo

- Cairo is:
  - a city
    - capital of Egypt
- Population of Cairo: 9,153,135
- Area of Cairo: 606 km^{2} (234 sq mi)

Cairo القاهرة
- Location within Egypt
- Coordinates: 30°2′40″N 31°14′9″E

=== Location of Cairo ===
- Cairo is situated within the following regions:
  - Northern Hemisphere and Eastern Hemisphere
    - Africa (outline)
      - North Africa
      - Sahara Desert
        - Middle East
          - Egypt (outline)
            - Lower Egypt
              - Cairo Governorate
                - Greater Cairo
- Time zone(s):
  - Egypt Standard Time (UTC+02)
    - In Summer: Egypt Daylight Time (UTC+03)

=== Environment of Cairo ===
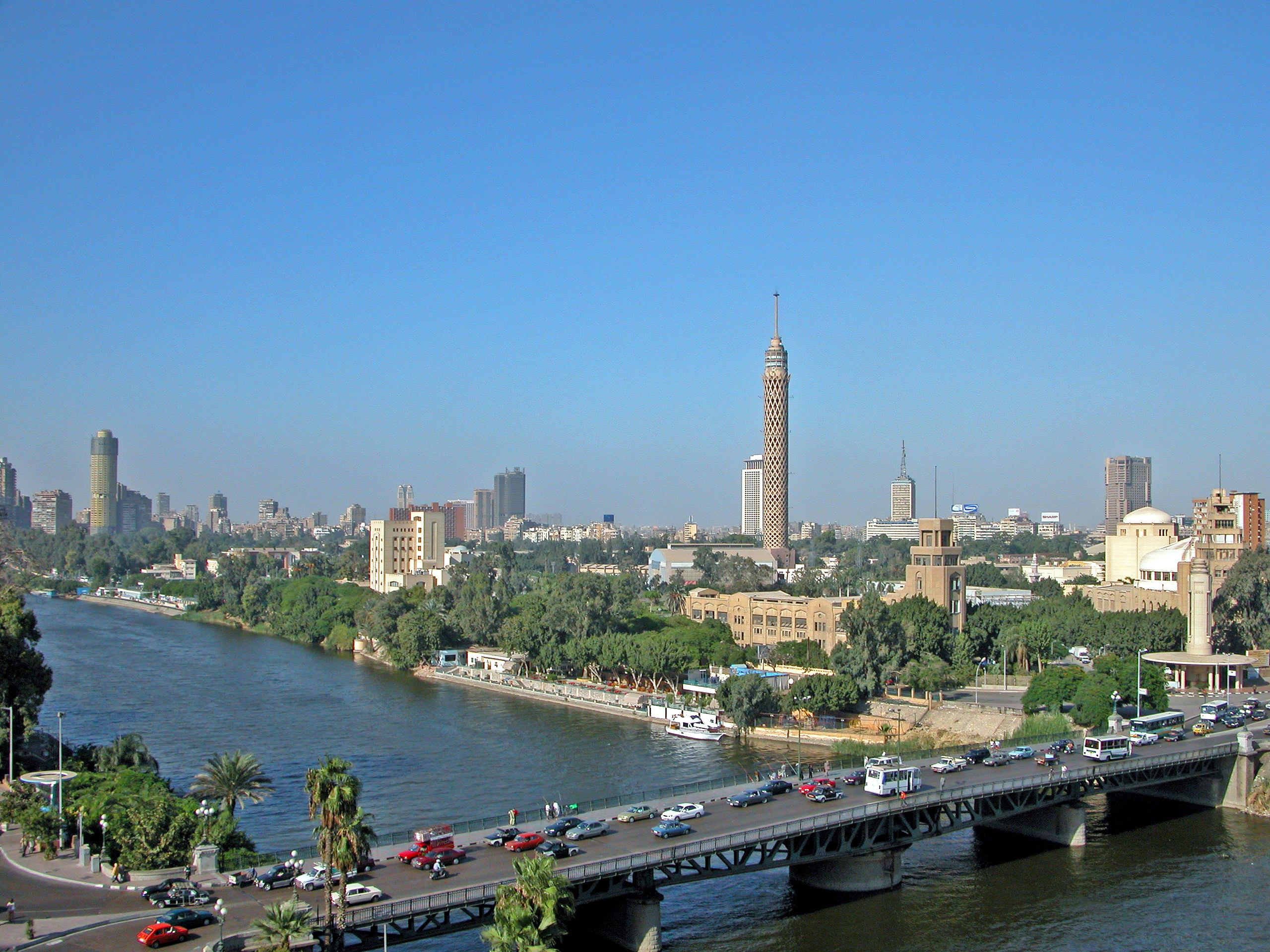
The Nile in Cairo. View of Gezira island

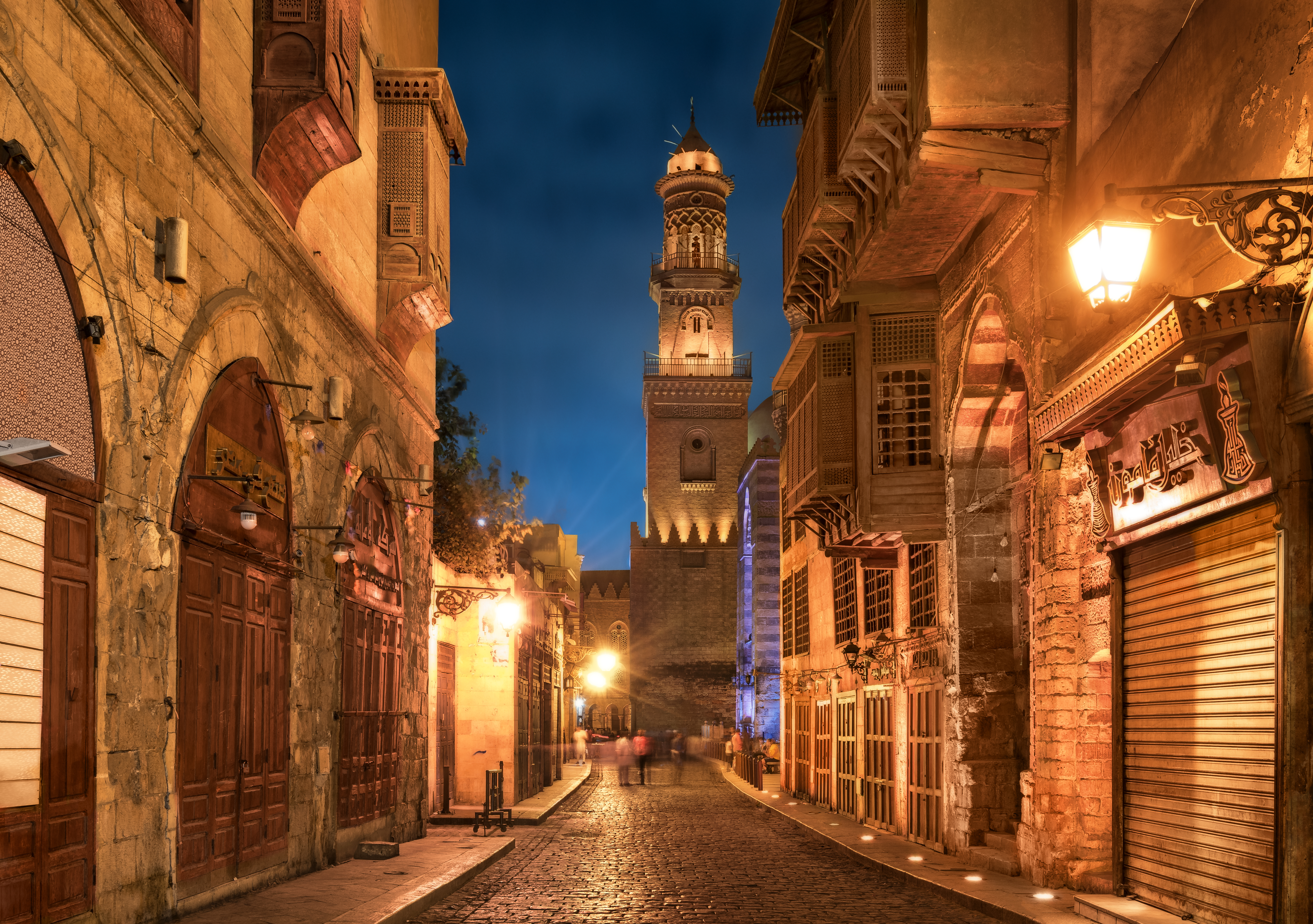
Islamic Cairo

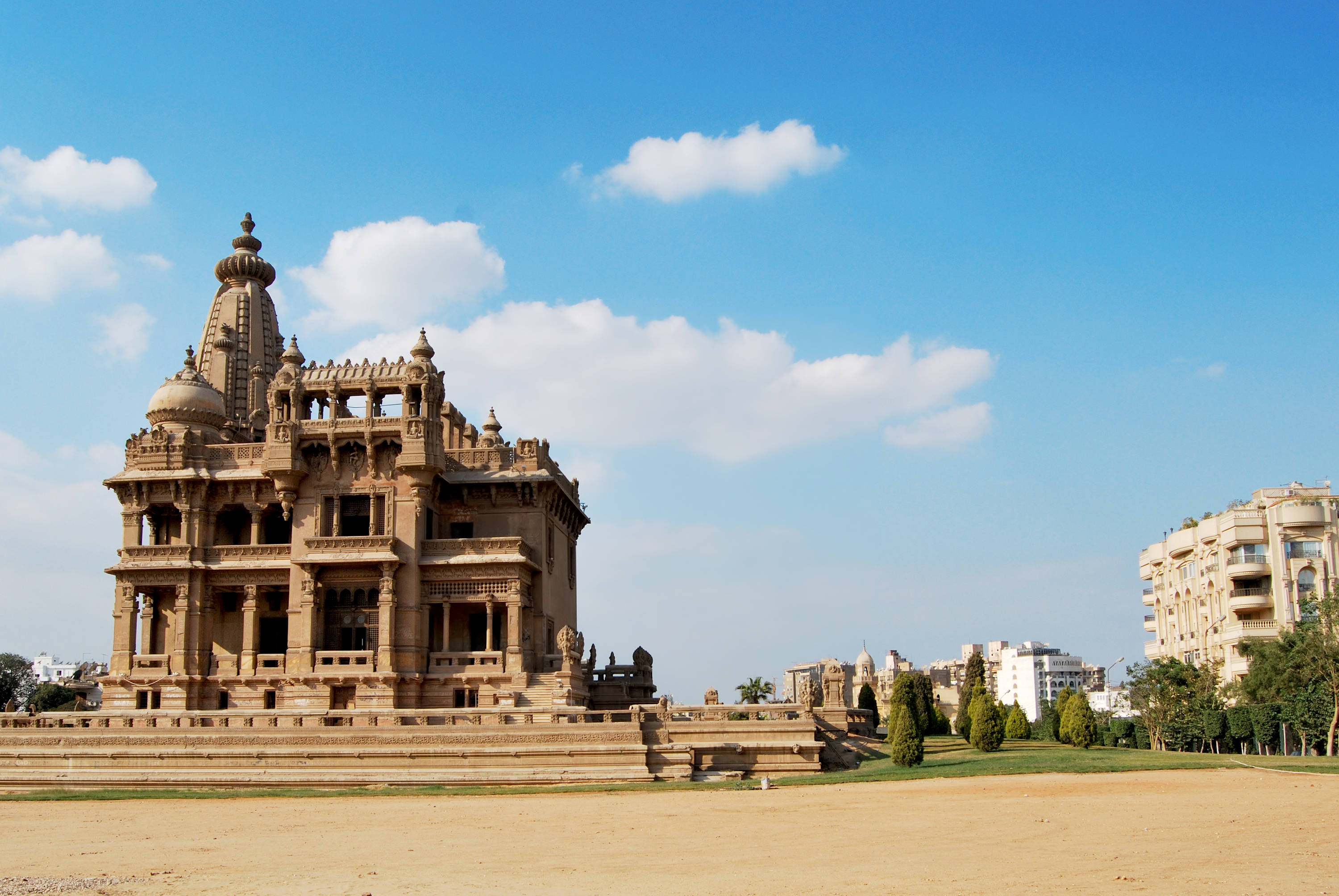
Salah Salem, a main street in Heliopolis

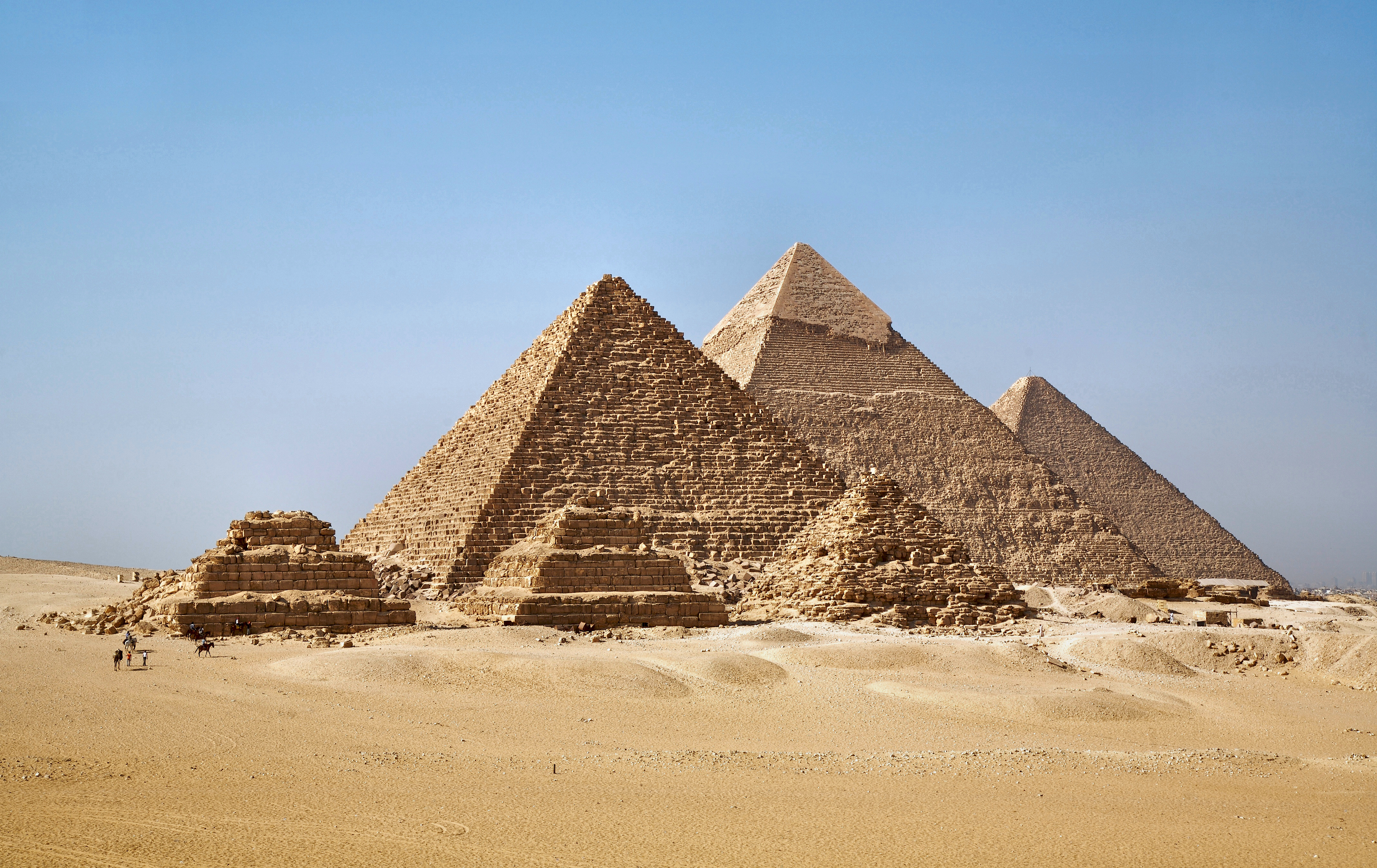
Giza pyramid complex

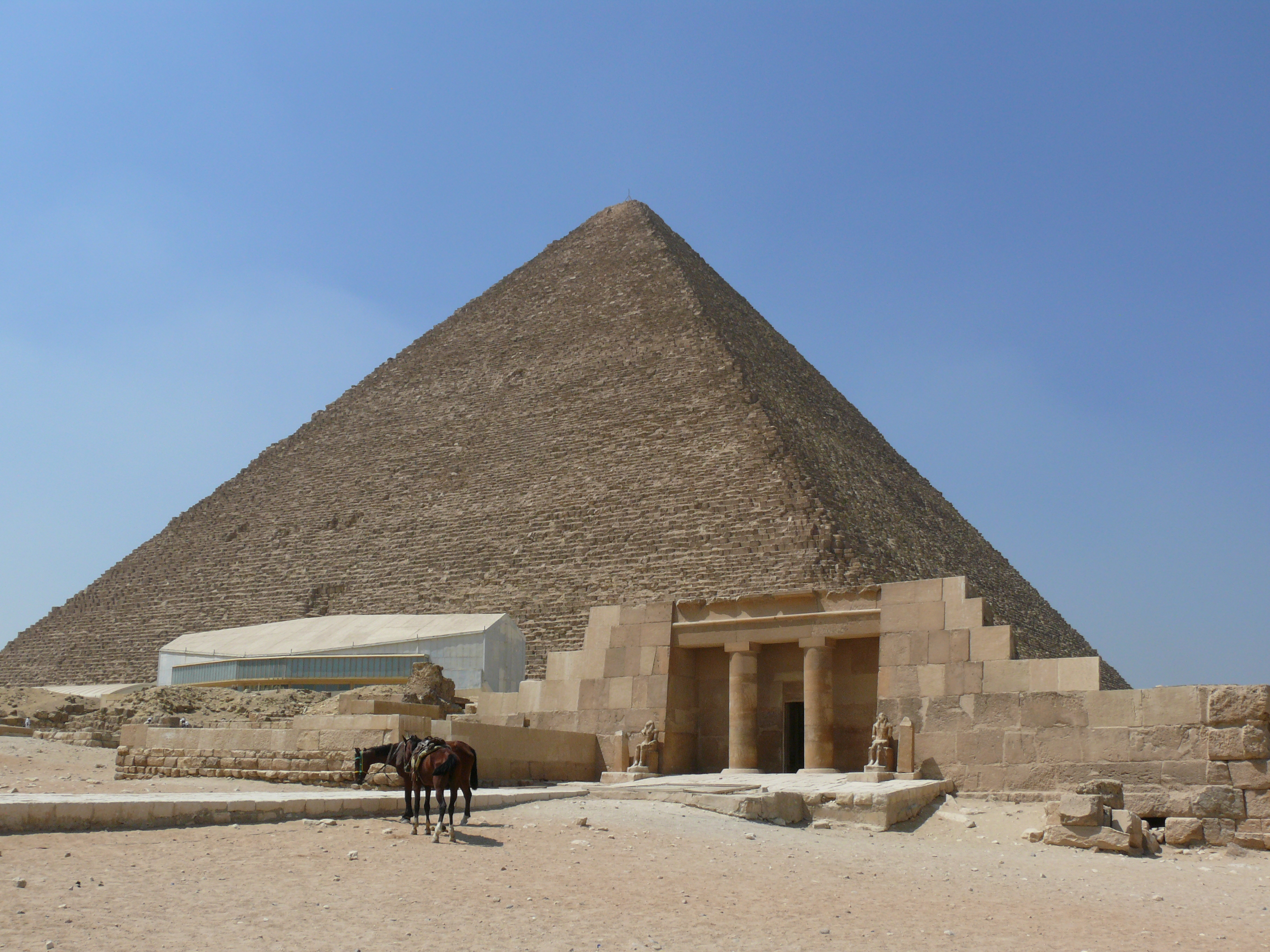
Great Pyramid of Giza

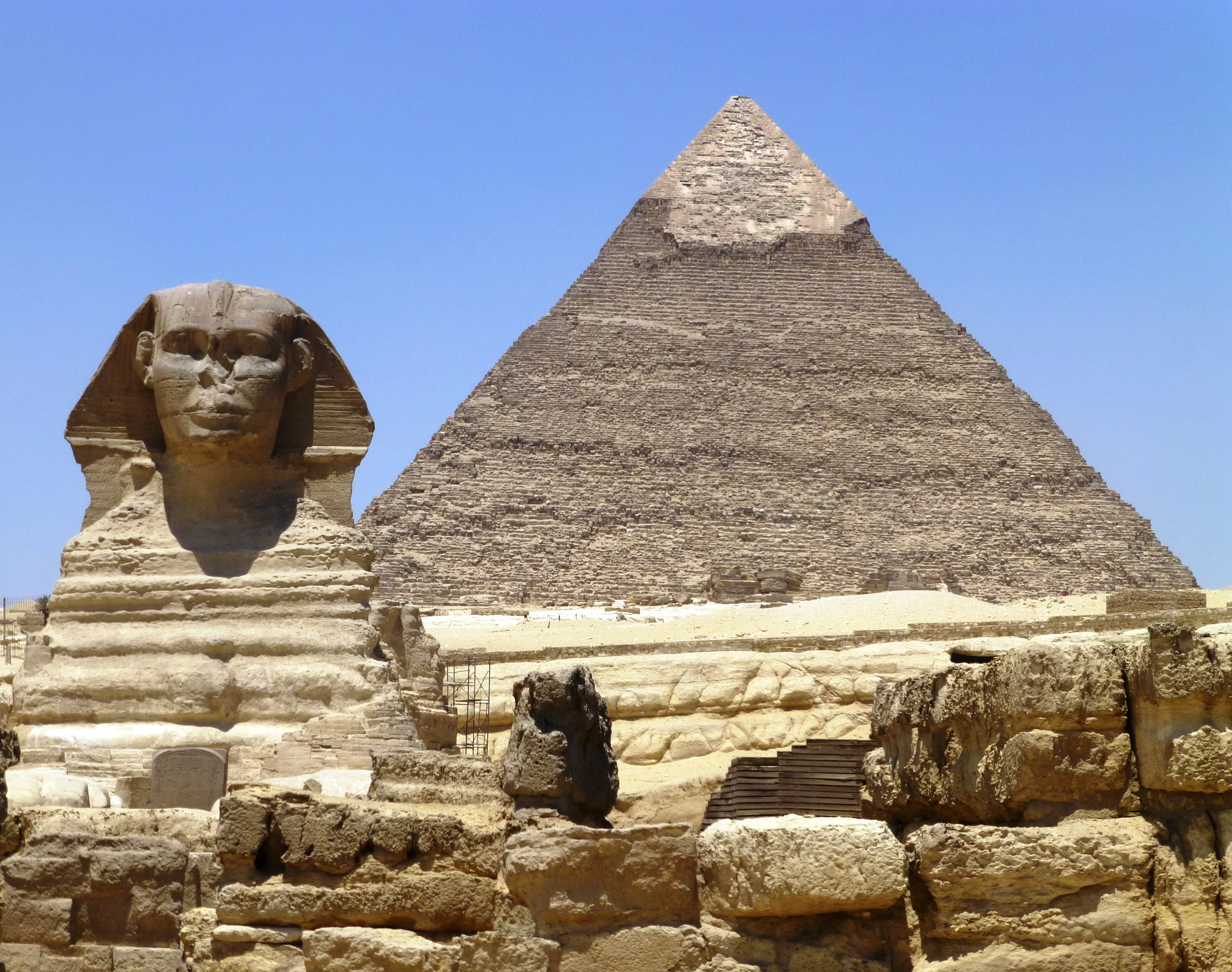
Khafre Pyramid and the Great Sphinx of Giza

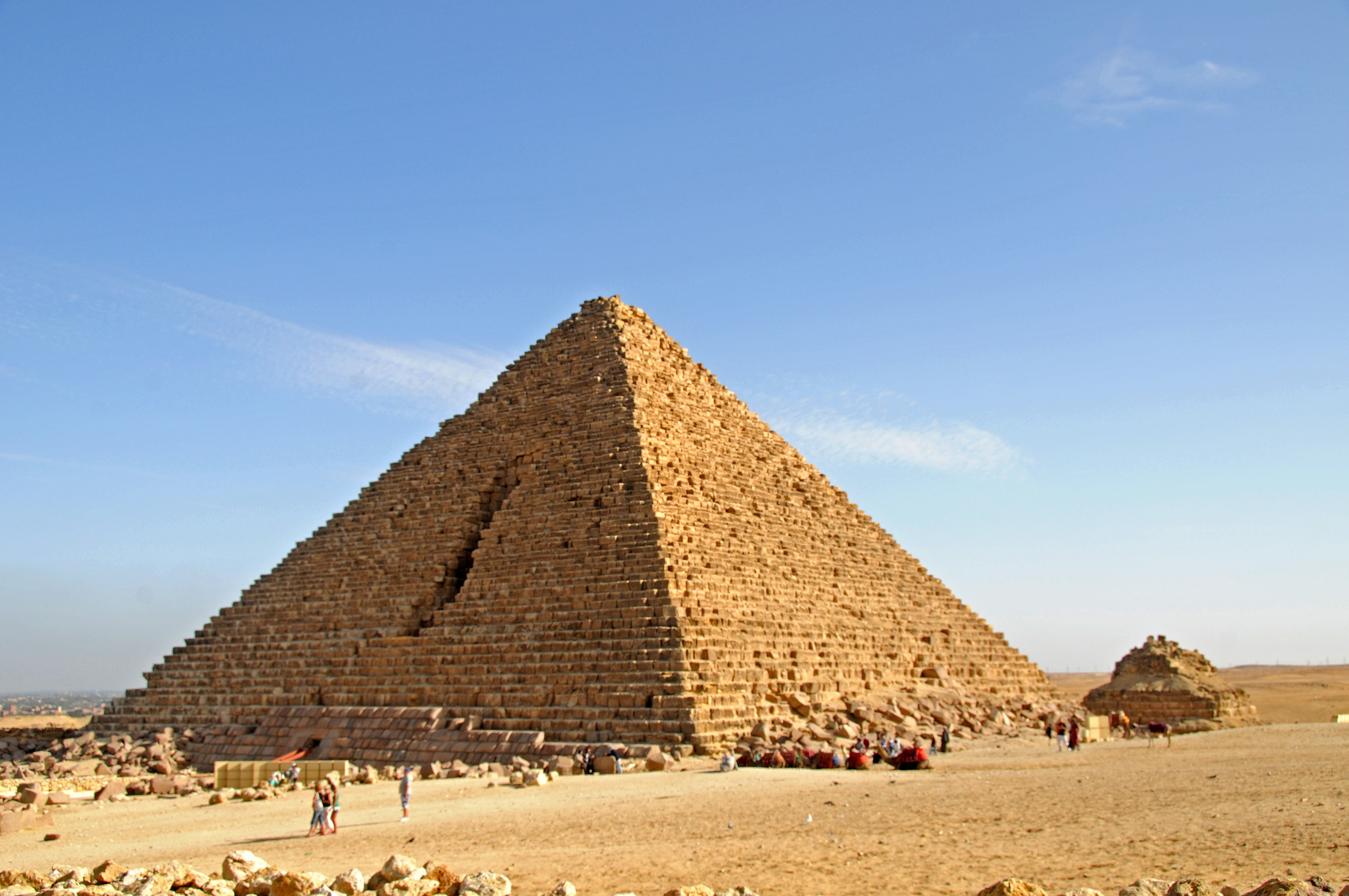
Pyramid of Menkaure

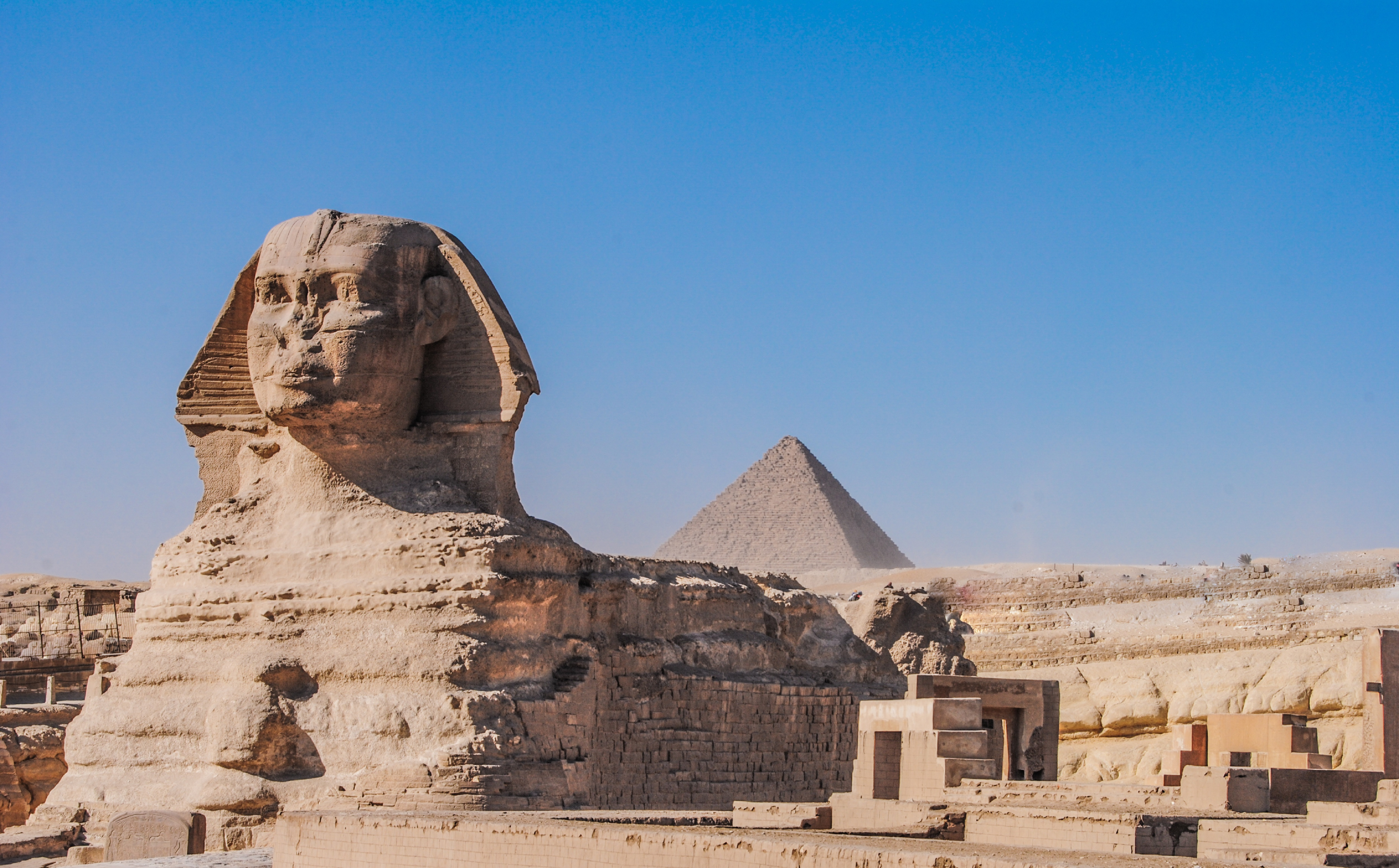
Great Sphinx of Giza

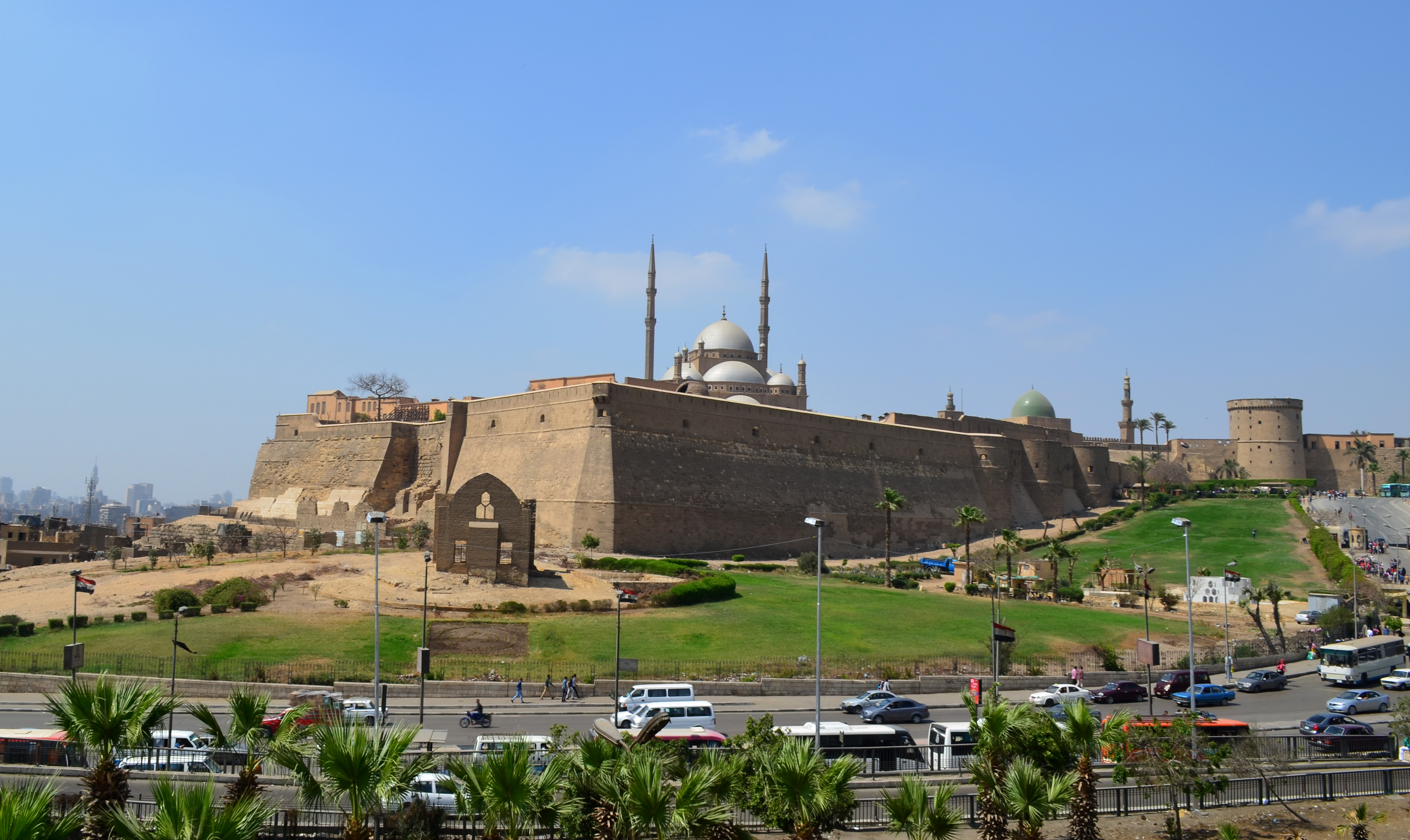
Cairo Citadel

- Climate of Cairo

==== Natural geographic features of Cairo ====
- Hills in Cairo
  - Mokattam
- Islands in Cairo
  - Gezira
  - Roda Island
- Rivers in Cairo
  - Nile
- World Heritage Sites in Cairo
  - Islamic Cairo

=== Areas of Cairo ===
- Coptic Cairo
- Downtown Cairo
- Islamic Cairo
- Old Cairo

==== Districts of Cairo ====
- Azbakeya
- Bulaq
- Daher
- El Manial
- El Qobbah
- El Sakkakini
- Faggala
- Garden City
- Heliopolis
- Maadi
- Nasr City
- Shubra
- Zamalek
- Zeitoun

==== Neighbourhoods in Cairo ====
- Abbassia

=== Locations in Cairo ===
- Tourist attractions in Cairo
  - Museums in Cairo
    - Egyptian Museum
  - Shopping areas and markets
    - Qasaba of Radwan Bey
  - World Heritage Sites in Cairo
    - Giza pyramid complex
      - Great Pyramid of Giza
      - Pyramid of Khafre
      - Pyramid of Menkaure
      - Great Sphinx of Giza

==== Ancient monuments in Cairo ====
- Babylon Fortress
- Statue of Ramesses II

==== Bridges in Cairo ====
- 6th October Bridge
- Boulak Bridge
- Imbaba Bridge
- Qasr El Nil Bridge

==== Cultural and exhibition centres in Cairo ====
- El Sawy Culture Wheel

==== Forts in Cairo ====
- Cairo Citadel

==== Fountains in Cairo ====
- Sabil-Kuttab of Katkhuda

==== Gates in Cairo ====
Gates of Cairo

- Bab al-Futuh
- Bab al-Nasr
- Bab Zuweila

==== Monuments and memorials in Cairo ====
- Emir Qurqumas Complex
- Mausoleum of Saad Zaghloul
- Unknown Soldier Memorial

==== Museums and art galleries in Cairo ====
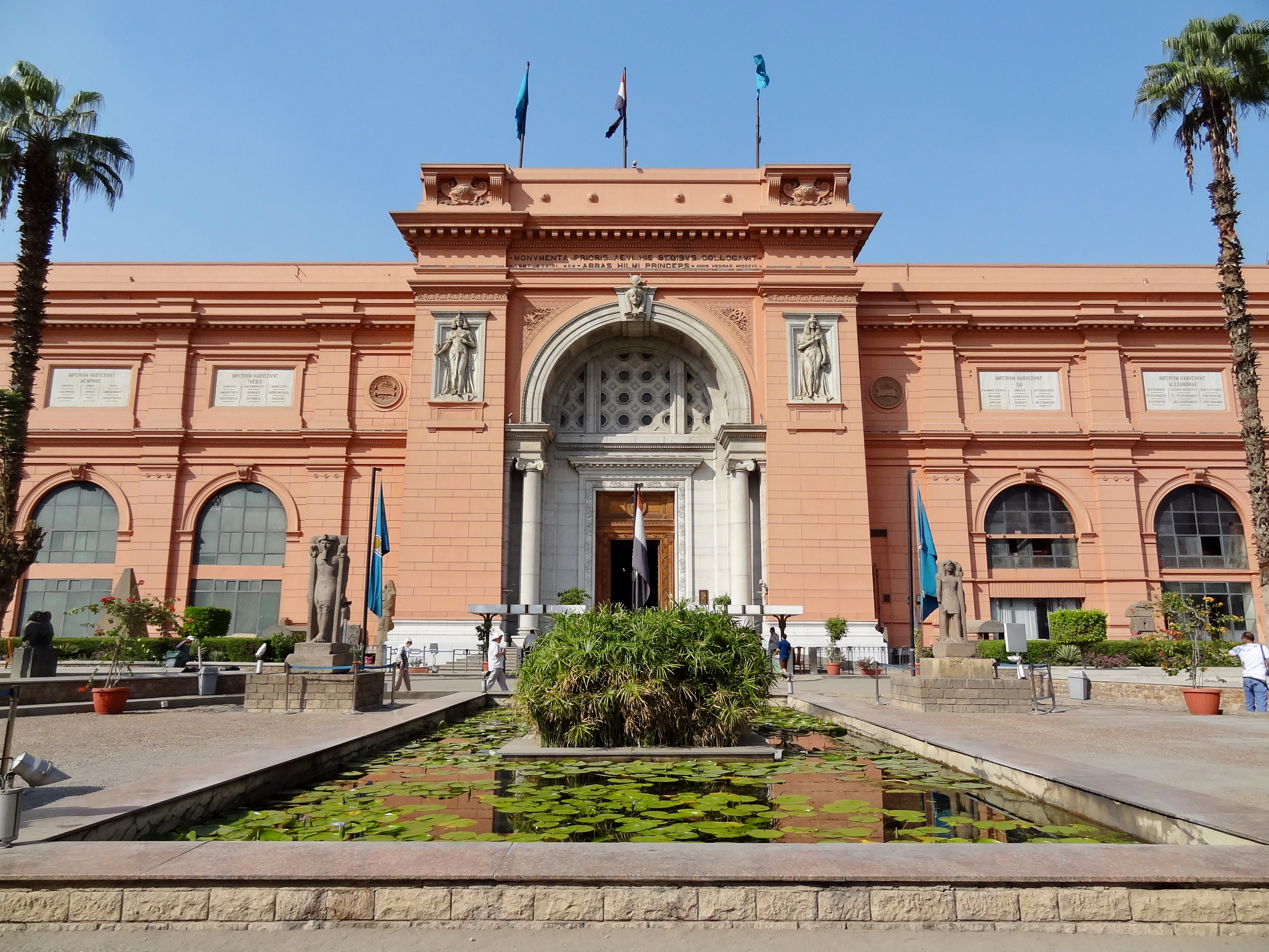
The Egyptian Museum

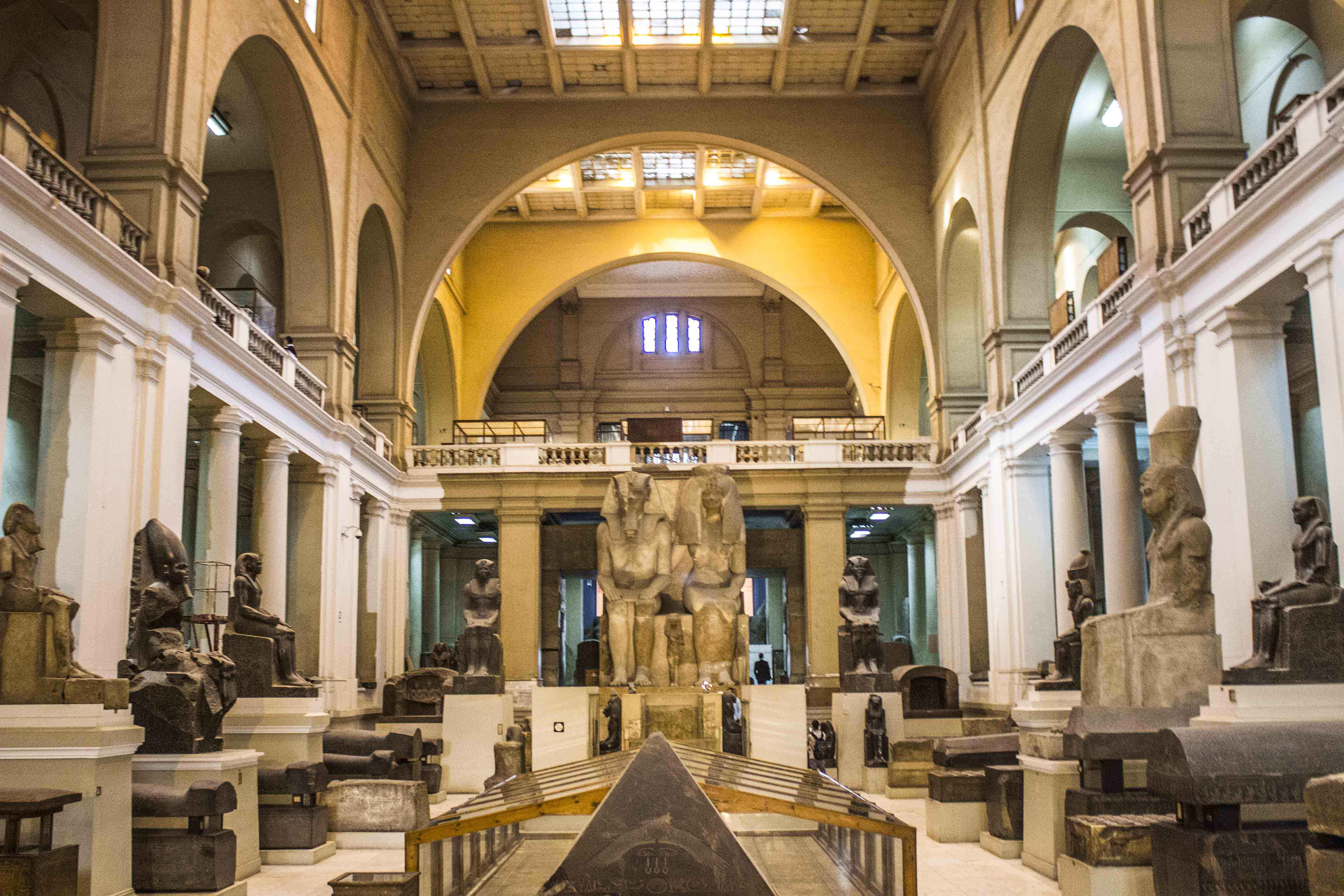
Interior of Egyptian Museum

Museums in Cairo

- 6th of October Panorama
- Bayt Al-Suhaymi
- Beit El-Umma
- Carriage Museum
- Coptic Museum
- Egyptian Geological Museum
- Egyptian Museum
  - Anubis Shrine
- Egyptian National Military Museum
- Gayer-Anderson Museum
- Gezira Center for Modern Art
- Mohamed Mahmoud Khalil Museum
- Mukhtar Museum
- Museum of Islamic Art, Cairo
- Museum of Islamic Ceramics
- National Museum of Egyptian Civilization
- Qasr Al-Eini Museum
- The Townhouse Gallery

==== Palaces and villas in Cairo ====
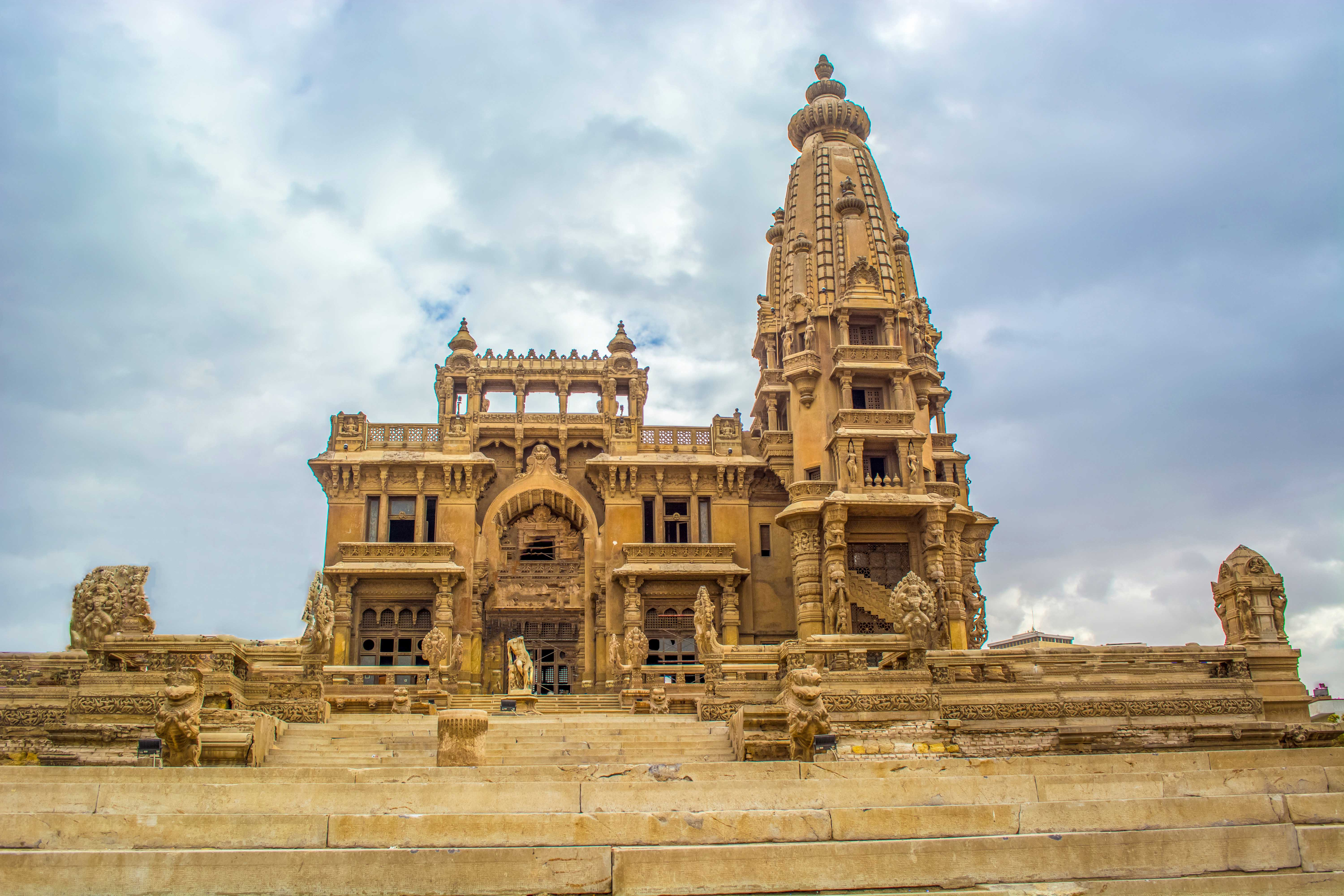
The Baron Empain Palace

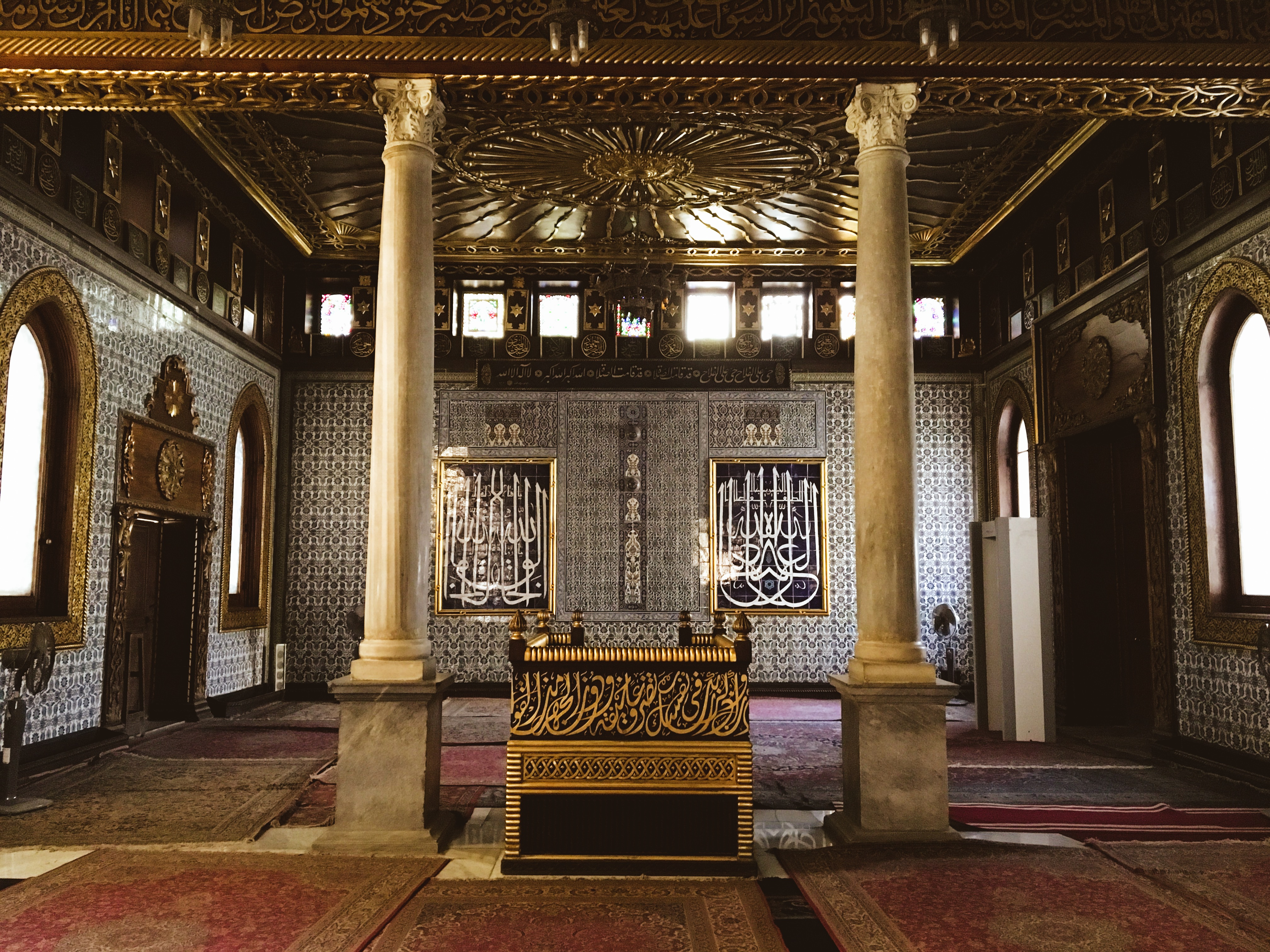
Interior of Al-Manyal Palace

- Abdeen Palace
- Al-Gawhara Palace
- Amir Alin Aq Palace
- Amir Taz Palace
- Baron Empain Palace
- Beshtak Palace
- Dubara Palace
- Gezirah Palace
- Heliopolis Palace
- Khairy Pasha Palace
- Koubbeh Palace
- Manial Palace and Museum
- Palace of Yashbak
- Prince Amr Ibrahim Palace
- Tahra Palace
- Tara
- Zaafarana palace

==== Parks and gardens in Cairo ====
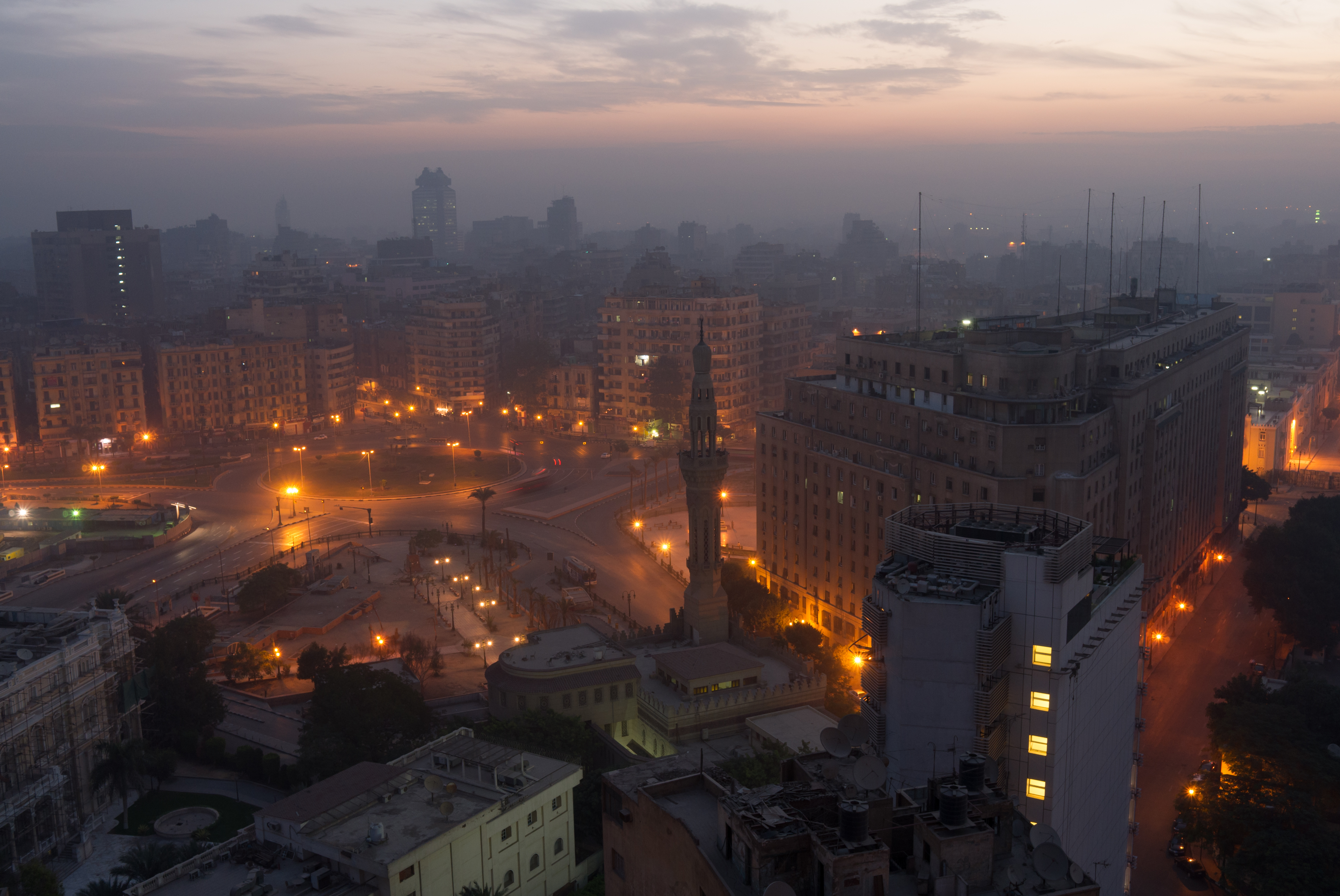
Tahrir Square in the early morning

- Al-Azhar Park

==== Public squares in Cairo ====
- Tahrir Square

==== Religious buildings in Cairo ====
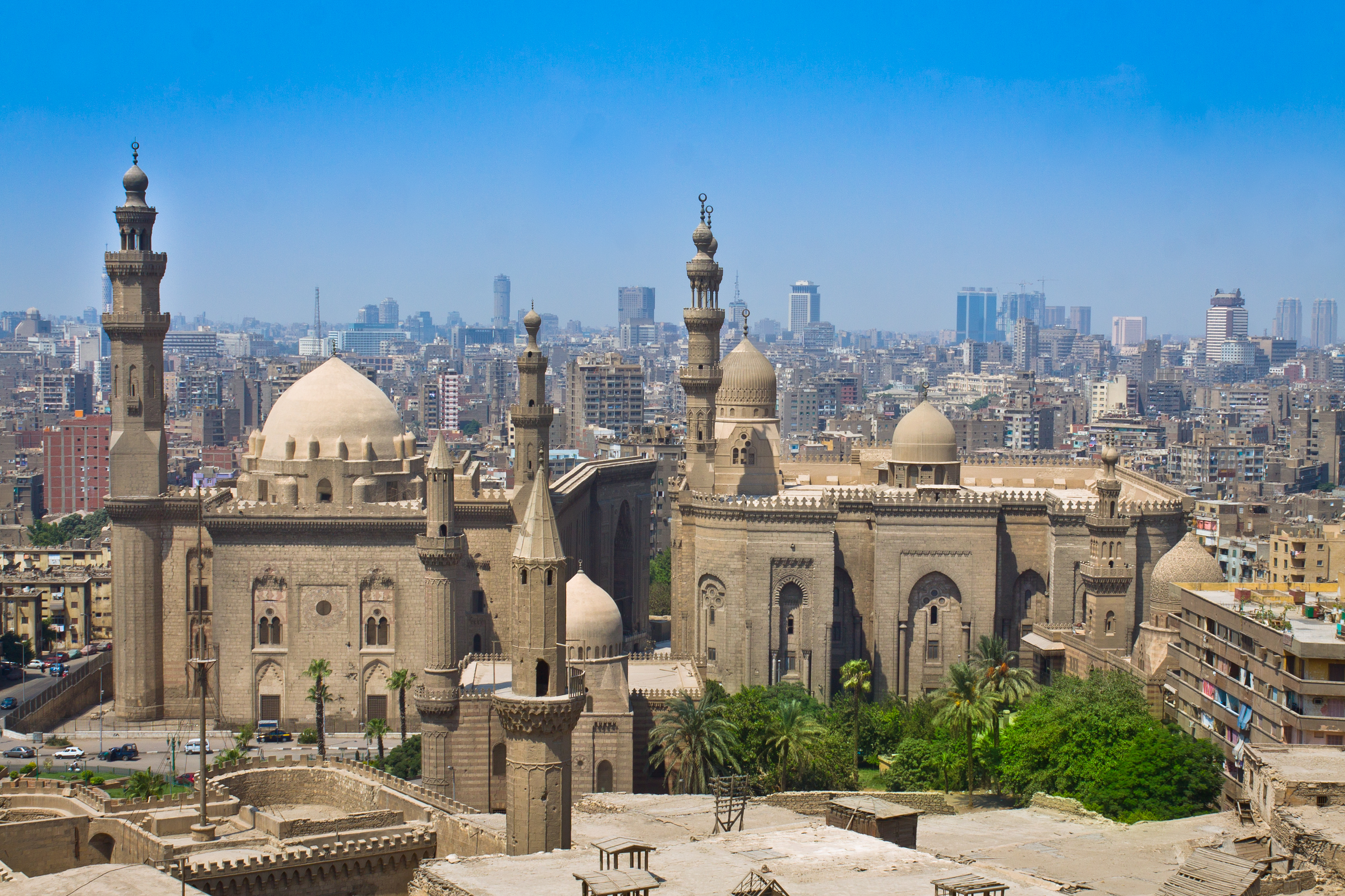
Mosques in Cairo

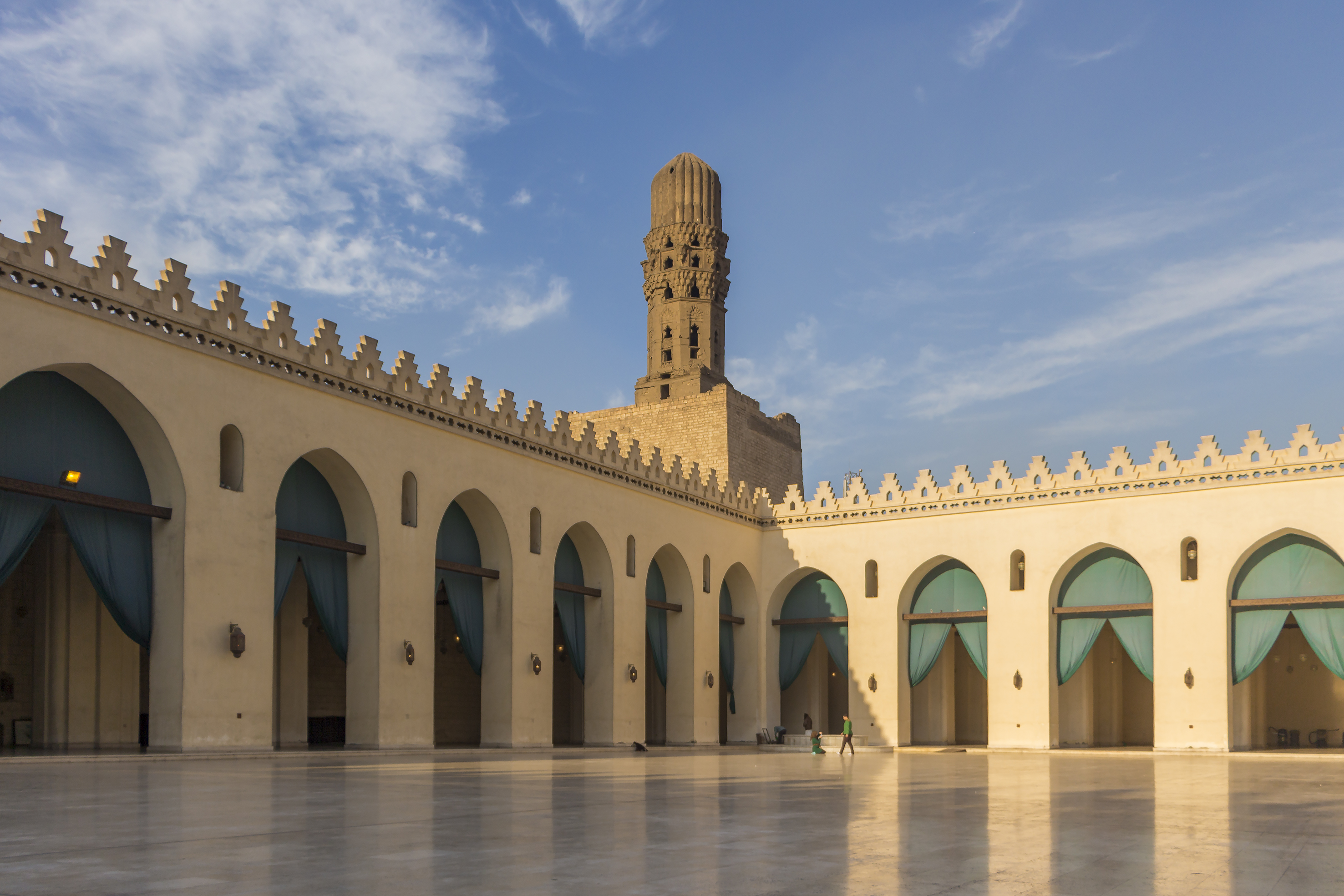
Al-Hakim Mosque

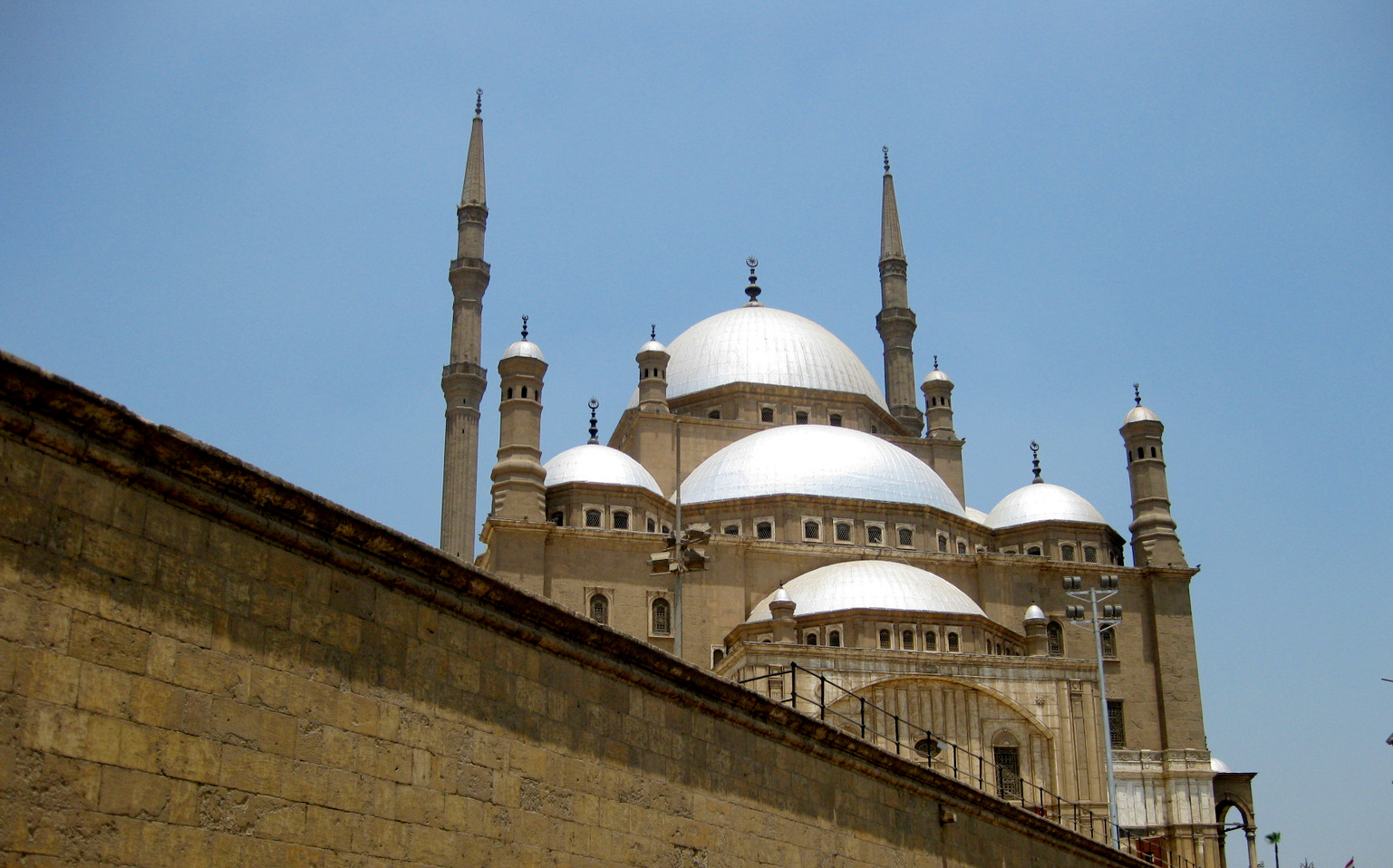
Mosque of Muhammad Ali

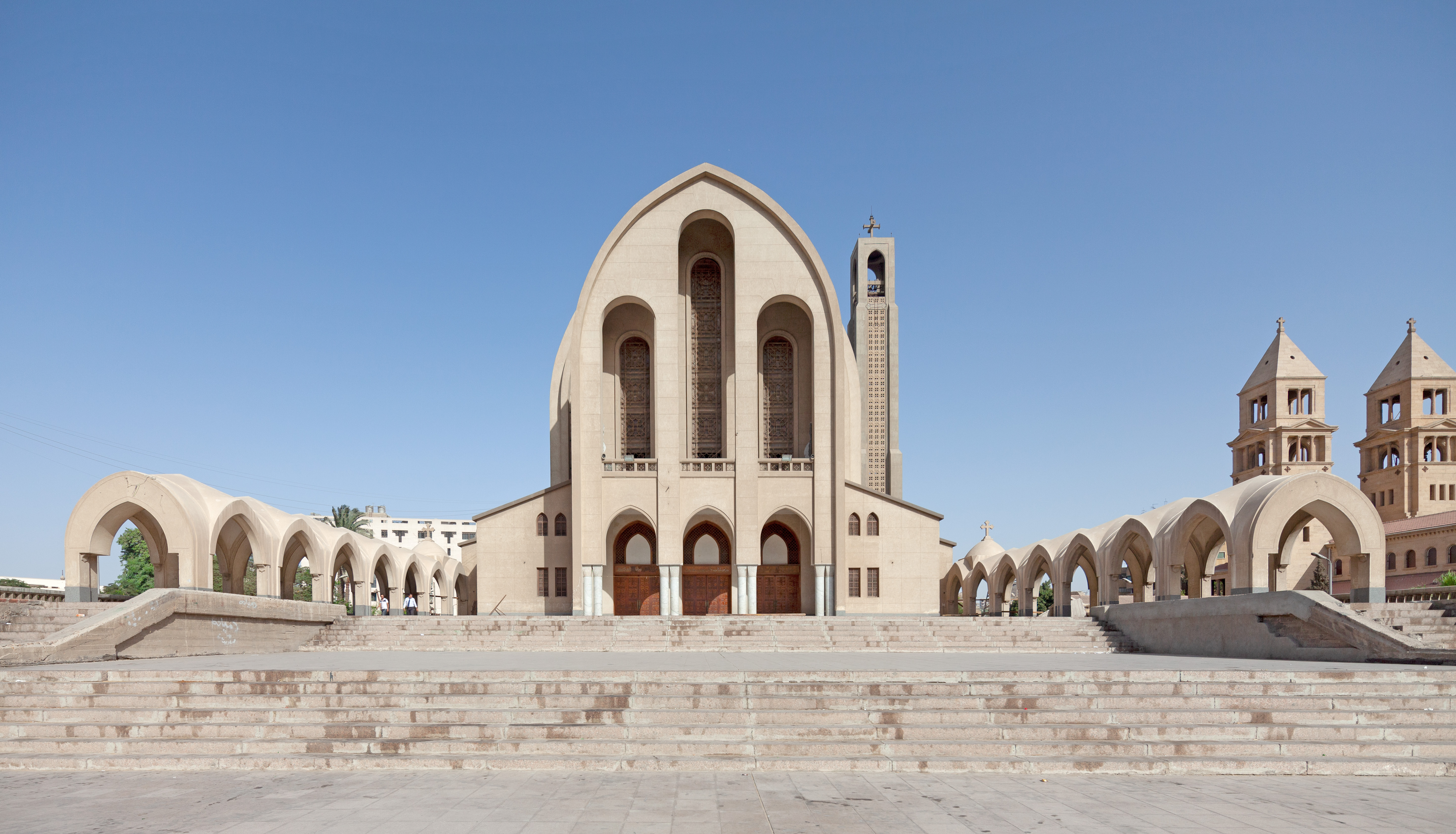
The Saint Mark's Coptic Orthodox Cathedral

Mosques in Cairo

- Al-Azhar Mosque
- Al-Hakim Mosque
- All Saints' Cathedral
- Church of St. George
- Complex of Sultan al-Ashraf Qaytbay
- The Hanging Church
- Mashhad of Sayyida Ruqayya
- Mosque of Amr ibn al-As
- Mosque of Ibn Tulun
- Mosque of Muhammad Ali
- Muhammad Bek Abu El Dahab Complex
- Saint Mark's Coptic Orthodox Cathedral
- St. Peter and St. Paul's Church

==== Secular buildings in Cairo ====
- Bank Misr Building
- Belmont Building
- Headquarters of the Arab League
- Khanqah of Baybars II
- Madrassa of Al-Nasir Muhammad
- Madrasa of Sarghatmish
- Maspero television building
- The Mogamma
- Qalawun complex
- Ramses Exchange
- Sabil-Kuttab of Katkhuda
- Sabil-Kuttab-Wakala of Sultan Qa'it Bay
- Sultan Al-Ghuri Complex
- Wakala al-Sultan Qaytbay
- Wikala of Al-Ghuri
- Yacoubian Building

==== Streets in Cairo ====
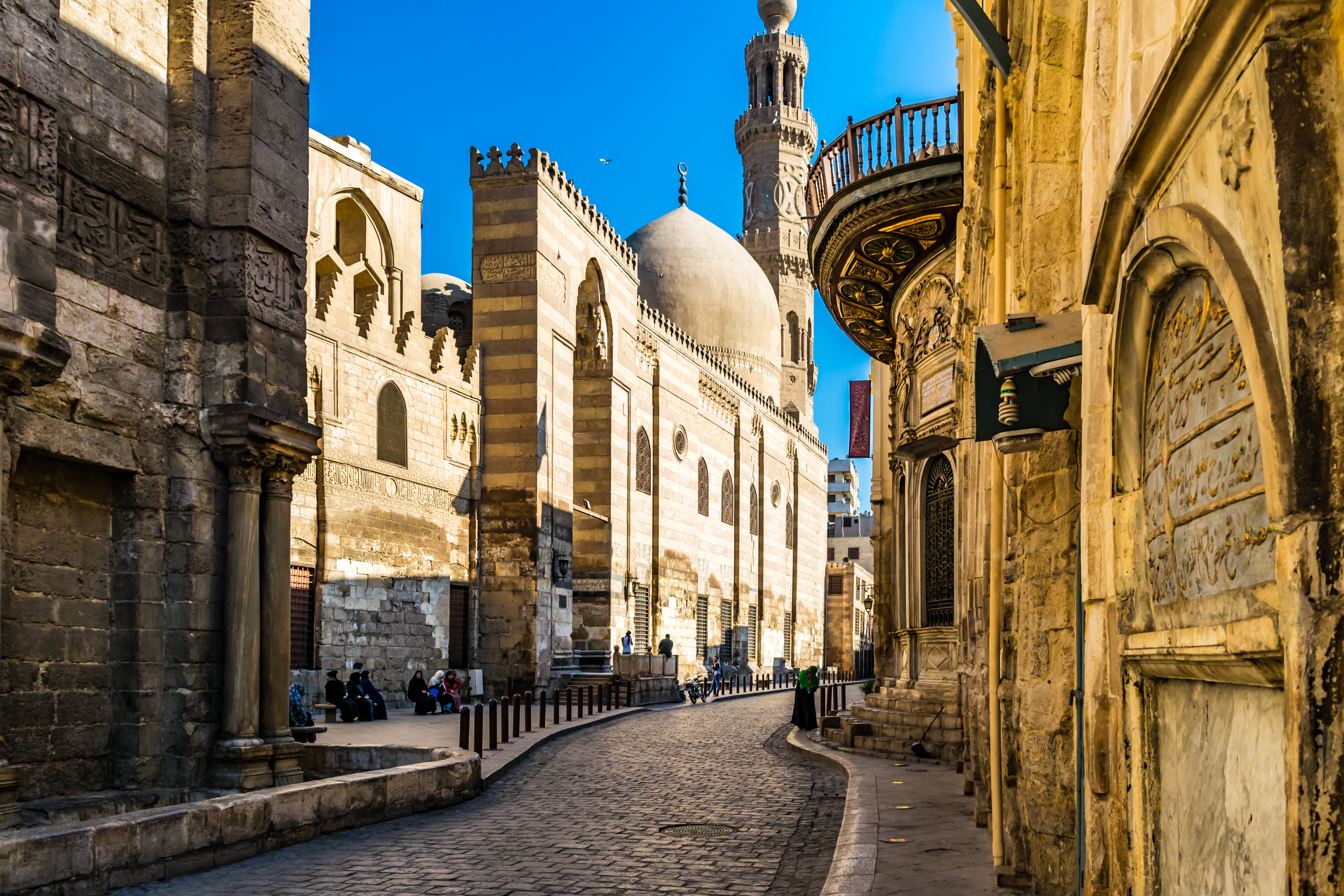
Muizz Street

- Muizz Street
- Qasr El Eyni Street
- Qasr El Nil Street
- Saliba Street
- Talaat Harb Street

==== Theatres in Cairo ====
- Cairo Opera House

==== Towers in Cairo ====
- Cairo Tower

=== Demographics of Cairo ===
Demographics of Cairo

== Government and politics of Cairo ==
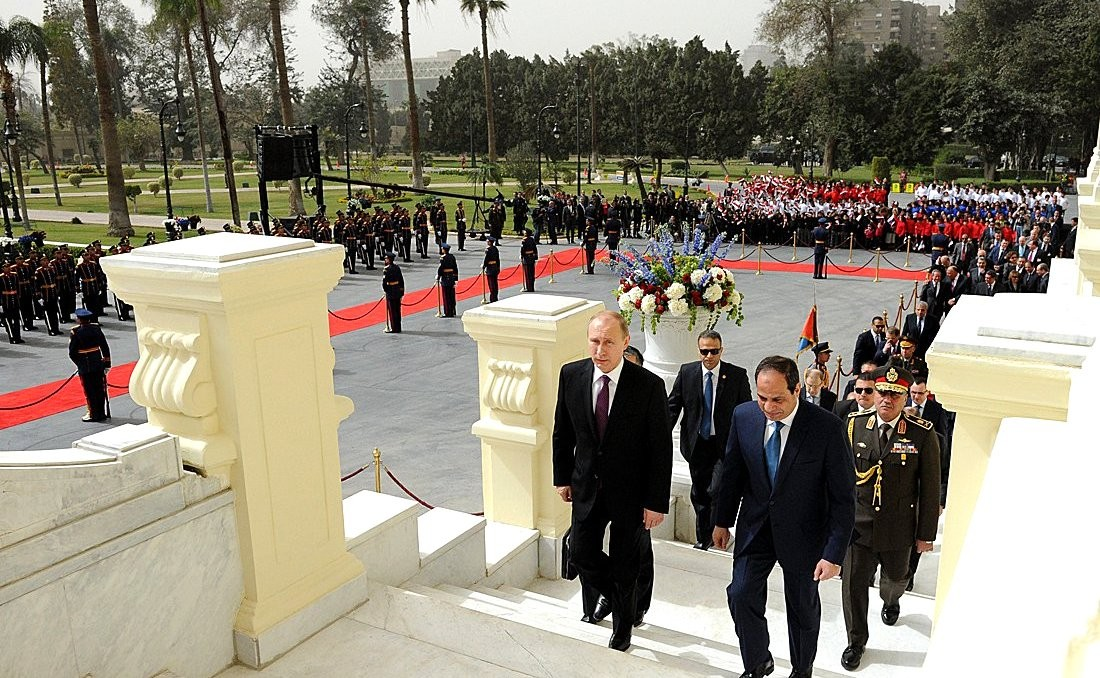
Abdel Fattah el-Sisi and Vladimir Putin at the Heliopolis Palace, 2015

Politics of Cairo

- International relations of Cairo
  - Twin towns and sister cities of Cairo

=== Law and order in Cairo ===
- Law enforcement in Cairo
  - Egyptian National Police

== History of Cairo ==
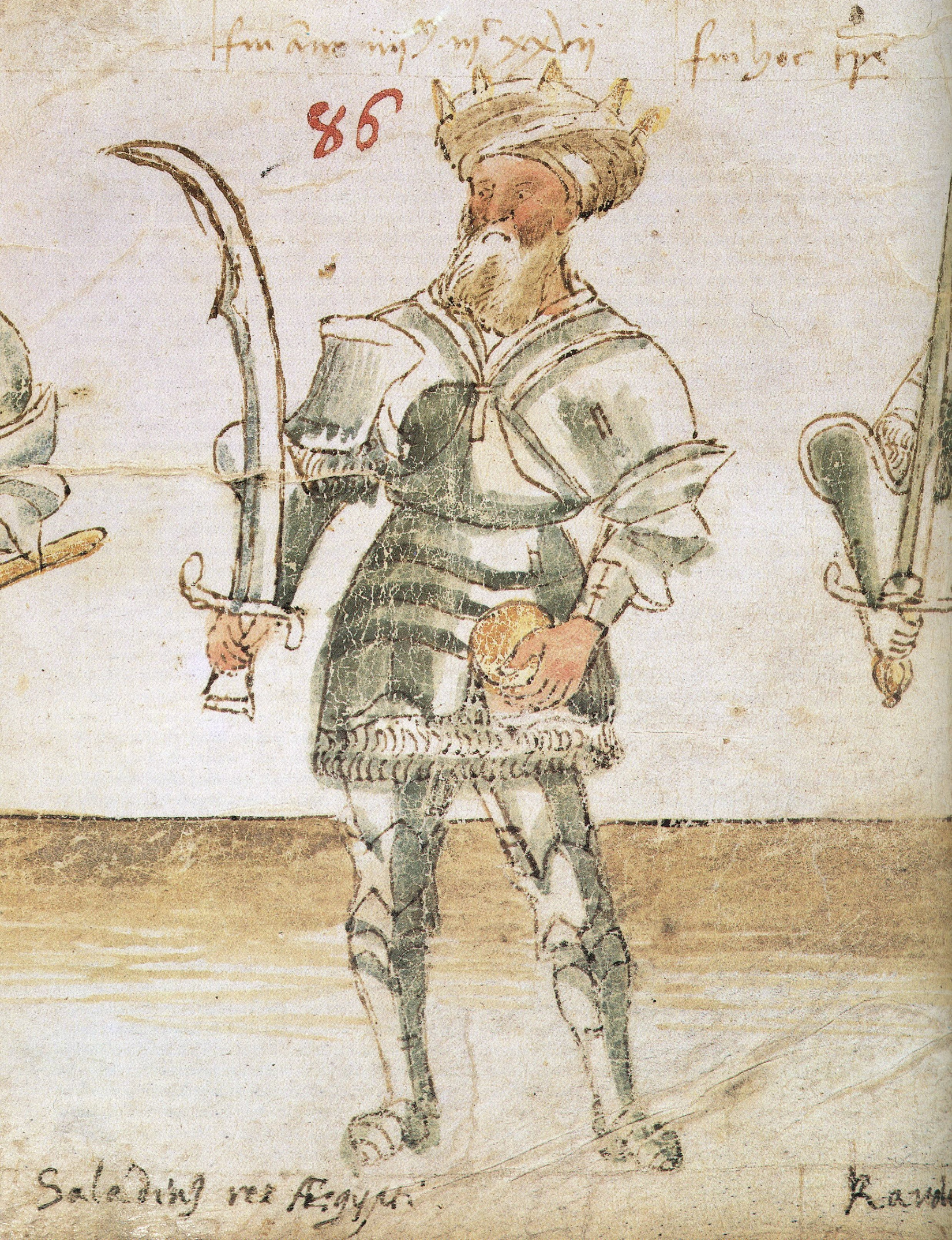
Saladin rex Aegypti, from a 15th-century manuscript

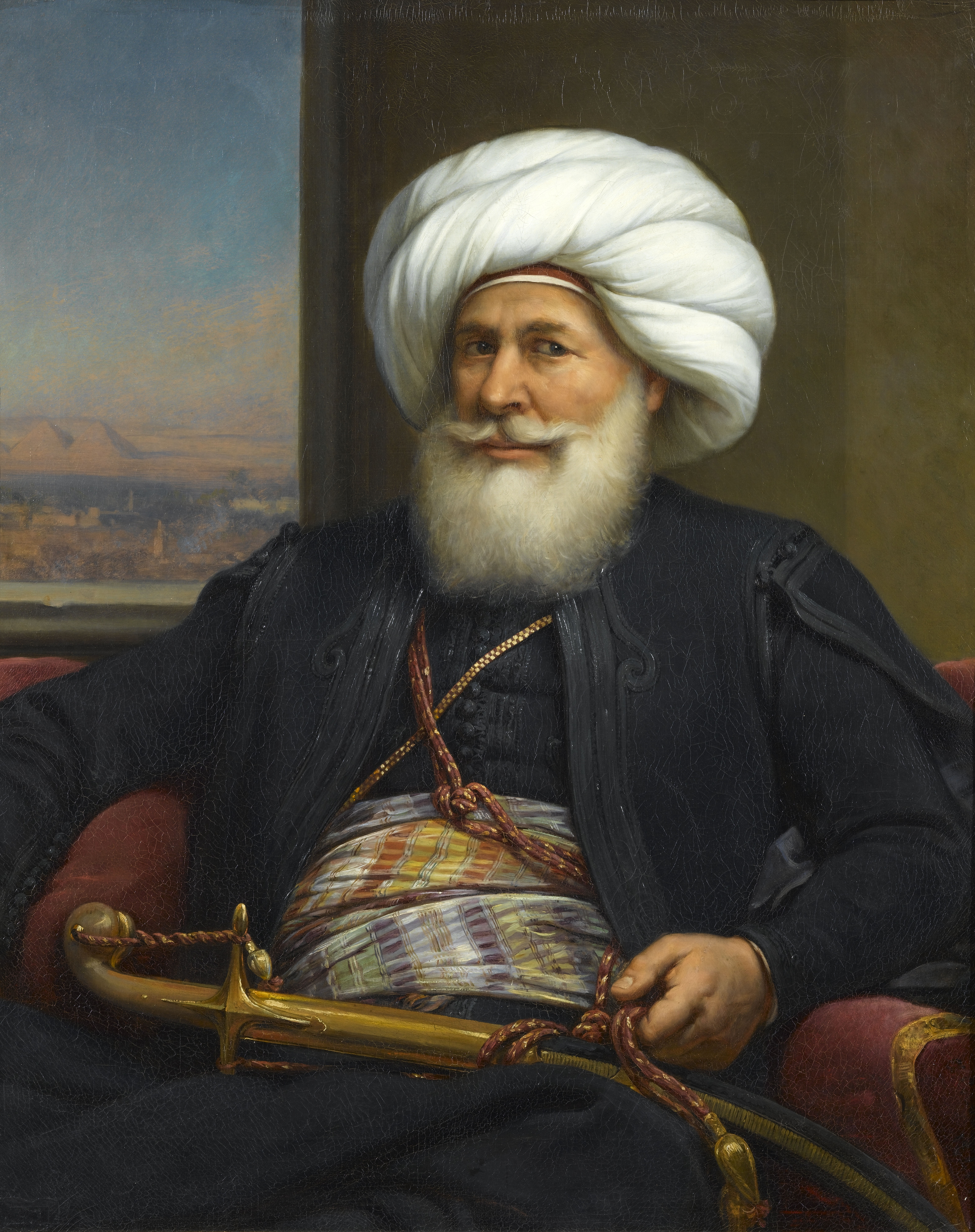
Muhammad Ali Pasha, founder of modern Egypt

History of Cairo

=== History of Cairo, by period or event ===
Timeline of Cairo

- Prehistory and origin of Cairo
  - The Romans establish a fortress town on the east bank of the Nile river (1st century)
- Medieval Cairo
  - The town is conquered by the Muslims and the conquerors settle to the north of the Babylon Fortress, in an area that became known as Fustat (640 AD)
  - The Fatimids found the city of Cairo in 969 as the new capital of the Fatimid caliphate in Egypt. The Caliph Al-Mu'izz li-Din Allah gives Cairo its present name, al-Qāhiratu (The Victorious) (973)
  - Egypt's capital moves from Fustat to Cairo (1168)
  - Saladin, the first Sultan of Egypt, establishes the Ayyubid dynasty, based in Cairo (1174)
  - The Mamluks seize control of Egypt and the city becomes capital of the Mamluk Sultanate (1250)
- Cairo under the Ottoman rule
  - Capture of Cairo. Cairo's political influence diminishes after the Ottomans supplant Mamluk power over Egypt (1517)
  - Under the Ottomans, Cairo expands south and west from its center around the Citadel
- Modern Cairo (1863–present)
  - British invasion (1882)
  - Egypt's independence (1922)
  - Egyptian revolution of 1952
  - Egyptian revolution of 2011
  - Plans are announced for a yet-unnamed city to be built further east of New Cairo, intended to serve as the new capital of Egypt (2015)

=== History of Cairo, by subject ===
- Abdeen Palace incident of 1942
- Cairo fire
- Siege of Cairo

== Culture of Cairo ==
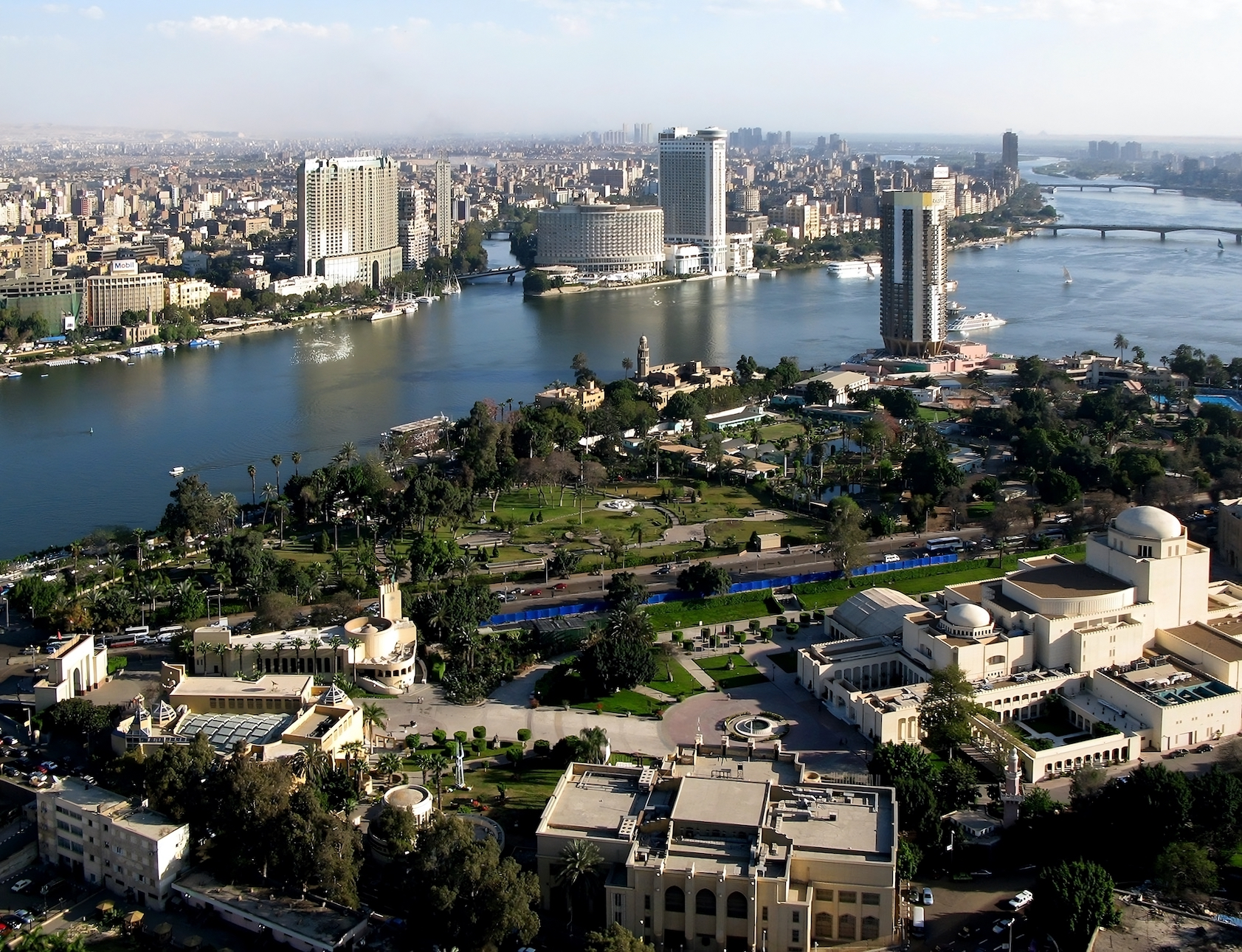
Modern architecture of Cairo

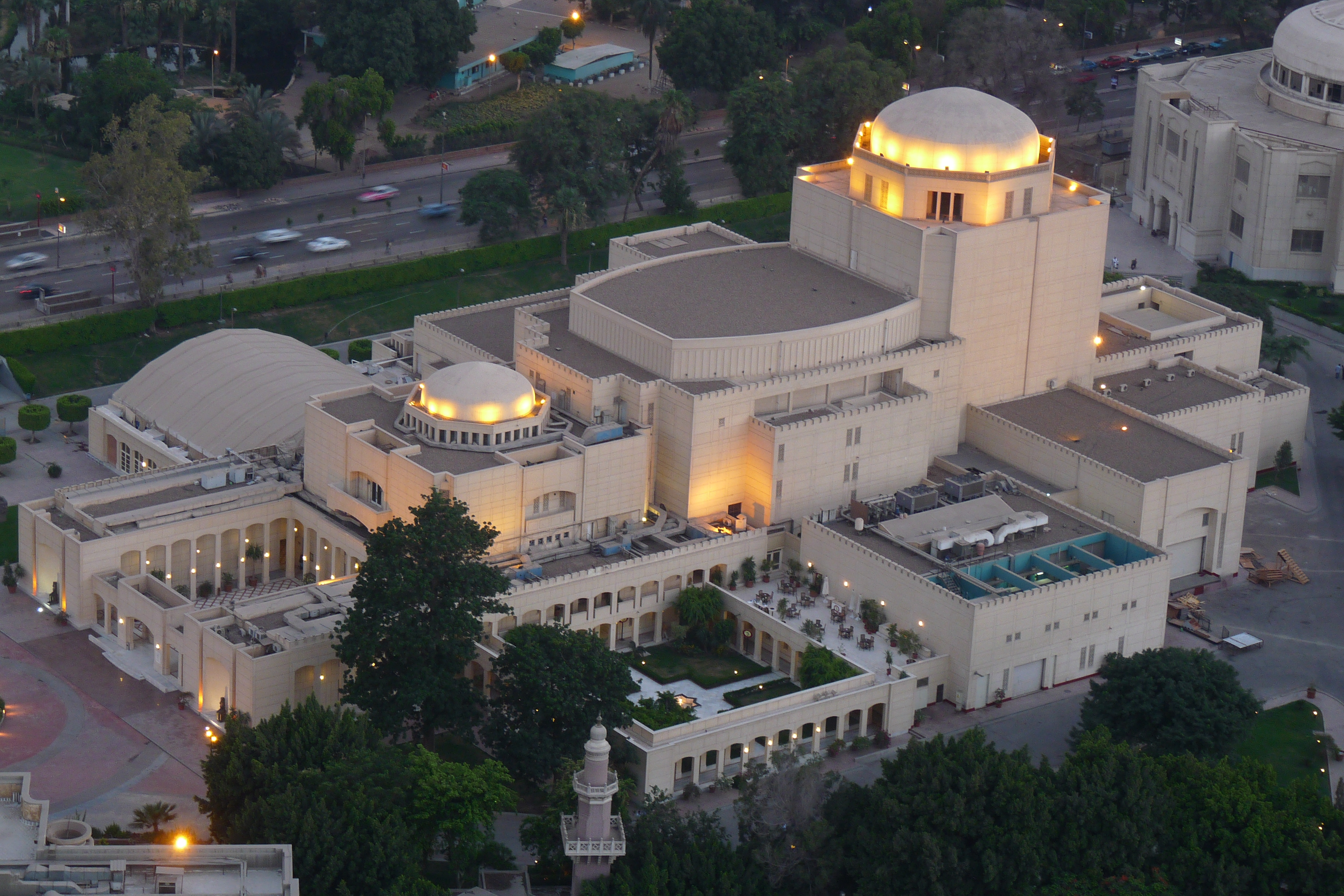
Cairo Opera House, a landmark in the cultural landscape of Egypt and the Middle East

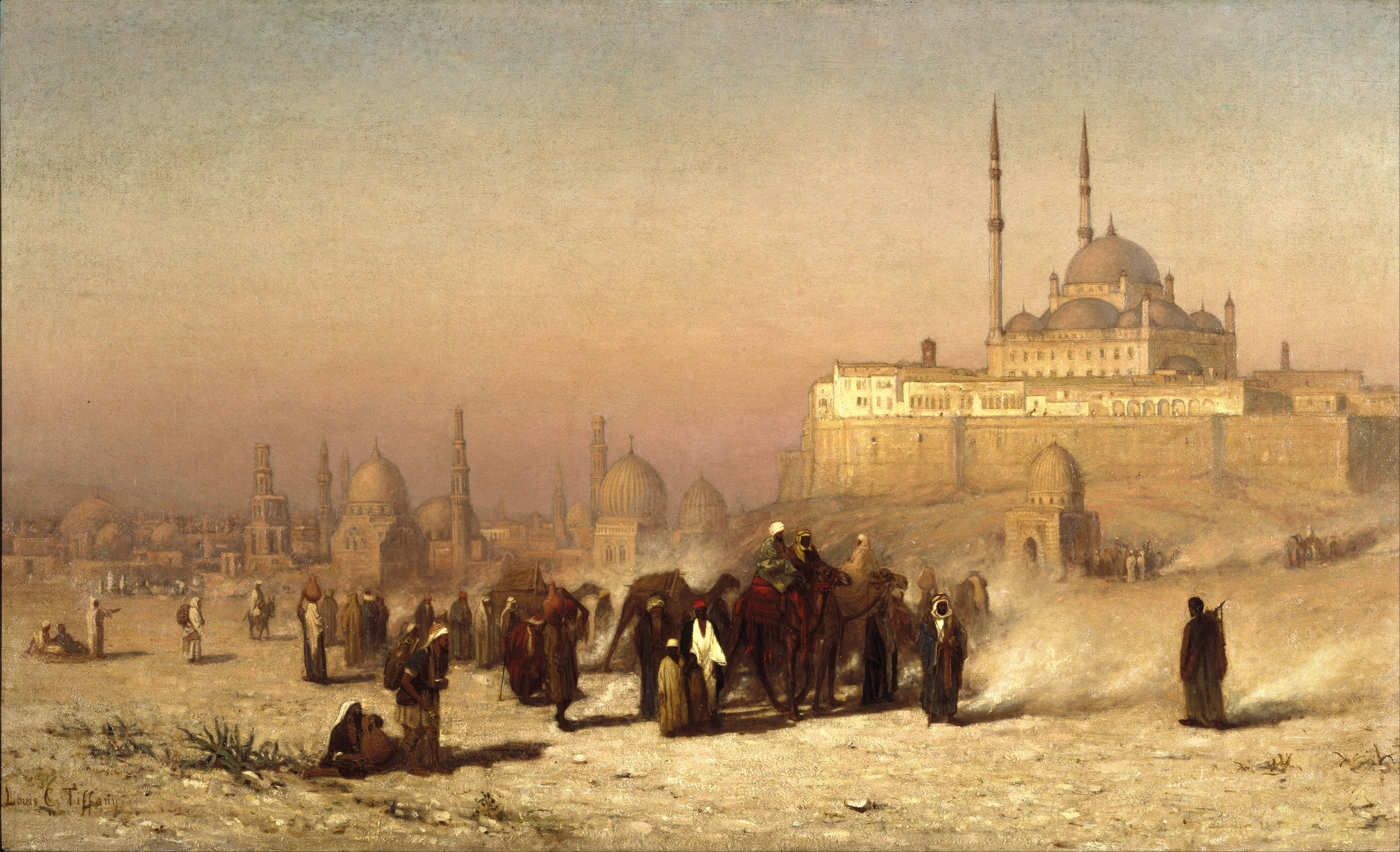
On the Way between Old and New Cairo, Citadel Mosque of Mohammed Ali, and Tombs of the Mamelukes (1872) by Louis Comfort Tiffany, Brooklyn Museum

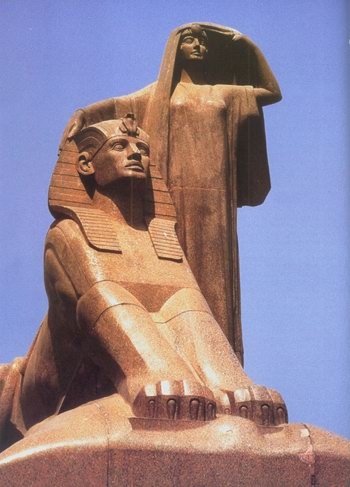
Mahmoud Mokhtar's Egypt's Renaissance (1919–1928), Cairo University Gate

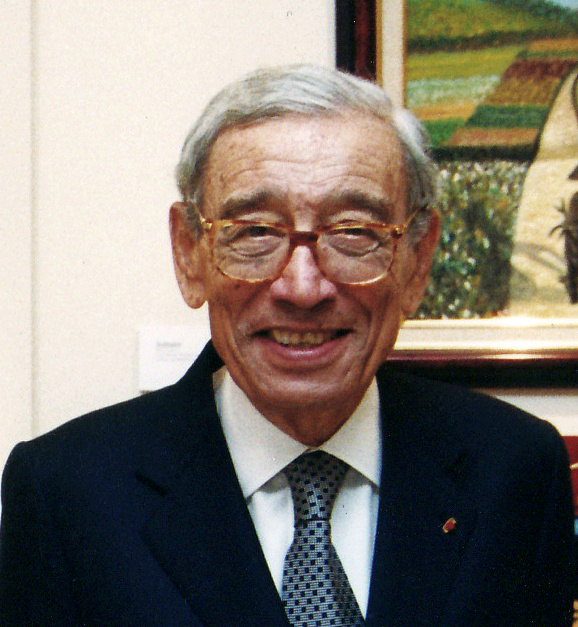
Boutros Boutros-Ghali, Secretary-General of the United Nations (UN) from 1992 to 1996

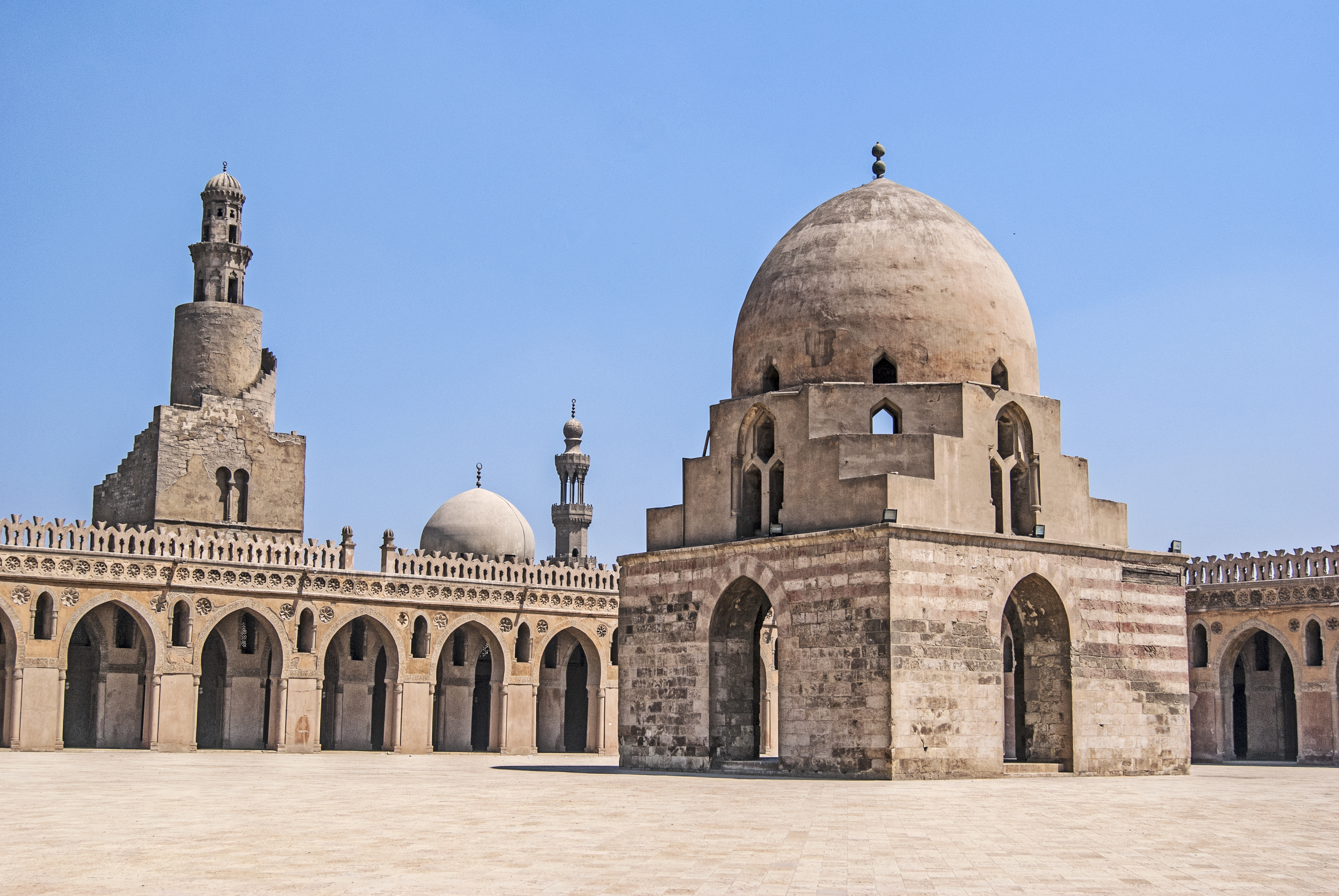
Mosque of Ibn Tulun, the oldest mosque in Cairo

Culture of Cairo

=== Arts in Cairo ===
==== Architecture of Cairo ====
- Buildings in Cairo
  - Tallest buildings in Cairo
- Residential Architecture in Historic Cairo

==== Cinema of Cairo ====
- Cairo Higher Institute of Cinema
- Cairo International Film Festival
  - 34th Cairo International Film Festival

==== Music and dance of Cairo ====
- Ballet of Cairo
  - Cairo Contemporary Dance Center
  - Cairo Opera Ballet Company
  - Higher Institute of Ballet
- Music festivals and competitions in Cairo
  - Cairo Congress of Arab Music
- Music schools in Cairo
  - Arabic Oud House
  - Cairo Conservatoire
- Music venues in Cairo
  - Cairo Opera House
  - Egyptian Royal Opera House
- Musical ensembles in Cairo
  - Cairo Symphony Orchestra
- Musicians from Cairo
  - Gamal Abdel-Rahim
  - Rageh Daoud
  - Yusef Greiss

==== Visual arts of Cairo ====
- Public art in Cairo
  - Egypt's Renaissance

Cuisine of Cairo

- Ful medames

Events in Cairo

- Cairo International Book Fair

Languages of Cairo

- Egyptian Arabic
- Coptic

Media in Cairo

- Newspapers in Cairo
  - Al-Ahram
  - Egypt Today
- Radio and television in Cairo
  - Egyptian Radio

People of Cairo

- People from Cairo
  - Boutros Boutros-Ghali
  - Naguib Mahfouz
  - Roland Moreno

=== Religion in Cairo ===
Religion in Cairo

- Sunni Islam
- Oriental Orthodoxy
  - Coptic Orthodox Church of Alexandria

=== Sports in Cairo ===
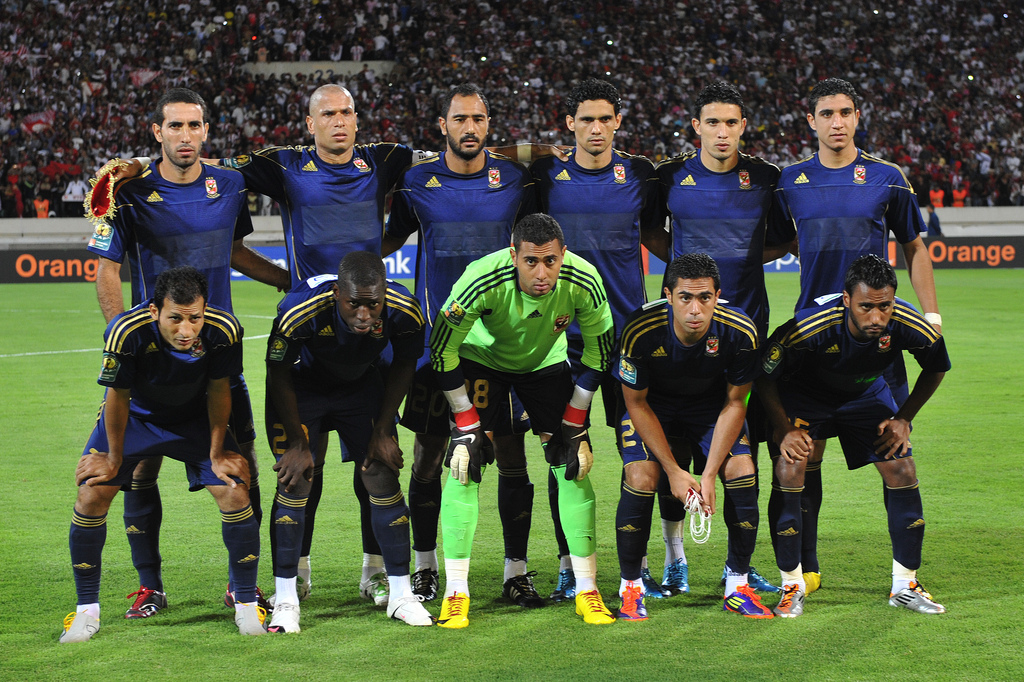
Al Ahly team in 2011

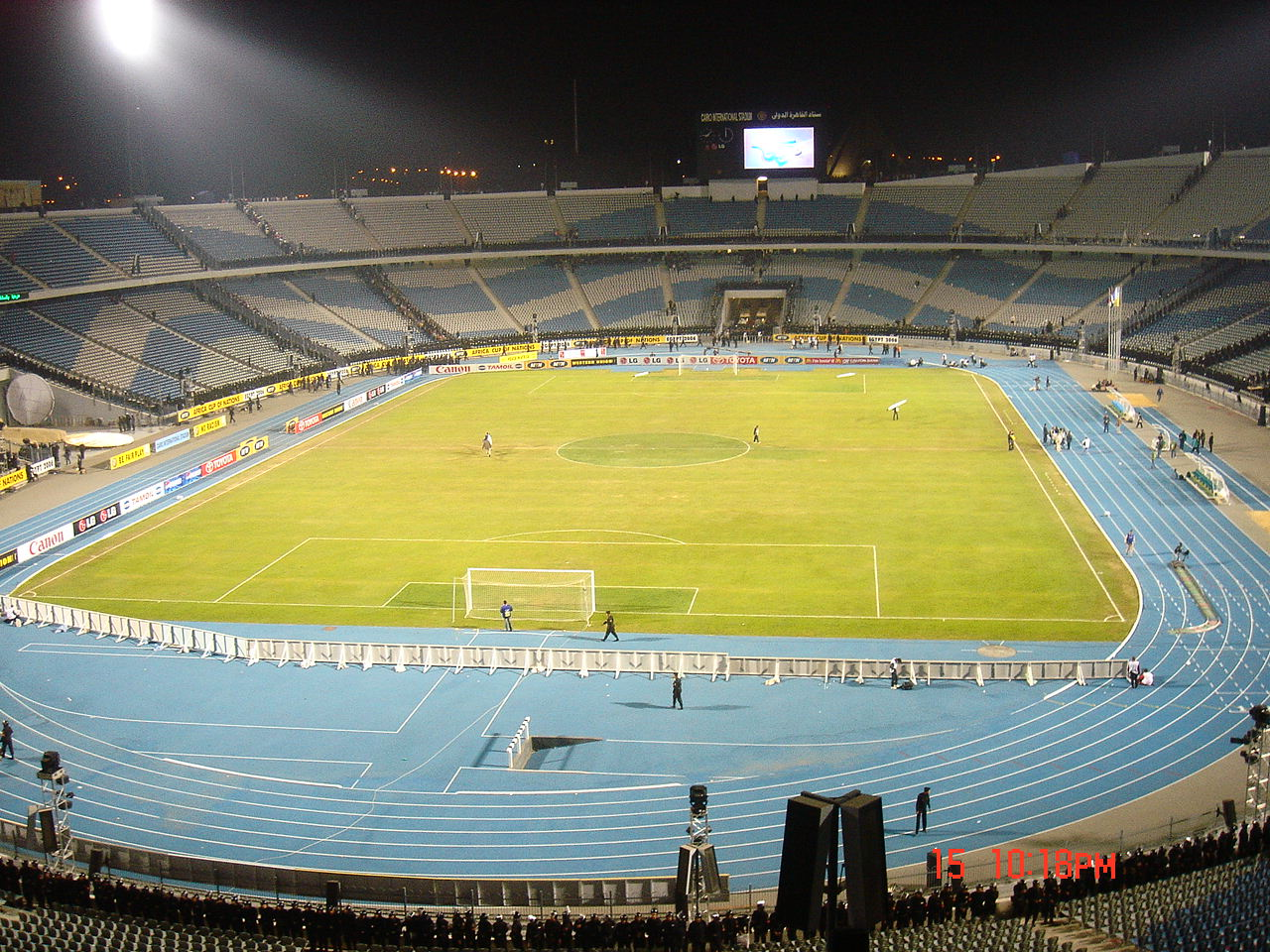
Cairo International Stadium

Sports in Cairo

- Football in Cairo
  - Association football in Cairo
    - Cairo derby
      - Al Ahly SC
      - Zamalek SC
- Sports competitions in Cairo
  - 2006 Africa Cup of Nations
  - 2007 Pan Arab Games
  - Rallye des Pharaons
- Sports venues in Cairo
  - 30 June Stadium
  - Al Ahly Sports Hall
  - Al-Salam Stadium
  - Cairo International Stadium
  - Cairo Military Academy Stadium
  - Cairo Stadium Indoor Halls Complex
  - El Marg Stadium

== Economy and infrastructure of Cairo ==
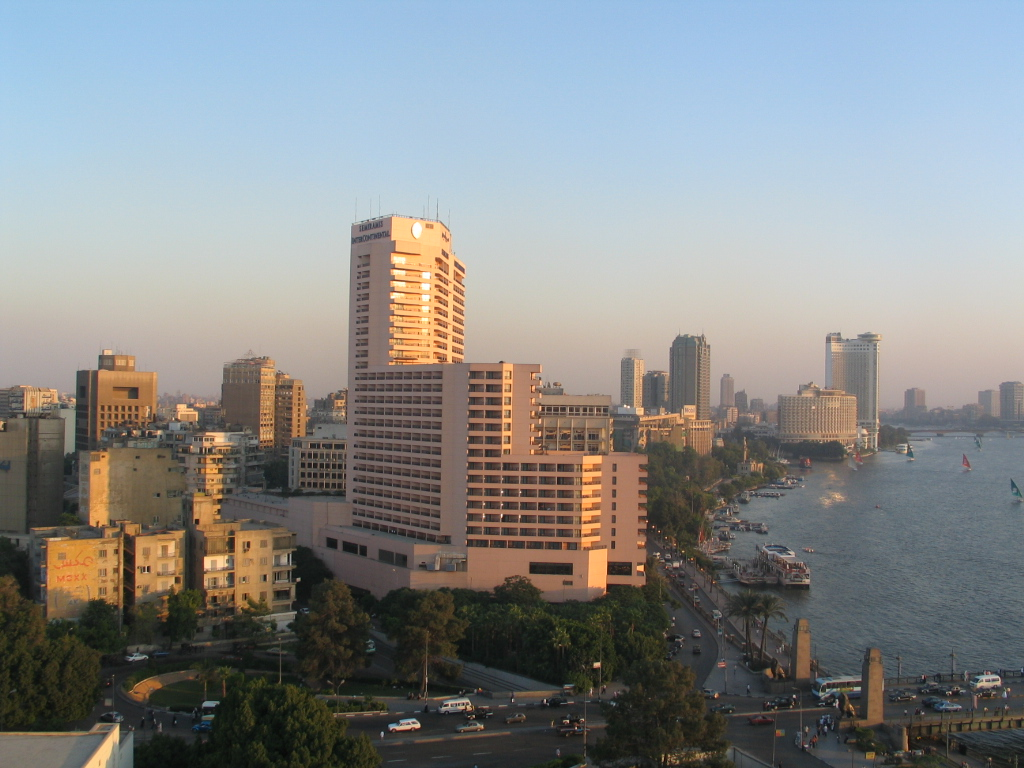
The Semiramis InterContinental Hotel

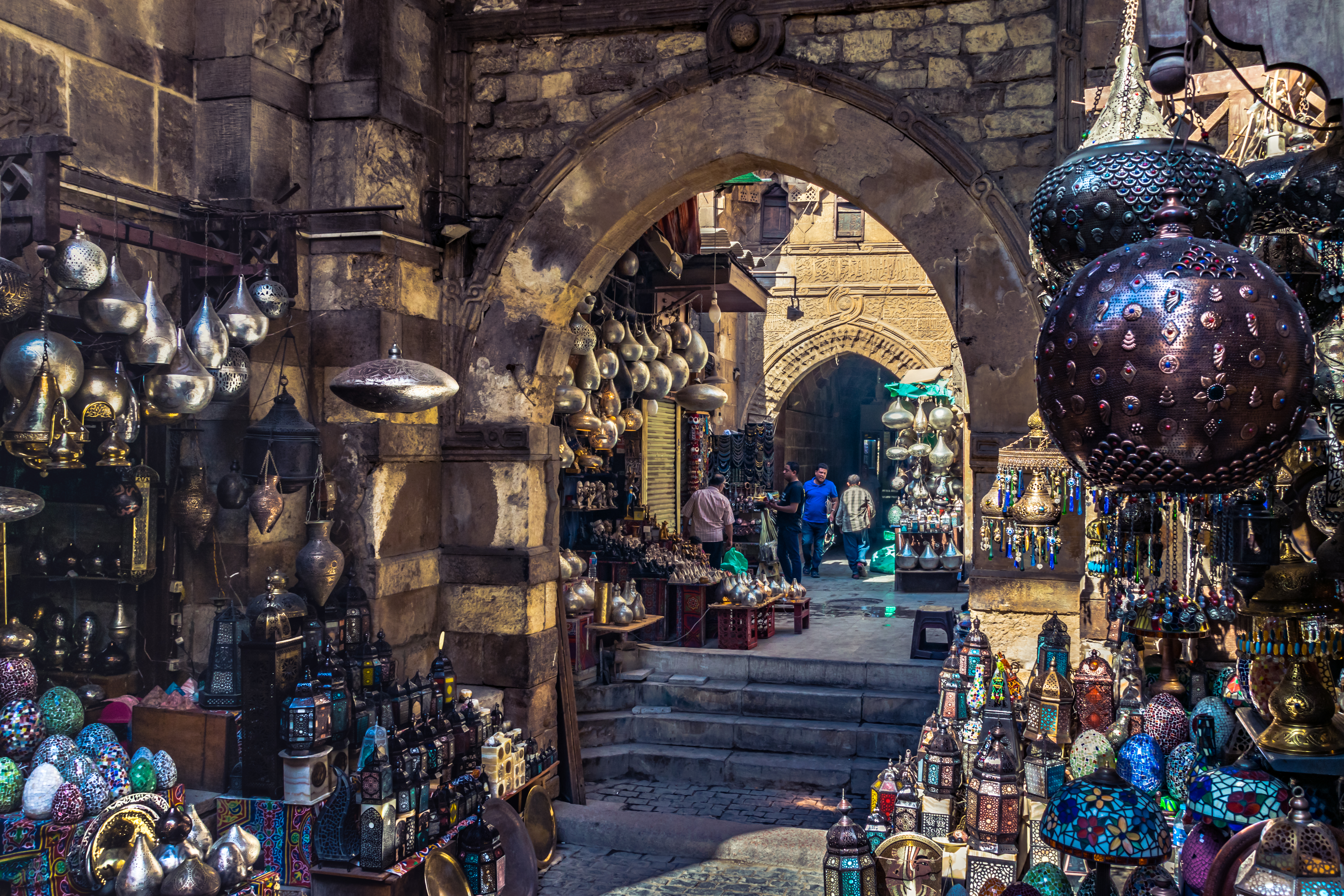
A major souk in the historic center of Islamic Cairo, Khan el-Khalili

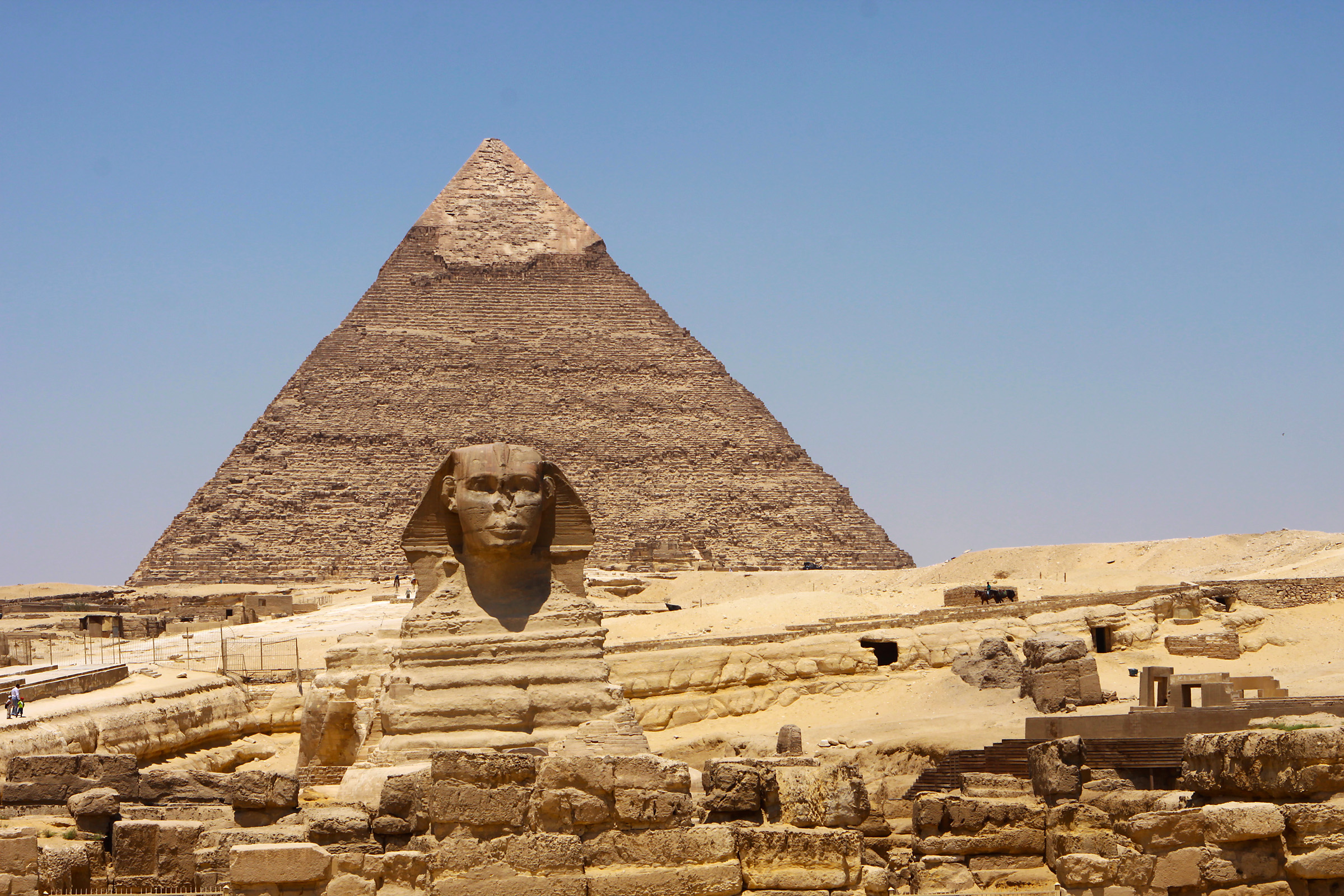
Giza pyramid complex, a most popular tourist attraction

Economy of Cairo

- Companies in Cairo
  - Ghabbour Group
- Communications in Cairo
  - Cairo Regional Internet Exchange
- Financial services in Cairo
  - Banque du Caire
- Hotels and resorts in Cairo
  - Cairo Marriott Hotel
  - El Gezira Sheraton Hotel
  - Fairmont Nile City
  - Grand Nile Tower Hotel
  - Marriott Mena House Hotel
  - Semiramis InterContinental Hotel
  - Shepheard's Hotel
  - Windsor Hotel
- Restaurants and cafés in Cairo
  - Café Riche
- Shopping malls and markets in Cairo
  - Khan el-Khalili
  - Mall of Egypt
  - Tiba Outlet Mall
- Tourism in Cairo
  - Tourist attractions in Cairo
    - Giza pyramid complex

=== Transportation in Cairo ===
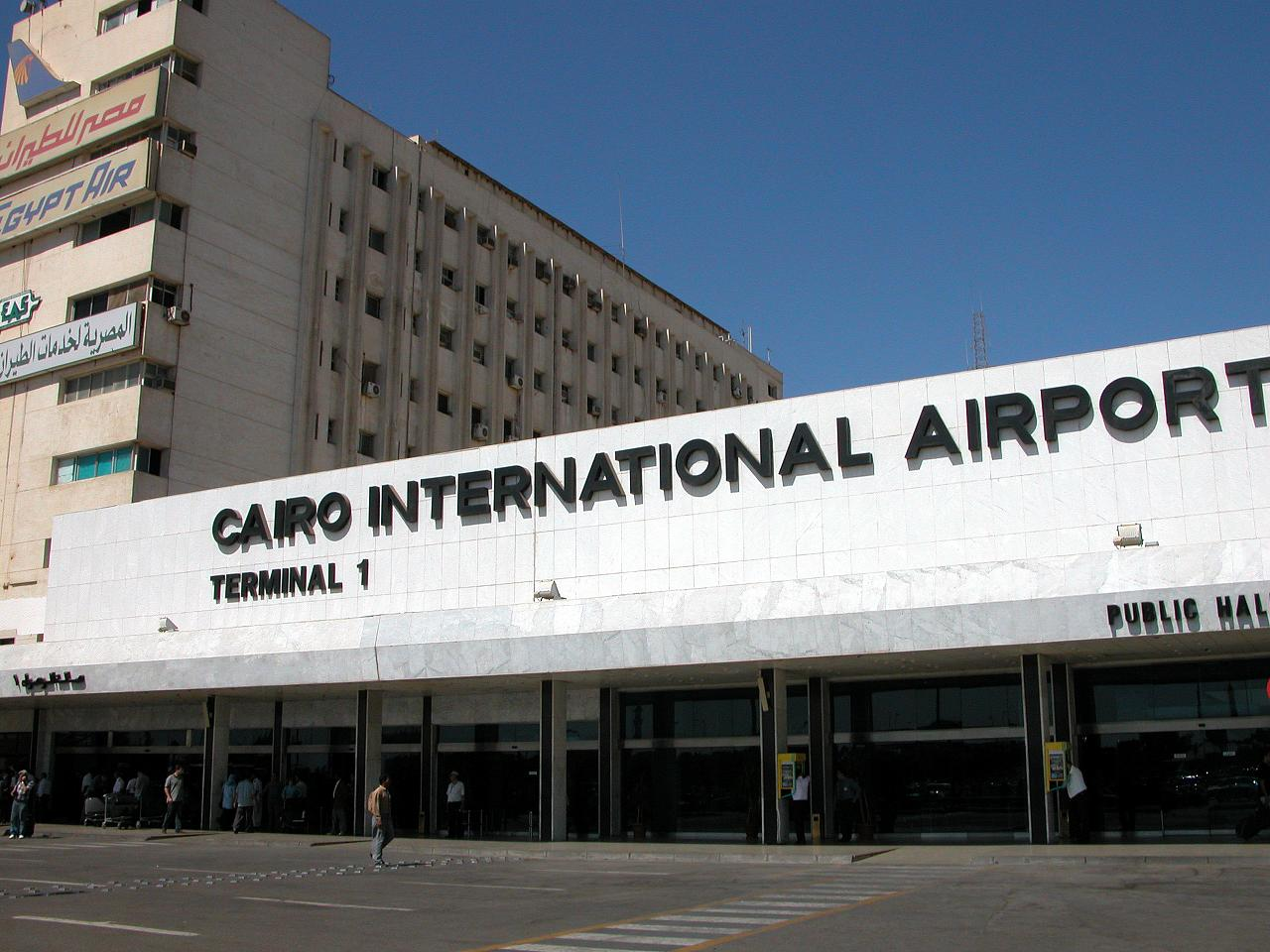
Cairo International Airport, the busiest airport in Egypt

Transport in Cairo

- Air transport in Cairo
  - Airports in Cairo
    - Cairo International Airport
- Road transport in Cairo
  - Buses in Cairo
  - Roads in Cairo
    - Ring Road

==== Rail transport in Cairo ====
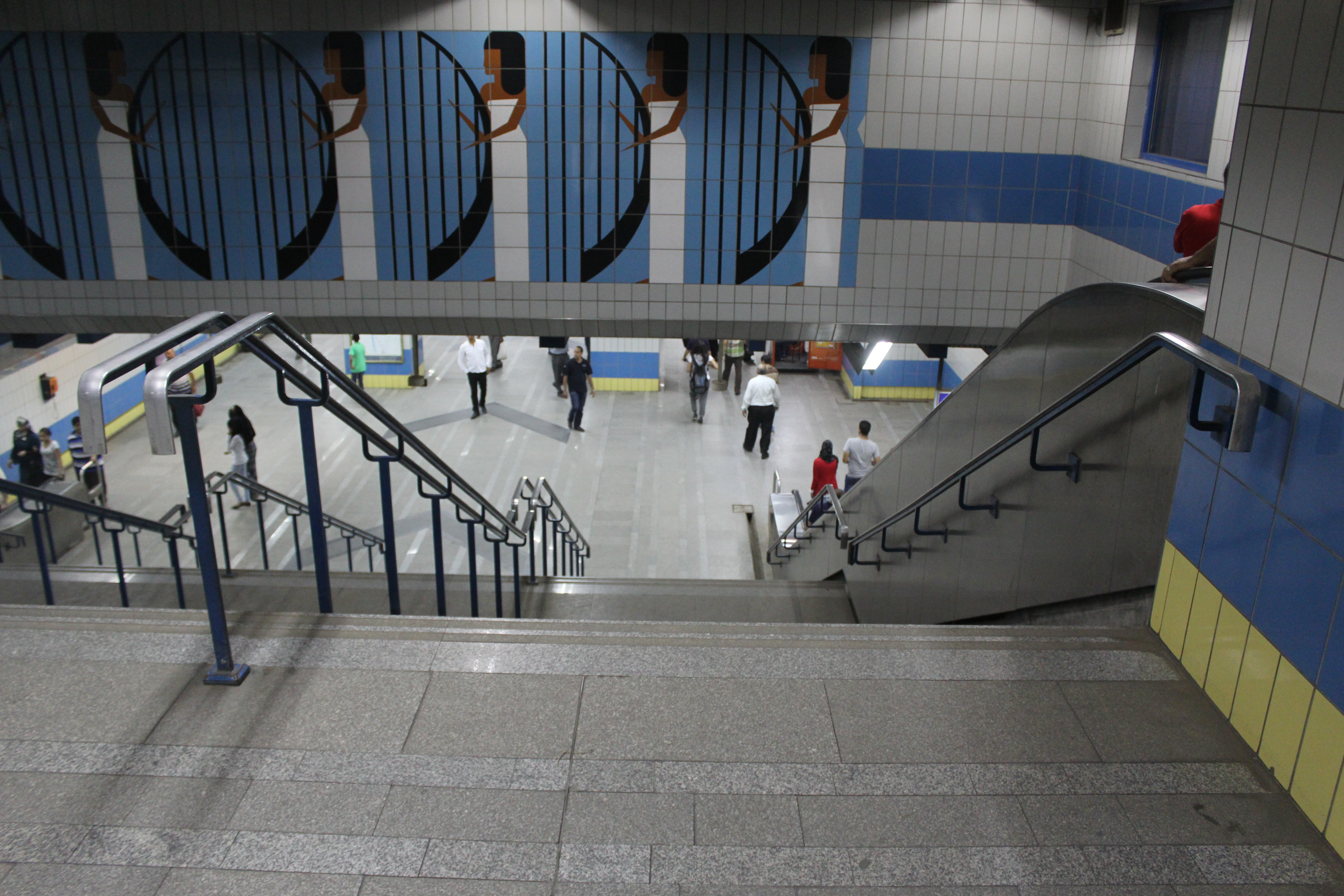
The Cairo Metro, the first of only two full-fledged metro systems in Africa

Rail transport in Cairo

- Cairo Metro
  - Lines
    - Cairo Metro Line 1
    - Cairo Metro Line 2
    - Cairo Metro Line 3
  - Stations
    - Abbassia
    - El-Marg
- Railway stations in Cairo
  - Ramses Station
- Trams in Greater Cairo

== Education in Cairo ==
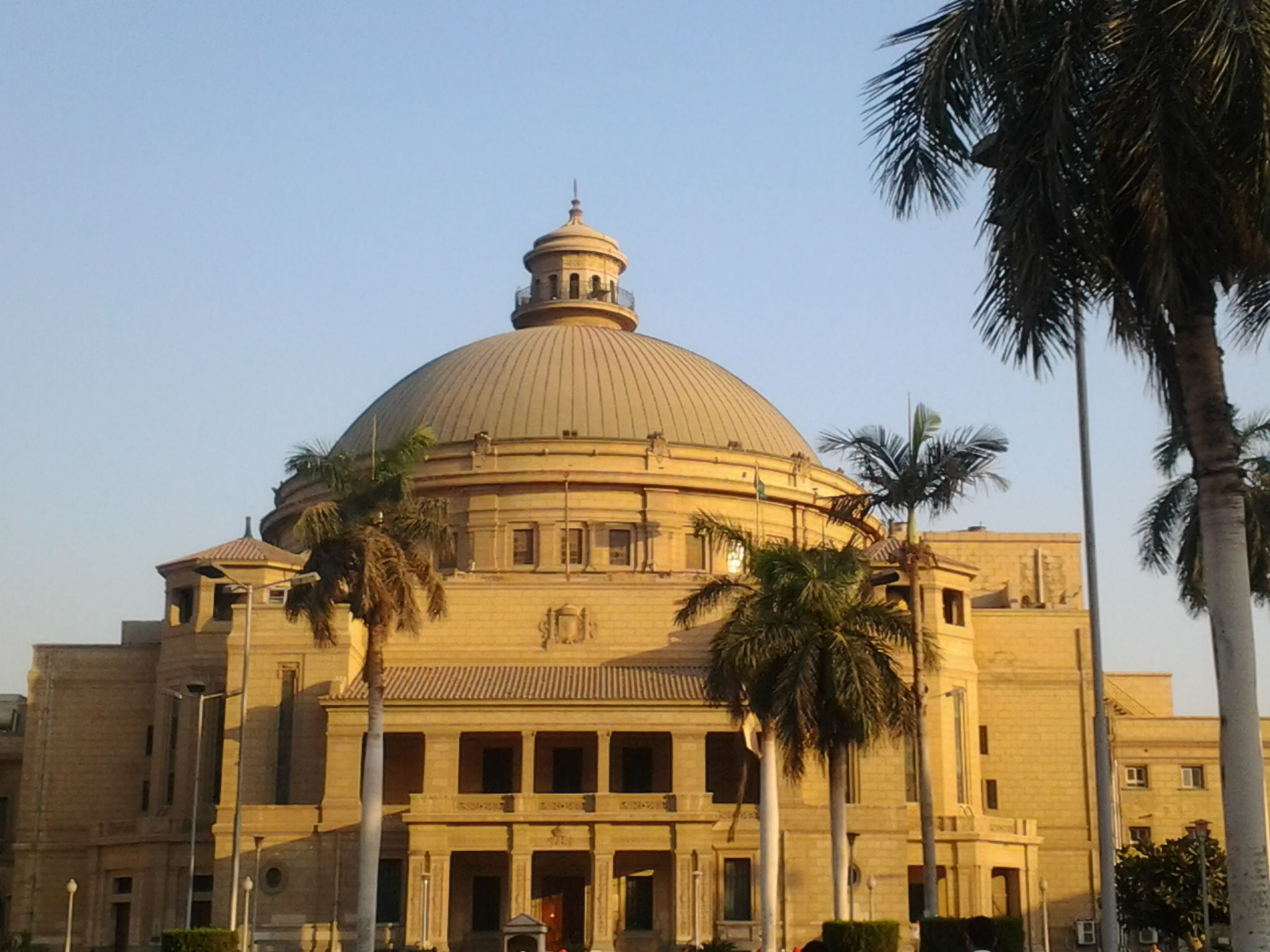
Main building of the Cairo University

Education in Cairo

- Libraries in Cairo
  - Egyptian National Library and Archives
- Universities and colleges in Cairo
  - Ain Shams University
  - Cairo University
  - French University of Egypt
  - German University in Cairo
  - October University for Modern Sciences and Arts
  - Future University in Egypt

== Healthcare in Cairo ==
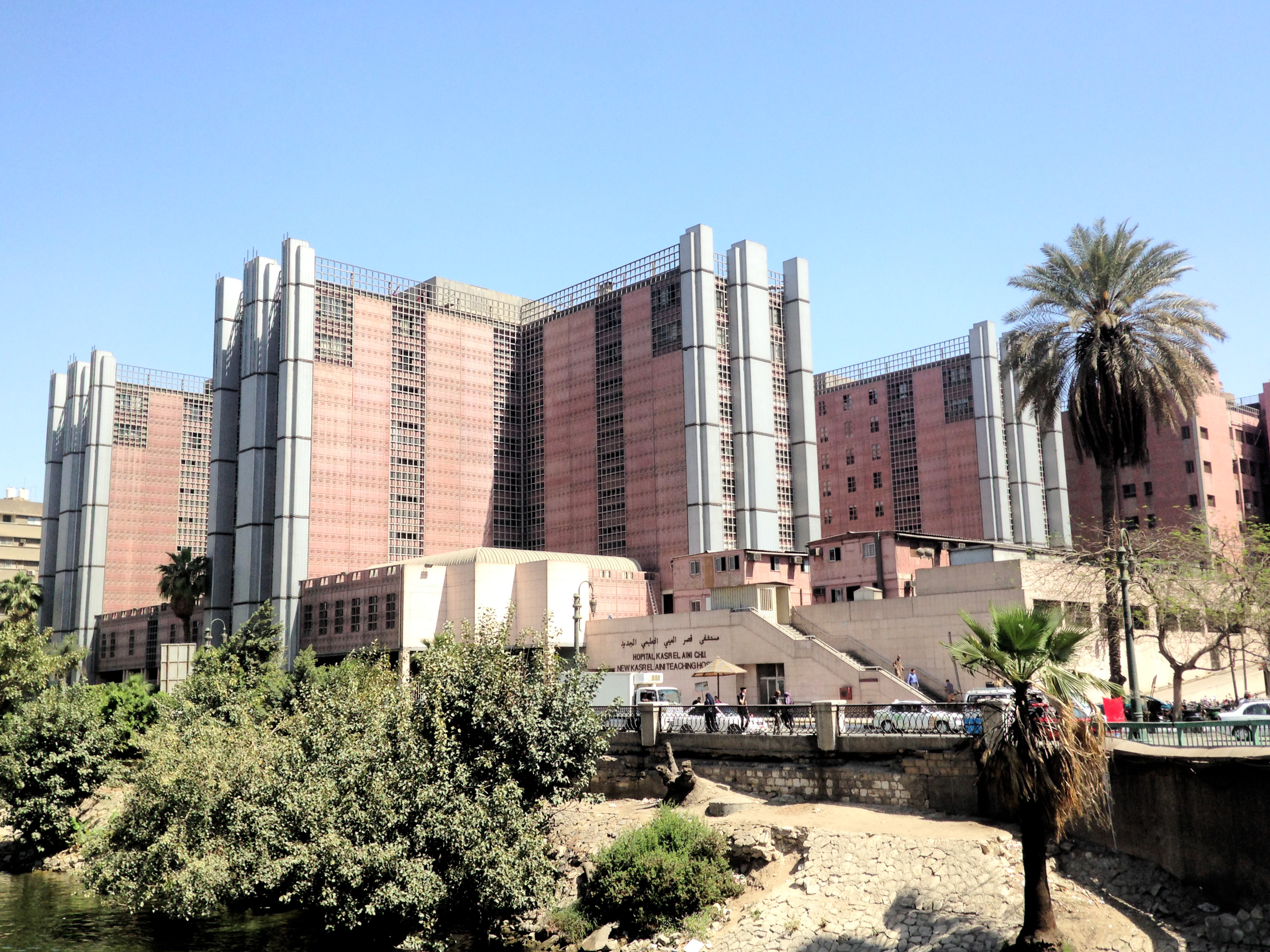
Qasr El Eyni Hospital

Healthcare in Cairo

- Hospitals in Cairo
  - 57357 Hospital
  - Coptic Hospital
  - Manshiet el Bakry Hospital
  - Nile Badrawi Hospital
  - Qasr El Eyni Hospital

== See also ==
- Outline of geography
