= Windsor Hotel (Cairo) =

Hotel in downtown Cairo, Egypt

The Windsor Hotel
- فندق وندسور; Hôtel Windsor
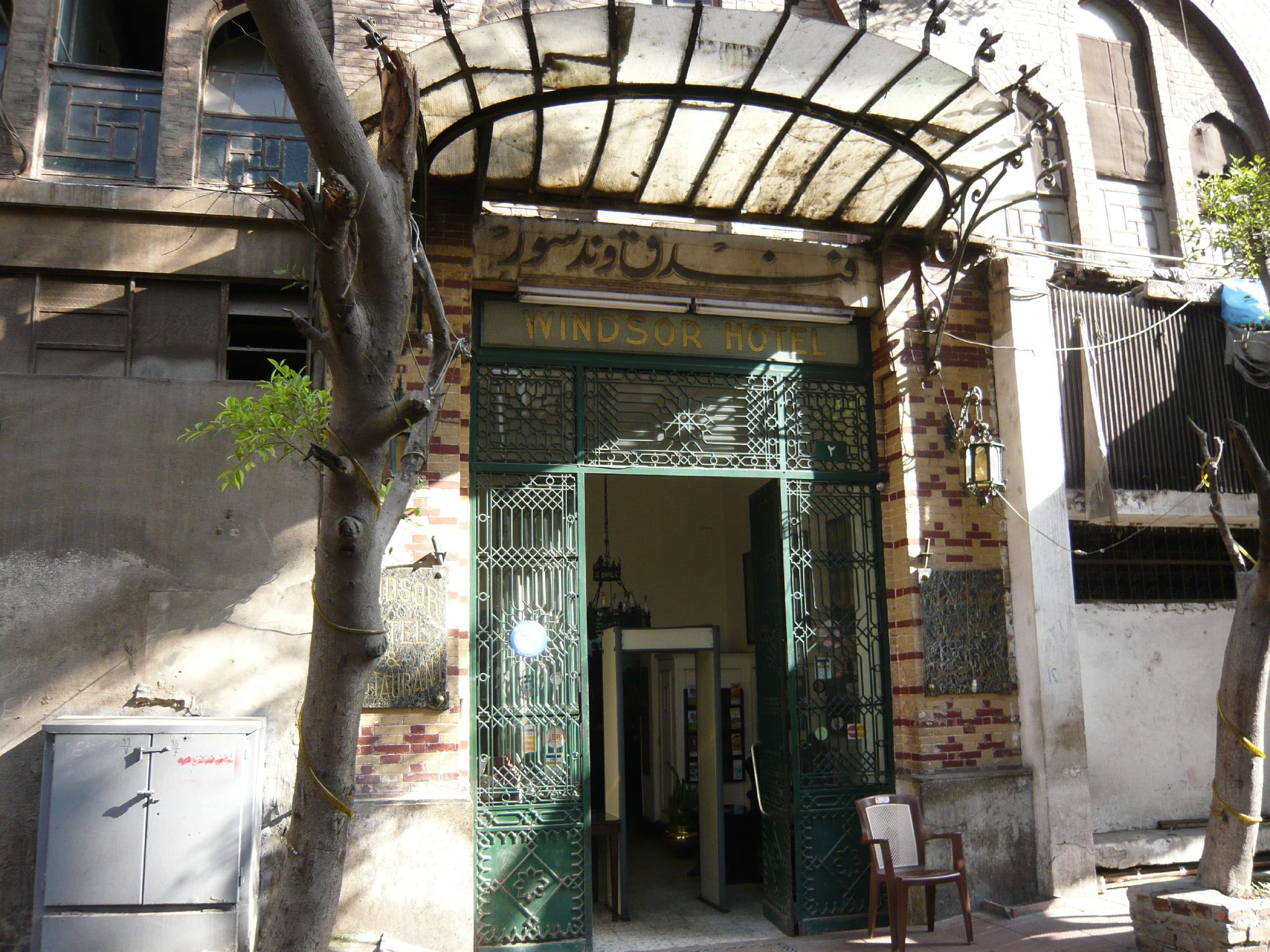
- Interactive map of the The Windsor Hotel area

General information
- Location: Cairo, Egypt, 19 Alfi Bey Street
- Coordinates: 30.053°N 31.245°E
- Inaugurated: 1893

Website
- Official website

The Windsor Hotel (فندق وندسور in Arabic, Hôtel Windsor in French) is a historic hotel in downtown Cairo, Egypt. Constructed in 1893, it is located near Opera Square and across Alfi Bey Street from the site of the former Shepheard's Hotel, of which it once served as an annex. During the First World War, it served as a British Officers Club, and much of its interior and furnishings date to this period. It has been called "an unrestored ode to the days of British colonial travel."

After suffering damage from Metro line construction, it closed for repairs in September 2019; as of February 2020, it has not yet re-opened.

== Architecture ==
Originally constructed in 1893 as part of a royal baths complex, the Windsor Hotel is an example of colonial-era neo-Mamluk architecture. Its exterior facade bears strong resemblance to the interior courtyard facades of the 16th century Wikala of El-Ghouri, a caravanserai located in the nearby Khan el-Khalili souk. It is one of the only surviving examples of Khedivial patronage in this neighborhood of Cairo, which once included the Royal Opera House, Royal Mail, and Ezbakeyyah Gardens, in addition to the hammam complex.

According to engineers at the Schindler Elevator Corporation, the Windsor's manually operated wooden carriage elevator is the oldest in Egypt and among the oldest operating elevators of its type in the world.

It features in episode two of the BBC television series “Around the World in 80 Days” featuring Monty Python star Michael Palin.
