= El Marg Stadium =

Multi-purpose stadium in Cairo, Egypt

El Marg Sports Stadium
- Full name: El Marg Sports Stadium
- Former names: El Marg Stadium
- Location: El-Marg, Cairo, Egypt
- Owner: El Marg Sports Club
- Capacity: 2,000
- Surface: Grass

Construction
- Built: 1976
- Renovated: 2003

Tenants
- El Marg SC; Berkat El Haj SC

El Marg Stadium is a multi-purpose stadium. It is currently used mostly for football matches but there are several courts for basketball, volleyball and futsal.

El Marg SC formerly played their home games at El Marg Stadium.

There are also courts for karate, kungfu, taekwondo, weightlifting, table tennis.

- Capacity : 2,000
- Address : Al-Markaz Al-Egtema'y Street, El-Marg.
- Site : Cairo, Egypt.
