= Bab El Shaariya station =

Metro station in Cairo, Egypt

Bab El Shaariya محطة باب الشعرية

General information
- Location: Egypt
- Coordinates: 30°03′14.4″N 31°15′21.5″E
- System: Cairo Metro Rapid transit
- Operator: Cairo Metro - The Egyptian Co. for Metro Management & Operation
- Line: Line 3
- Platforms: 2 side platforms (Adly Mansour/Cairo International Airport - Rod El-Farag Corridor/Cairo University)
- Tracks: 2

Construction
- Structure type: Underground
- Depth: 20 metres (66 ft)
- Platform levels: 3
- Accessible: Yes

History
- Opened: 21 February 2012
- Electrified: Third rail

Services
Preceding station	Cairo Metro	Following station
Attaba towards Rod El Farag Corridor or Cairo University	Line 3	El-Geish towards Aldy Mansour
Location

Bab El Shaariya (Arabic: محطة باب الشعرية) is a station on Cairo Metro, part of Phase 1 of Line 3. it is located under El-Geish street in Bab El Shaaria Square at the intersection of Port Said street with that street.

== History ==
Bab El Shaariya station was inaugurated on 21 February 2012 as part of Phase 1 of Line 3.

== Overview ==
The station consists of three floors, with four entrances and elevators to transport passengers from the street level to the station platform and the length of the station is 150 meters and width of 22.90 meters and a depth of 20 meters from the station ground.

Like other stations on the network, the station has a contactless fare collection system, as well as an integrated supervision and communication system supplied by the Thales Group.

It’s the closest metro station to several historic and touristic landmarks in Islamic Cairo such as the Khan El Khalili Market and El Muizz Street

== Station layout ==
G	Street Level	Entrances/Exits (Elevator)
B1	Underground Level 1	to entrances/exits, fare control
B2	Underground Level 2	Engine Rooms/Maintenance
P Platform level	Side platform, doors will open on the left
P Platform level	Eastbound	→ Cairo Metro Line 3 toward Adly Mansour (El-Geish) →
P Platform level	Westbound	← Cairo Metro Line 3 toward Rod El Farag Corridor/Cairo University (Attaba)
P Platform level	Side platform, doors will open on the left

== See also ==
- Cairo Metro
- Cairo Metro Line 3
- List of Cairo Metro stations
