= Abbassiya station =

Metro station in Cairo, Egypt

Abbassiya محطة العباسية

General information
- Location: Egypt
- Coordinates: 30°04′10.8″N 31°16′51.3″E
- System: Cairo Metro Rapid transit
- Operator: Cairo Metro - The Egyptian Co. for Metro Management & Operation
- Line: Line 3
- Platforms: 1 side platform and 1 island platform (Adly Mansour/Cairo International Airport - Rod El Farag Corridor/Cairo University)
- Tracks: 3

Construction
- Structure type: Underground
- Depth: 19.5 metres (64 ft)
- Platform levels: 3
- Accessible: Yes

History
- Opened: 21 February 2012
- Electrified: Third rail

Services
Preceding station	Cairo Metro	Following station
Abdou Pasha towards Rod El Farag Corridor or Cairo University	Line 3	Fair Zone towards Aldy Mansour
Location

Abbassiya station (Arabic: محطة العباسية) is a station on Cairo Metro, part of phase 1 of the Line 3. It is located in Abbassia square, one of the largest and important places of Greater Cairo.

== History ==
Abbassia station was inaugurated on 21 February 2012 as part of phase 1 of Line 3. It serves several nearby governmental authorities and hospitals.

The station was considered the eastern terminus of the line until the inauguration of Phase 2 on 7 May 2014, and Al Ahram station became the eastern terminus of Line 3.

== Overview ==
The station consists of three floors, with four entrances and elevators to transport passengers from the street level to the station platform. It has a length of 275 metres (902 ft), a width of 31.5 metres (103 ft) and a depth of 19.5 metres (64 ft) from the station ground.

Like other stations of the network, the station have a contactless fare collection system as well as an integrated supervision and communication system supplied by the Thales Group.

== Station layout ==
G	Street Level	Entrances/Exits (Elevator)
B1	Underground Level 1	to entrances/exits, fare control
B2	Underground Level 2	Engine Rooms/Maintenance
P Platform level	Side platform, doors will open on the left
P Platform level	Eastbound	→ Cairo Metro Line 3 towards Adly Mansour (Fair Zone) →
P Platform level	Westbound	← Cairo Metro Line 3 towards Rod El Farag Corridor/Cairo University (Abdou Pasha)
P Platform level	Island platform, doors will open on the left
P Platform level	Island platform, not in service
P Platform level	Maintenance	→ toward workshop for minor overhaul →

== Notable places nearby ==
- Misr Travel HQ
- North Cairo Primary Court
- Al-Noor Mosque
- Saint Mark's Coptic Orthodox Cathedral
- El-Waily Traffic Department
- HQ, Central Military Region
- Ministry of Electricity and Renewable Energy (MOEE)
- Rural Electrification Authority (REA)
- Civil Status Organization (CSO)
- Ain Shams University as well as other schools
- Old Police Academy
- Abbassia Bus Station
- Abbassia Chest Hospital
- Abbassia Fever Hospital
- Abbassia Psychiatric Hospital

== Artwork ==
The station's main artwork is the Tutankhamen's crown, which was modified to take the form of ancient Egyptian architecture.

The artwork was inspired by the Ain Shams University, which is the most famous landmark in Abbassia. Ayn Shams means "well" or "eye of the sun", which references the ancient Ptolemaic Heliopolis which in turn was named for the importance of the cult of Ra in the ancient Egyptian capital Iunu, hence the usage of Tutankhamen's crown to symbolize that era.

== Accidents ==
External videos
- Metro train crash at Abbassia station بالفيديو.. انفراد.. أول لقطات لآثار حادث تصادم قطار مترو العباسية [Exclusive, first footage of Abbassia metro train crash]. Youm7. 2015.

On 26 April 2015, a train crashed into a buffer stop while coming out of maintenance on a branch line and going back to the main rail, the driver sustained injuries with no injuries among the passengers.

== See also ==
- Cairo Metro
- Cairo Metro Line 3
- List of Cairo Metro stations
