= Abdou Pasha station =

Metro station in Cairo, Egypt

Abdou Pasha محطة عبده باشا

General information
- Location: Egypt
- Coordinates: 30°03′53.4″N 31°16′29.2″E
- System: Cairo Metro Rapid transit
- Operator: Cairo Metro - The Egyptian Co. for Metro Management & Operation
- Line: Line 3
- Platforms: 2 side platforms (Adly Mansour/Cairo International Airport - Rod El-Farag Corridor/Cairo University)
- Tracks: 2

Construction
- Structure type: Underground
- Depth: 22.5 metres (74 ft)
- Platform levels: 3

History
- Opened: 21 February 2012
- Electrified: Third rail

Services
| Preceding station | Cairo Metro | Following station |
|---|---|---|
| El-Geish towards Rod El Farag Corridor or Cairo University | Line 3 | Abbassiya towards Aldy Mansour |
Location

Abdou Pasha station (Arabic: محطة عبده باشا) is a station on the Cairo Metro, part of Phase 1 of Line 3. It is located under El-Abaseya street in Abdou Pasha Square.

== History ==
Abdou Pasha station was inaugurated on 21 February 2012 as part of phase 1 of Line 3.

== Overview ==
The station consists of three floors, with four entrances and elevators to transport passengers from the street level to the station platform and the length of the station is 150 metres (490 ft) and width of 17.5 metres (57 ft) and a depth of 22.5 metres (74 ft) from the station ground.

Like other stations on the network, the station have a contactless fare collection system, as well as an integrated supervision and communication system supplied by the Thales Group.

== Station layout ==
| G | Street Level | Entrances/Exits (Elevator) |
| B1 | Underground Level 1 | to entrances/exits, fare control |
| B2 | Underground Level 2 | Engine Rooms/Maintenance |
| P Platform level | Side platform, doors will open on the left |
| P Platform level | Eastbound | → Cairo Metro Line 3 toward Adly Mansour (Abbassiya) → |
| P Platform level | Westbound | ← Cairo Metro Line 3 toward Rod El Farag Corridor/Cairo University (El-Geish) |
| P Platform level | Side platform, doors will open on the left |

== Notable places nearby ==
- Faculty of Engineering Ain Shams University
- Industrial area behind the Faculty of Engineering
- Different schools

== See also ==
- Cairo Metro
- Cairo Metro Line 3
- List of Cairo Metro stations
