= El-Geish station =

Metro station in Cairo, Egypt

El Geish Station محطة الجيش

General information
- Location: Egypt
- Coordinates: 30°03′42.8″N 31°16′00.7″E
- System: Cairo Metro Rapid transit
- Operator: Cairo Metro - The Egyptian Co. for Metro Management & Operation
- Line: Line 3
- Platforms: 2 side platforms (Adly Mansour/Cairo International Airport - Rod El Farag Corridor/Cairo University)
- Tracks: 2

Construction
- Structure type: Underground
- Depth: 22.1 metres (73 ft)
- Platform levels: 3

History
- Opened: 21 February 2012
- Electrified: Third rail

Services
Preceding station	Cairo Metro	Following station
Bab El Shaaria towards Rod El Farag Corridor or Cairo University	Line 3	Abdou Pasha towards Aldy Mansour
Location

El Geish (Arabic: محطة الجيش) is a station on Cairo Metro, part of phase 1 of Line 3. it is located under El-Geish Street in El-Geish Square.

== History ==
El Geish Station was inaugurated on 21 February 2012 as part of phase 1 of Line 3.

== Overview ==
The station consists of three floors, with four entrances and elevators to transport passengers from the street level to the station platform and the length of the station is 150 metres (490 ft) and width of 19.5 metres (64 ft) and a depth of 22.1 metres (73 ft) from the station ground.

Like other stations on the network, the station has a contactless fare collection system, as well as an integrated supervision and communication system supplied by the Thales Group.

== Station layout ==
G	Street Level	Entrances/Exits (Elevator)
B1	Underground Level 1	to entrances/exits, fare control
B2	Underground Level 2	Engine Rooms/Maintenance
P Platform level	Side platform, doors will open on the left
P Platform level	Eastbound	→ Cairo Metro Line 3 toward Adly Mansour (Abdou Pasha) →
P Platform level	Westbound	← Cairo Metro Line 3 toward Rod El-Farag Corridor/Cairo University (Bab El Shaariya)
P Platform level	Side platform, doors will open on the left

== Notable places nearby ==
- Mosque of al-Zahir Baybars
- El Daher district

== See also ==
- Cairo Metro
- Cairo Metro Line 3
- List of Cairo Metro stations
