= Cairo International Stadium =

Football stadium in Cairo, Egypt

Coordinates: 30°4′9″N 31°18′44″E

- ستاد القاهرة الدولي
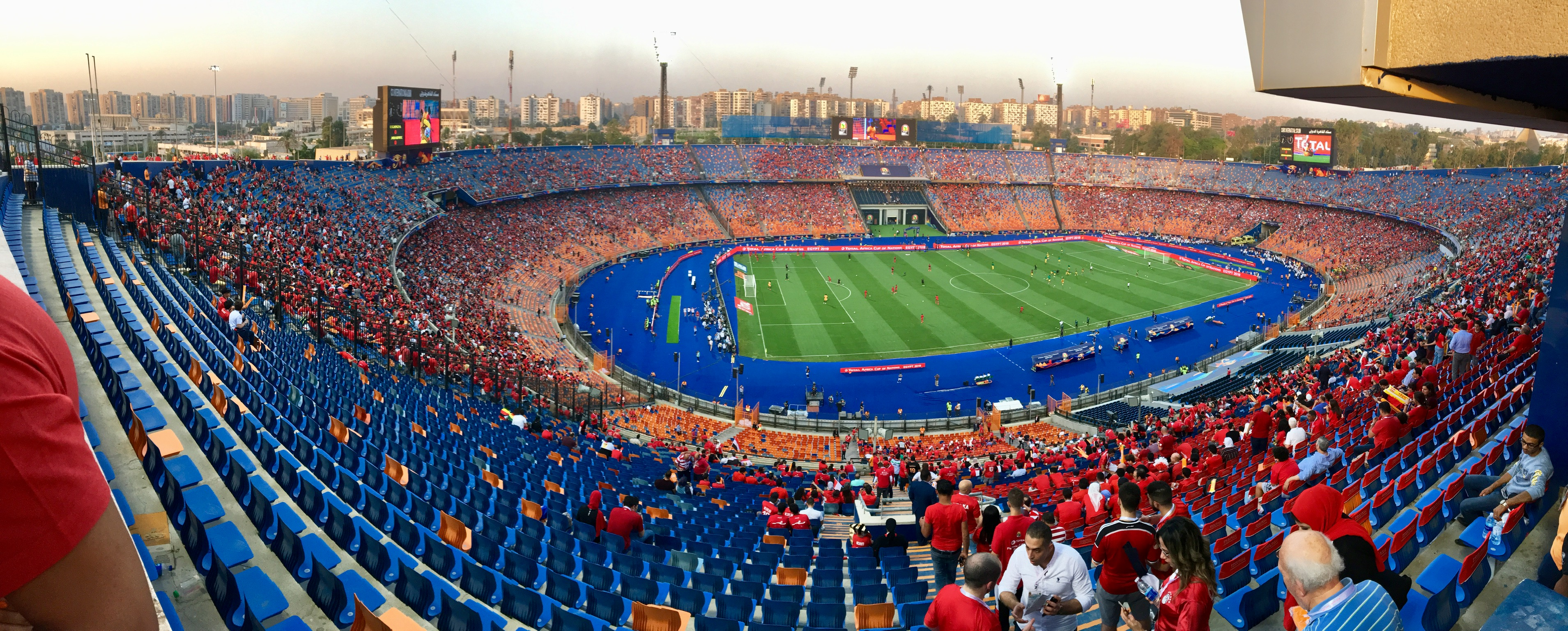
- Interactive map of Cairo International Stadium
- Full name: Cairo International Stadium
- Former names: Nasser Stadium
- Location: Nasr City, Cairo
- Capacity: 75,000
- Surface: FLexGrass hybrid grass
- Record attendance: 130,000 (1969)
- Public transit: Stadium station Fair zone station Stadium Monorail station

Construction
- Built: 1955–1960
- Opened: 23 July 1960
- Renovated: 2005, 2019
- Architect: Werner March
- Structural engineer: ACE Moharram Bakhoum

Tenants
- Egypt national football team (1960–present); Zamalek (1960–present); Al Ahly (1960–present)

The Cairo International Stadium (Egyptian Arabic: ستاد القاهرة الدولي), formerly known as Nasser Stadium, is an Olympic-standard, multi-use stadium with an all-seated capacity of 75,000. The architect of the stadium is the German Werner March, who designed the Olympic Stadium in Berlin from 1934 to 1936. The engineering and construction supervision of the stadium was performed by ACE Moharram Bakhoum. It is the 69th largest stadium in the world and the 3rd largest stadium in Egypt.

Located in Nasr City; a suburb north east of Cairo, it was completed in 1960, and was inaugurated by President Gamal Abd El Nasser on 23 July that year which coincided with the eighth anniversary of the Egyptian Revolution of 1952.

== Overview ==
The stadium is located about 10 km west of Cairo International Airport and about 10 km from downtown Cairo. In 2005, it was renovated in preparation for the 2006 African Cup of Nations.

Cairo Stadium is known for its atmosphere and capacity. This was evident during the 2006 African Cup of Nations, held in Egypt from 20 January to 10 February. Cairo Stadium is a symbol of Egyptian football. Nearly all of the most important Egyptian matches are held there. It has also served as the main stadium of the 1991 All-Africa Games.

== International football matches ==
=== 2006 Africa Cup of Nations ===
The stadium was one of the venues for the 2006 Africa Cup of Nations. The following games were played at the stadium during the 2006 Africa Cup of Nations:

Date	Time (EET)	Team #1	Result	Team #2	Round	Attendance
20 January 2006	19:00	Egypt	3–0	Libya	Group A	65,000
21 January 2006	14:00	Morocco	0–1	Ivory Coast	Group A	8,000
24 January 2006	17:15	Libya	1–2	Ivory Coast	Group A	42,000
24 January 2006	20:00	Egypt	0–0	Morocco	Group A	67,000
28 January 2006	19:00	Egypt	3–1	Ivory Coast	Group A	74,000
3 February 2006	19:00	Egypt	4–1	DR Congo	Quarter-finals	74,000
7 February 2006	19:00	Egypt	2–1	Senegal	Semi-finals	74,100
10 February 2006	19:00	Egypt	0–0 (4-2 pen.)	Ivory Coast	Final	74,100

=== 2009 FIFA U-20 World Cup ===
Several matches of the 2009 FIFA U-20 World Cup were played at the stadium, including the two semifinals, the third-place match, and the final between Brazil and Ghana. Ghana became the first African country to win the youth tournament.

=== 2019 Africa Cup of Nations ===
The stadium was one of the venues for the 2019 Africa Cup of Nations.

The following games were played at the stadium during the 2019 Africa Cup of Nations:

Date	Time (EET)	Team #1	Result	Team #2	Round	Attendance
21 June 2019	22:00	Egypt	1–0	Zimbabwe	Group A	73,299
22 June 2019	16:30	DR Congo	0–2	Uganda	Group A	1,083
26 June 2019	19:00	Uganda	1–1	Zimbabwe	Group A	73,589
26 June 2019	22:00	Egypt	2–0	DR Congo	Group A	74,219
30 June 2019	21:00	Uganda	0–2	Egypt	Group A	74,566
5 July 2019	21:00	Uganda	0–1	Senegal	Round of 16	6,950
6 July 2019	21:00	Egypt	0–1	South Africa	Round of 16	75,000
10 July 2019	21:00	Nigeria	2–1	South Africa	Quarter-finals	48,343
14 July 2019	21:00	Algeria	2–1	Nigeria	Semi-finals	49,775
19 July 2019	21:00	Senegal	0–1	Algeria	Final	75,000

== Transport connections ==
The stadium is located in Nasr City; a suburb north east of Cairo and can be reached by underground via the dedicated Cairo stadium subway station at line 3

Stations nearby:

Service	Station	Line
Cairo Metro	Cairo Stadium	→ Cairo Metro Line 3
Cairo Metro	Fair Zone	→ Cairo Metro Line 3

== Gallery ==
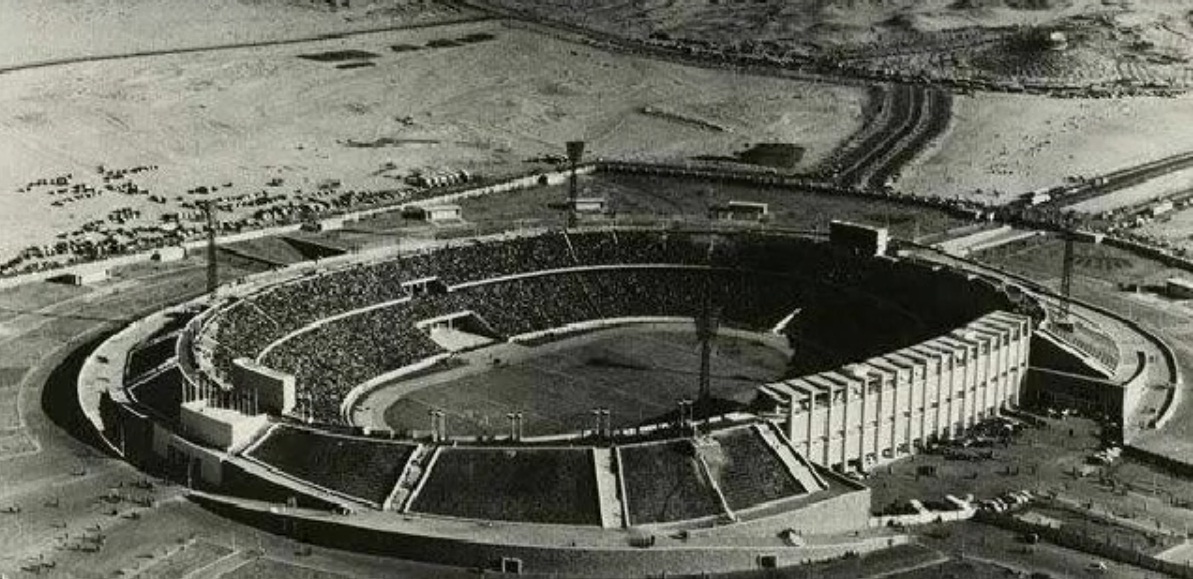
Aerial view of Cairo Stadium in 1960.

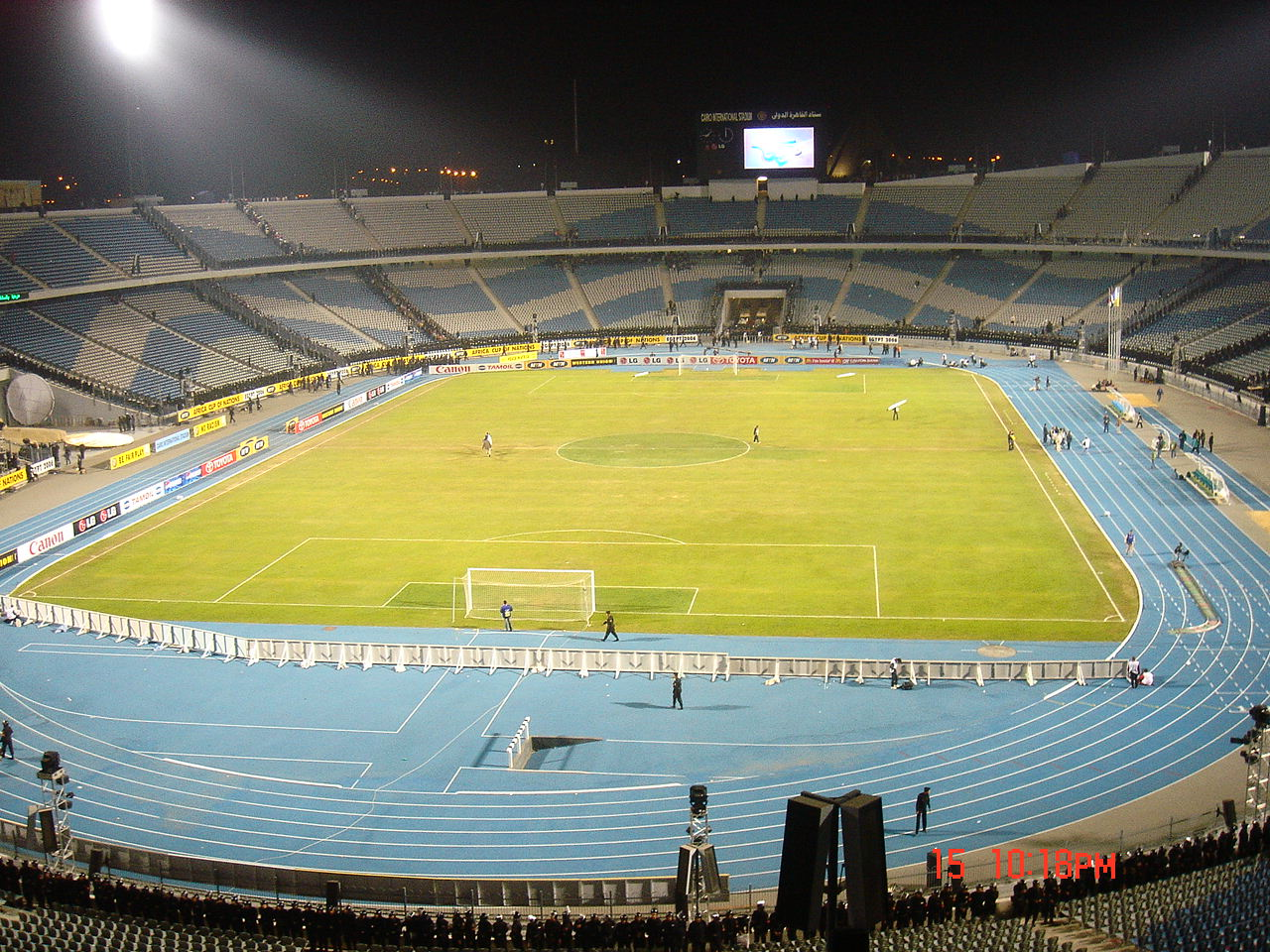
A view of the stadium in 2006.

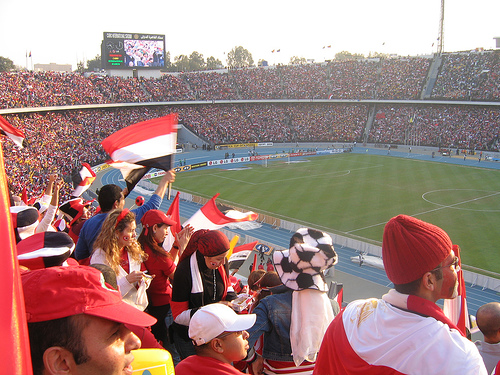
Egyptian supporters attending a match involving the national team in African Cup 2006.

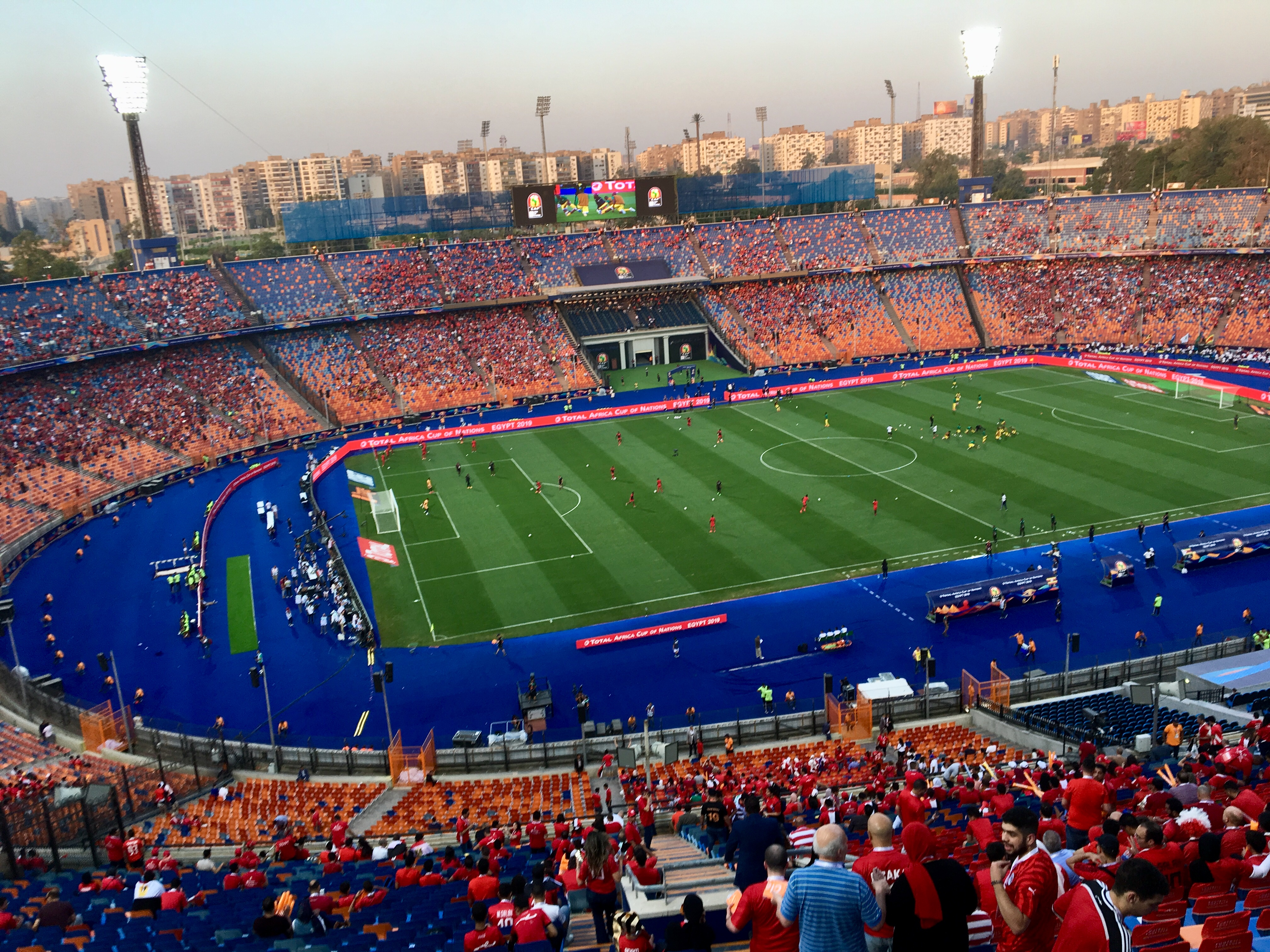
A view of the stadium minutes before the match between Uganda and Zimbabwe during AFCON 2019

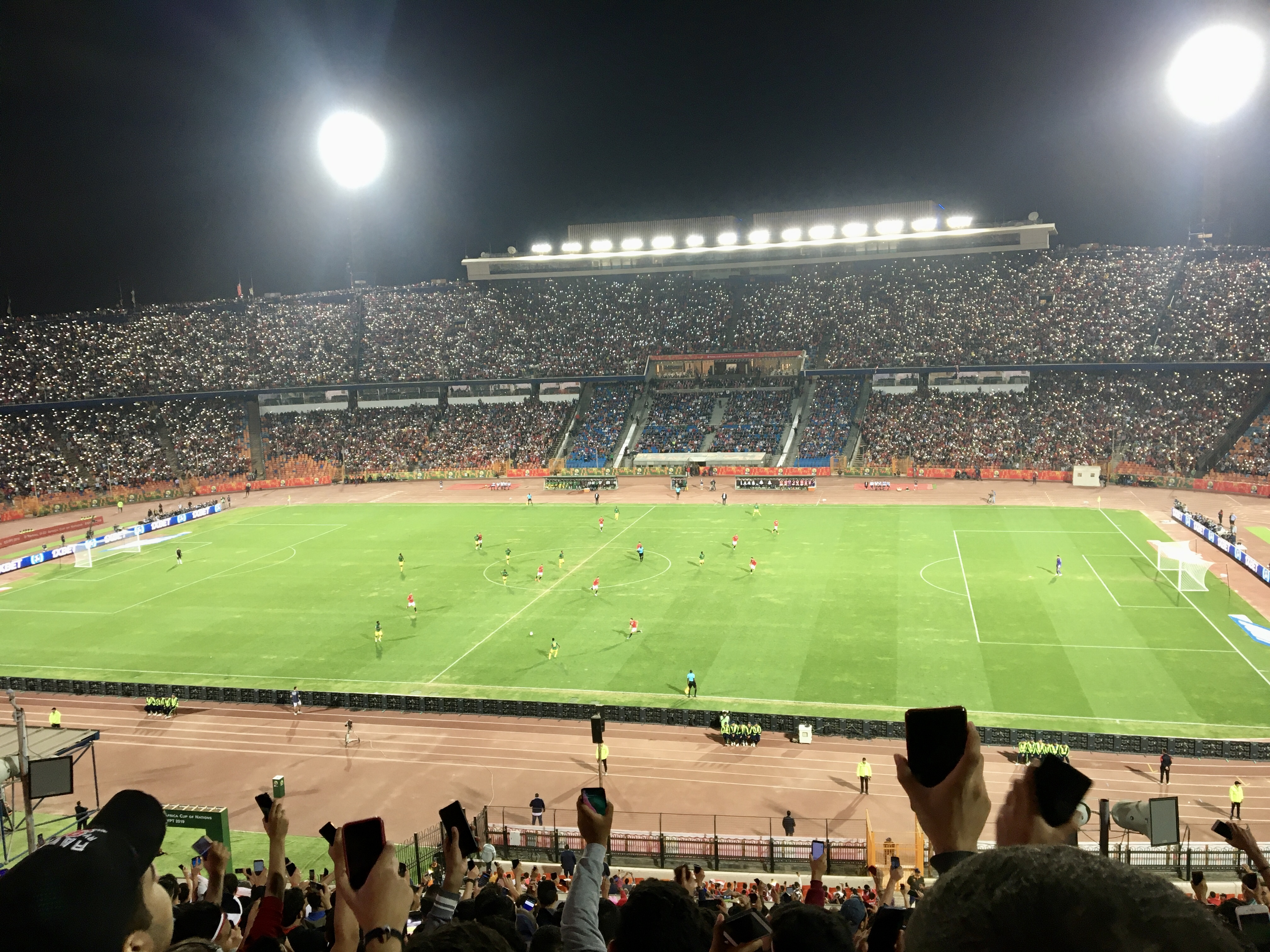
Cairo stadium during Egypt u23 vs South Africa u23 match

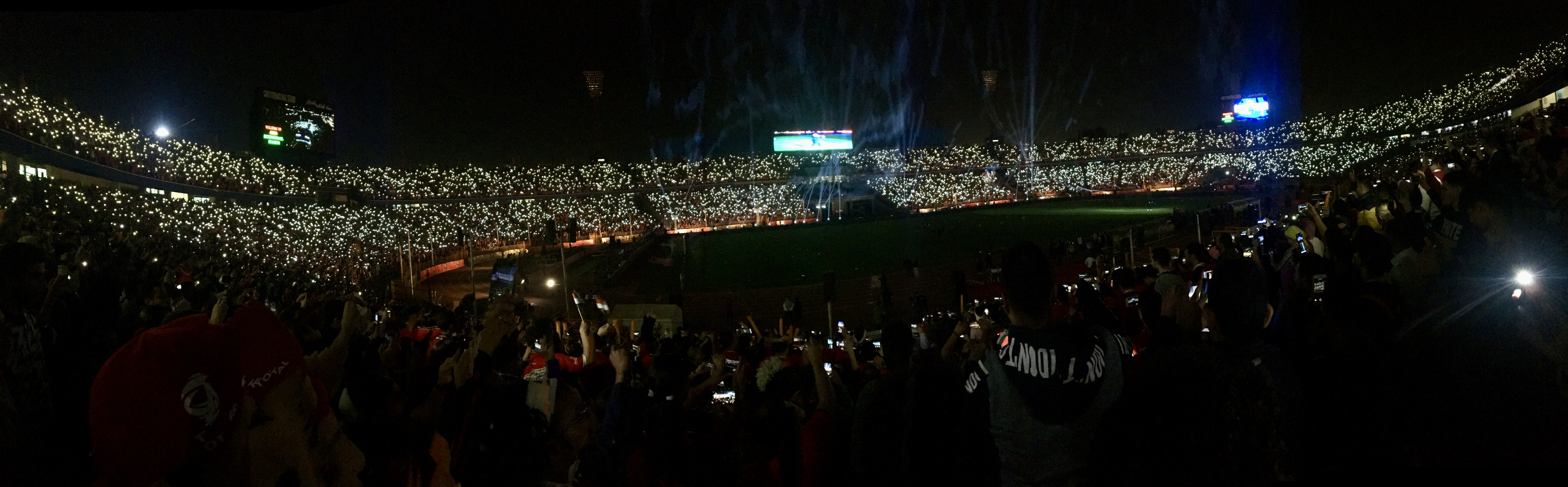
Cairo stadium during AFCON U23 Closing ceremony

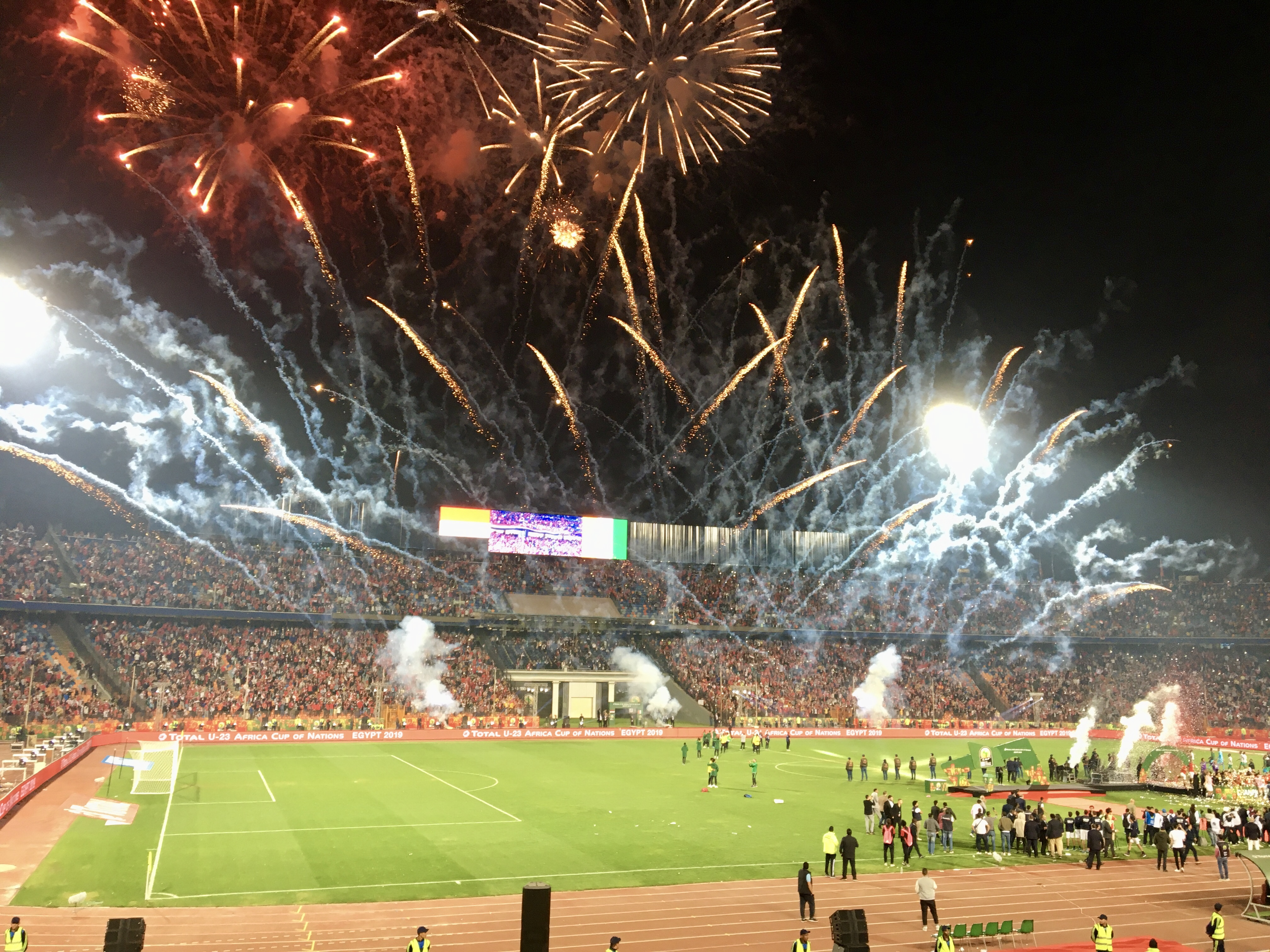
Cairo stadium during AFCON U23 Closing ceremony

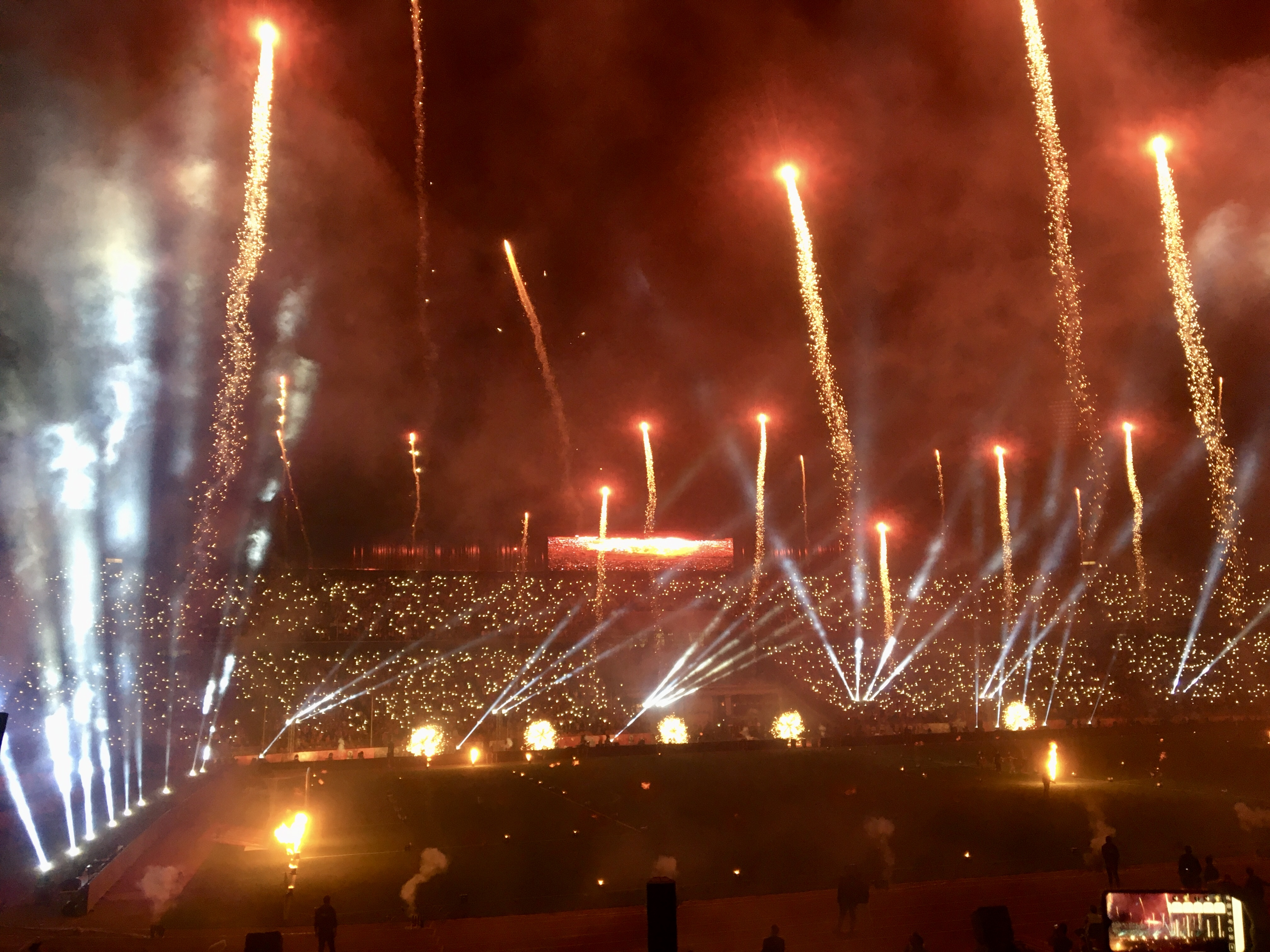
Cairo stadium during AFCON U23 Closing ceremony

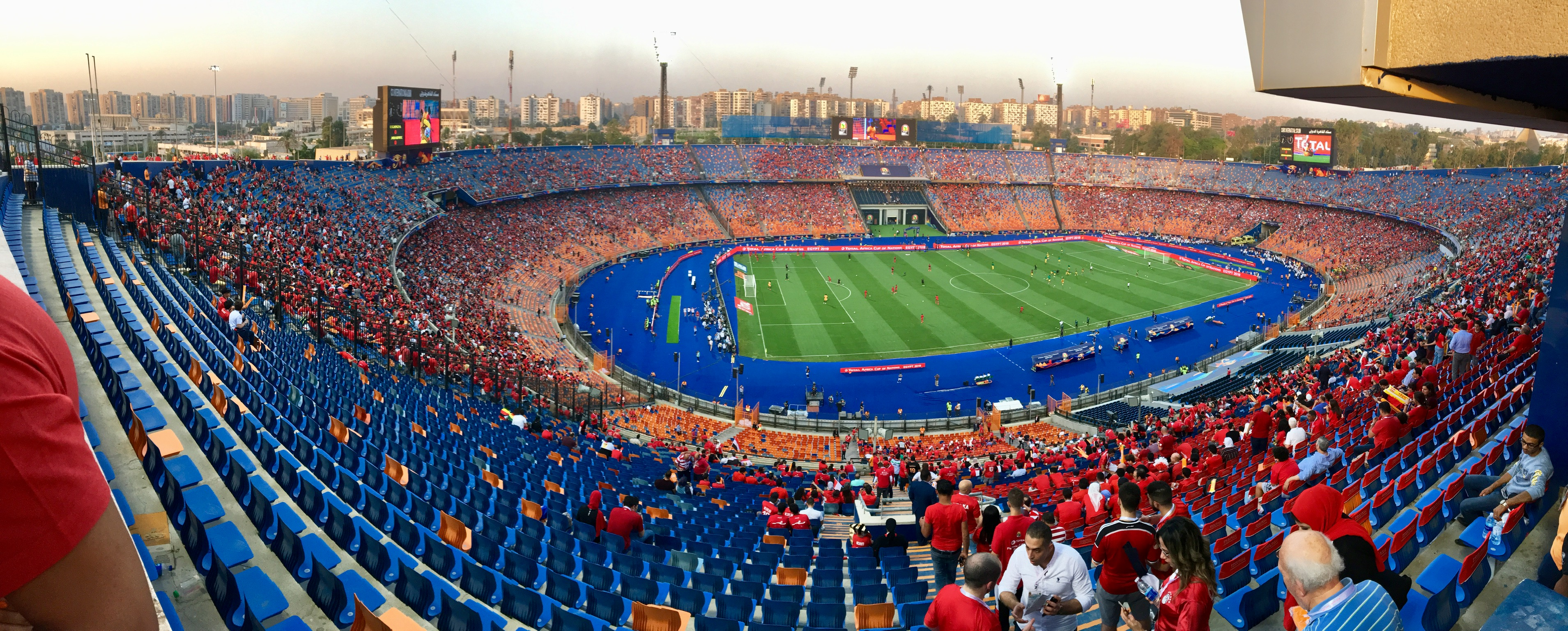
A Panorama view of the stadium interior

== See also ==
- Cairo Stadium Indoor Halls Complex
- List of football stadiums in Egypt
- Lists of stadiums

Preceded by Stade 7 November; Rades	Africa Cup of Nations; Final venue 2006	Succeeded by Ohene Djan Stadium; Accra
Preceded by National Soccer Stadium; Toronto	FIFA U-20 World Cup; Final venue 2009	Succeeded by Estadio Nemesio Camacho; Bogotá
Preceded by Stade de l'Amitié; Libreville	Africa Cup of Nations; Final venue 2019	Succeeded by Paul Biya Stadium; Yaoundé
