= Fair Zone station =

Metro station in Cairo, Egypt

Fair Zone محطة المعرض

General information
- Location: Egypt
- Coordinates: 30.07333°N 31.30091°E
- System: Cairo Metro Rapid transit
- Operator: Cairo Metro - The Egyptian Co. for Metro Management & Operation
- Line: Line 3
- Platforms: 2 side platforms (Rod El Farag Corridor or Cairo University - Aldy Mansour)
- Tracks: 2

Construction
- Structure type: Underground
- Platform levels: 3

History
- Opened: 7 May 2014
- Electrified: Third rail

Services
Preceding station	Cairo Metro	Following station
Abbassiya towards Rod El Farag Corridor or Cairo University	Line 3	Stadium towards Aldy Mansour
Location

Fair Zone station (Arabic: محطة المعرض) is a station on the Cairo Metro, part of Phase 2 of Line 3. It is located on Salah Salem Street in front of the Cairo International Fair Ground, one of the most important commercial and administrative centers of Cairo.

== Overview ==
Fair Zone station was inaugurated on 7 May 2014 as part of phase 2 of Line 3.

In addition, the station has a contactless fare collection system as well as an integrated supervision and communication system supplied by the Thales Group.

== Station layout ==
G	Street Level	Entrances/Exits (Elevator)
B1	Underground Level 1	to entrances/exits, fare control
B2	Underground Level 2	Engine Rooms/Maintenance
P Platform level	Side platform, doors will open on the left
P Platform level	Eastbound	→ Cairo Metro Line 3 toward Adly Mansour (Stadium) →
P Platform level	Westbound	← Cairo Metro Line 3 toward Rod El Farag Corridor or Cairo University (Abbassiya)
P Platform level	Side platform, doors will open on the left

== Notable places nearby ==
- Cairo International Book Fair
- State Information Service
- General Authority for Investment

== See also ==
- Cairo Metro
- Cairo Metro Line 3
- List of Cairo metro stations
