= Cairo Monorail =

Monorail System in Cairo, Egypt

Overview
- Native name: مونوريل القاهرة
- Owner: National Authority for Tunnels
- Area served: Greater Cairo
- Locale: Cairo, Egypt
- Transit type: Monorail
- Number of lines: 1 line operational 1 line under construction.
- Number of stations: 33

Operation
- Began operation: 6 May 2026
- Number of vehicles: 70 Alstom Innovia 300 Monorail vehicles

Technical
- System length: 96 km (60 mi) planned
- Average speed: 80 km/h (50 mph)

The Cairo Monorail (Egyptian Arabic: مونوريل القاهرة) is a partly operational two-line monorail rapid transit system in the Greater Cairo metropolitan area and is projected to become the longest driverless monorail system in the world when completed. The two lines will create the first public transport from The New Capital and 6th of October to Cairo when completed. Travel time for the 53km East Nile Line between the New Administrative Capital and eastern Cairo is about 60 minutes, while the 42km West Nile line connecting 6th of October with Giza is expected to be about 42 minutes.

The East Nile Line was inaugurated on March 20, 2026, while passenger service began on May 6, 2026.

== Background ==
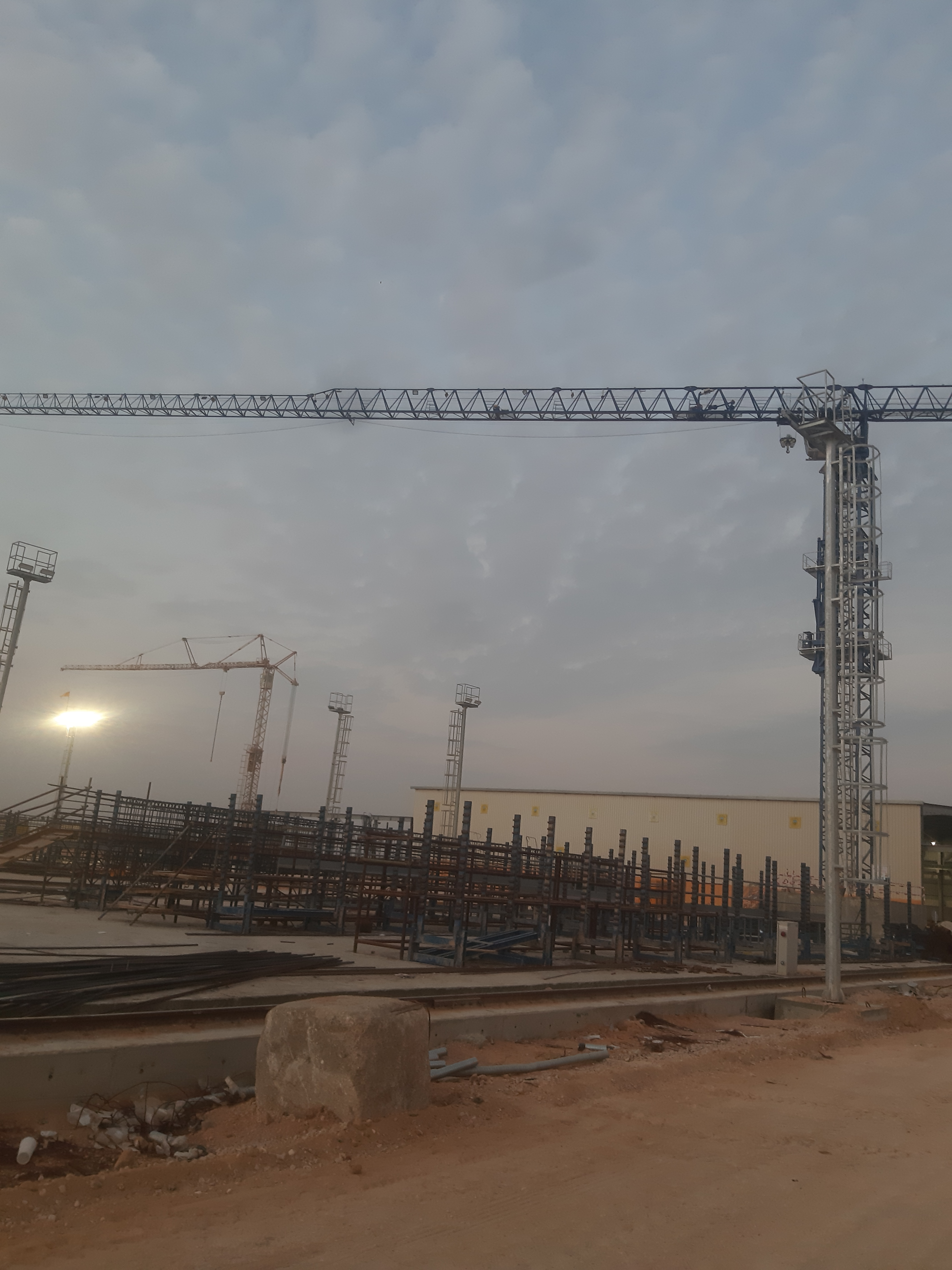
Construction in November 2021

The Cairo Monorail was first conceptualized in the late 2010s to combat the rise of traffic in the Greater Cairo area, and to provide a rapid transportation option for suburban residents. The Monorail was also thought of as a rail link between Cairo and Egypt's The New Capital. The Monorail has also been chosen to use renewable resources, to cause less pollution and to be a zero emissions form of transit. The monorail is also automated, meaning it does not require a driver for operations.

=== Funding ===
Funding for the project was secured and obtained through a mix of local and international investments. This included a substantial loan facilitation agreement between the National Authority for Tunnels and JPMorgan Chase, as well as contributions from other financial institutions such as the European Bank for Reconstruction and Development and the European Investment Bank. The total funding amounted to approximately 4.5 billion euros.

=== Design and operation ===
In August 2019, it was announced Alstom, would lead a consortium that included Arab Contractors and Orascom. The consortium signed a 2.7 billion euro contract to design, construct, operate, and maintain the two monorail lines. Upon completion of the construction phase, the consortium will provide 30 years of operation and maintenance services for both lines.

=== Opening ===
The East Nile line was expected to first open to the public in 2023, however was delayed to October 2024, before being further delayed to mid-2025. The initial trial operations ran from the control center at the New Administrative Capital to the Moshir Mosque Station.

The East Nile Line was inaugurated on March 20, 2026, while passenger service began on May 6, 2026.

== Routes ==
The two lines connect to Cairo Metro Line 3, but are not directly connected to each other.

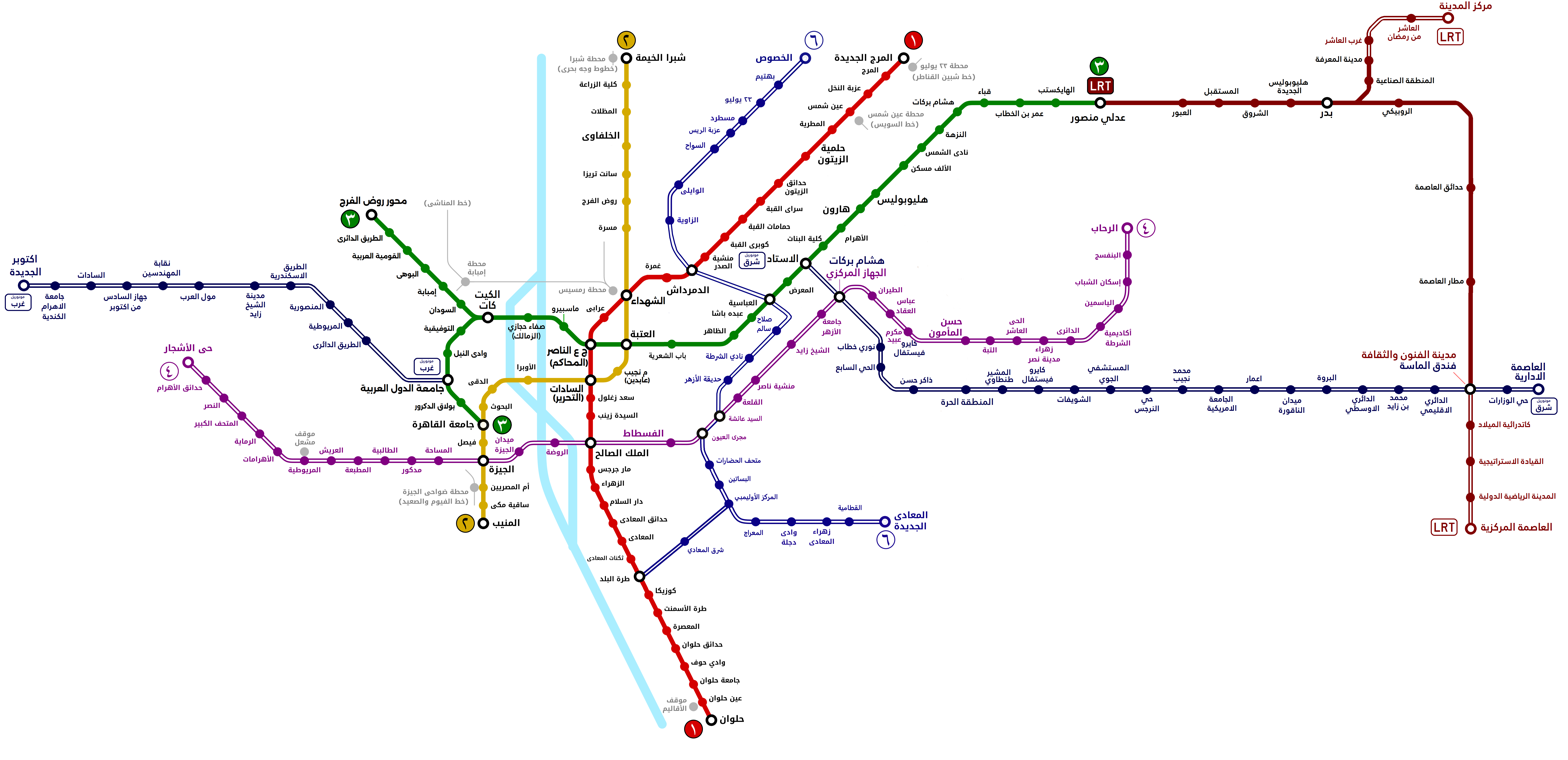
Cairo Metro, LRT, and monorail expansion plans (In Arabic)

=== East Nile line ===
Construction on this line began in 2019 and was initially scheduled for completion in May 2022. However, the completion date was postponed to October 2023, with operations expected to start in April 2024. By January 2026, trial operation was underway, with passenger operations starting on March 20, 2026. The line was open to the public on May 6, 2026.

The line is 56.5 kilometres (35.1 mi) long, with 22 stations starting with Stadium and terminating at Justice City.

The line provides as a transfer to the Cairo Metro Line 3 at its terminus in Stadium station. It is also connected to the Cairo LRT at the Arts and Culture City station of the LRT.

==== Stations ====
| Station Number | Name | Area | Connections | Landmarks |
|---|---|---|---|---|
| 1 | Cairo Stadium (إستاد القاهره) | Nasr City | Cairo Metro Line 3 | Cairo International Stadium |
| 2 | Hesham Barakat (هشام بركات) | Nasr City | | |
| 3 | Al Azhar University (جامعة الازهر) | Nasr City | | Al Azhar University |
| 4 | 7th District (الحي السابع) | Nasr City | | |
| 5 | Marshal Ahmed Ismail (المشير احمد اسماعيل) | Nasr City | | |
| 6 | Jehan Sadat (جيهان السادات) | Nasr City | | |
| 7 | Marshal Tantawi (المشير طنطاوي) | Nasr City | | El-Mosheer Tantawy Mosque |
| 8 | One Ninety (وان نانتي) | New Cairo | | Ring Road - New Cairo |
| 9 | Air Force Hospital (المستشفي الجوي) | New Cairo | | Air Force Specialized Hospital |
| 10 | El-Nargus (النرجس) | New Cairo | | El-Nargus area, New Cairo |
| 11 | Investors (المستثمرين) | New Cairo | | Investors Area, New Cairo |
| 12 | Al-Lotus (اللوتس) | New Cairo | | Al-Lotus Area, New Cairo |
| 13 | Golden Square (جولدن سكوير) | New Cairo | | |
| 14 | Biet El-Watan (بيت وطن) | New Cairo | | |
| 15 | Al-Fattah al-Aleem Mosque (مسجد الفتاح العليم) | New Capital | | Al-Fattah al-Aleem Mosque |
| 16 | R1 (حي R1) | New Capital | | Green River |
| 17 | R2 (حي R2) | New Capital | | Central Park |
| 18 | Central Business District (CBD) منطقة الأعمال) (المركزية | New Capital | | Iconic Tower |
| 19 | Arts & Culture City (مدينة الفنون والثقافة) | New Capital | Cairo LRT | Arts & Culture City, New Capital Opera House |
| 20 | Government District (الحي الحكومي) | New Capital | | |
| 21 | Misr Mosque (مسجد مصر) | New Capital | | Misr Mosque |
| 22 | Justice City (مدينة العدالة) | New Capital | | Administrative Control Authority |

=== West Nile line ===
Work on the October Line started in January 2020, and was projected to begin operating in mid 2023. However work on it has been delayed due to difficulties in expropriating land for the project, pushing the operational date to October 2024. It's currently further delayed, with no estimated operation date.

The line will be 45 kilometres (28 mi) long, with 13 stations starting with New October Station, Industrial Zone Station, Sadat Station, Sixth of October City Authority Station, Engineers Association Station, Nile University Station, Hyper One station, Cairo-Alexandria Desert Road, Mansouriya Station, Mariouteya Station, Ring Road Station, Bashteel railway station, and terminating at Nile Valley Station.

The line will provide a transfer to the Cairo Metro Line 3 at Wadi El Nile Station, part of the line's eastern expansion plans.

== Rolling stock ==
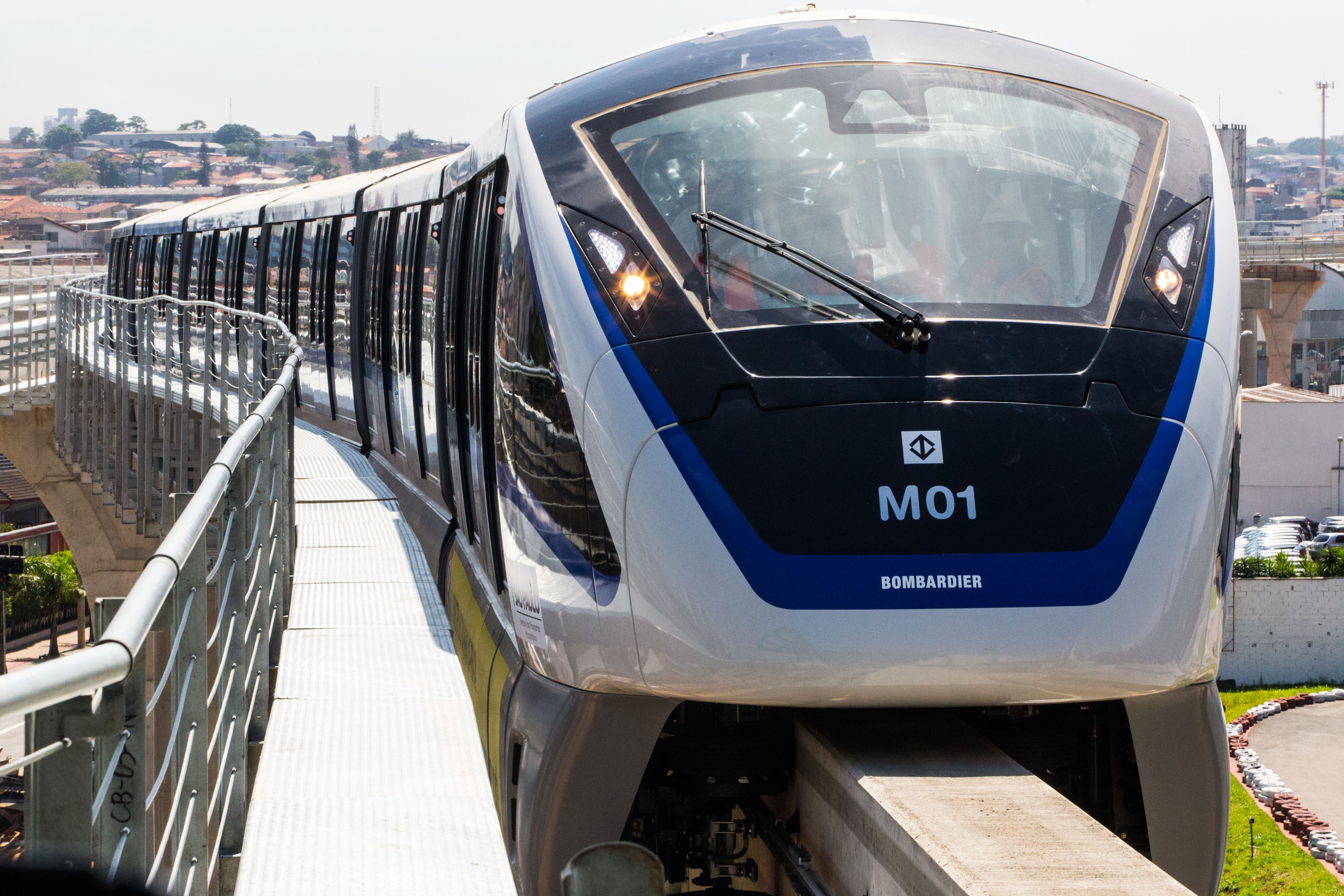
Alstom Innovia Monorail 300, as seen in the São Paulo Metro

Cairo Monorail is set to use 70 fully automated Alstom Innovia Monorail 300 vehicles for both lines. The vehicles are four cars long and were manufactured at Alstom's Derby Litchurch Lane Works factory in Derby, England.

The Innovia 300 Monorail system incorporates Alstom's Cityflo 650 CBTC system, which uses radio communication and moving block technology to manage train operations.

== See also ==
- Cairo Metro
- Cairo Bus Rapid Transit
- Cairo Light Rail Transit
- Urban rail transit in Africa
- List of monorail systems
