= Urban rail transit in Africa =

Overview of Africa's urban rail transit system

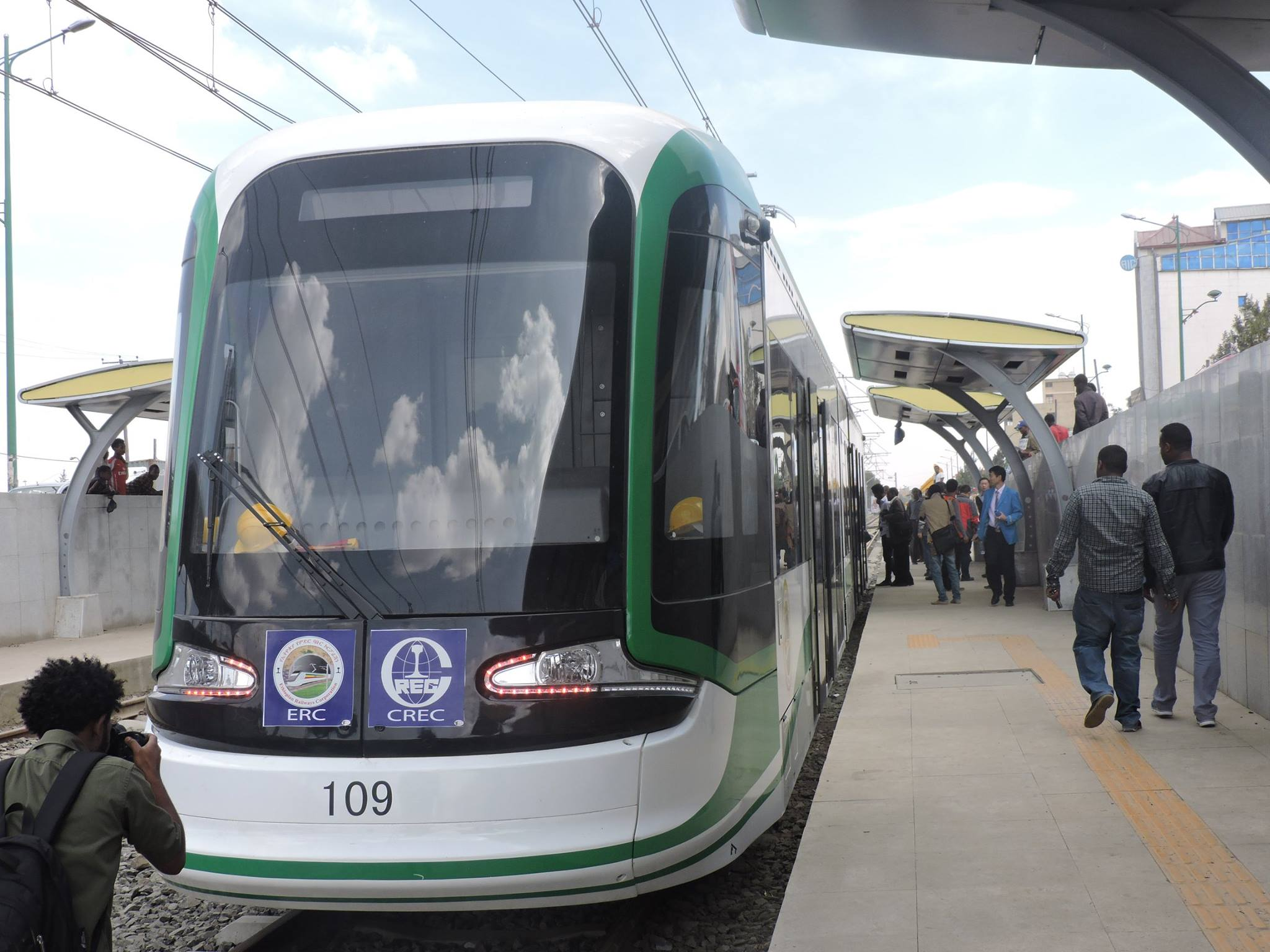
Africa's newest Urban rail transit project, Addis Ababa

Urban rail transit has emerged as a growing form of transit due to rapid urbanization that has occurred in recent decades across the continent of Africa. Some of these transit systems are older and more developed, such as the metro in Cairo which opened in 1987. Others such as the light-rail system in Addis Ababa are much more recent, which opened in 2015. A variety of technologies are being used ranging from light-rail, bus rapid-transit, and commuter-rail etc. Africa for several decades saw minimal investment in rail infrastructure, but in recent years due to urban population growth and improved financing options, investment in rail networks has increased.

== Background ==
African heavy-rail is an artifact of the colonial period, where colonizing nations built out these networks to further the conquest of Africa. The colonial powers also used these networks to transport resources they extracted from operations they developed. These rail networks criss-crossed major areas of Africa, but with the independence period these networks became splintered due to new borders across the continent. These networks declined over the next few decades, due to lower demand and lower levels of investment. Like many other aspects of African governments, these became overstaffed.

In recent decades, potential economic growth has been untapped with the growth of extractive industries such as mining and oil drilling. Many of these mines are located in the several land-locked nations in the African interior. Aware of the environmental toll that road-transport requires, nations and foreign actors are realizing the potential of rail transit in Africa. Besides economic incentives, urbanization has been fueling the growth of mega cities across the globe. Lagos, Nairobi, Cairo, Kinshasa, Luanda, Dar es Salaam, Johannesburg, and Abidjan, etc., either are all mega cities across Africa that are either already at 10 million people, or soon on track to surpass that number. In recent years there has been a growth in both urban rail systems, and more traditional heavy rail.

== Northern Africa ==
Map of Cairo Metro circa 2006, in Arabic

=== Egypt ===
Egypt is home to the Cairo Metro, the oldest rail transit system on the African continent, which opened in 1987. The National Authority for Tunnels was established in 1983, which oversees the Cairo Metro. It is composed of three lines, the first line opening in 1987. The most recent line, the 3rd line was completed in 2024. The construction of this 3rd line was possible with French and European Union funding, but there are currently plans for a 4th, 5th, and 6th line. The current rail network handles about 4 million people daily, and runs on almost 110 km of track. The Cairo Metro currently uses rolling stock from Hyundai Rotem, in which the Metro has placed orders in 2012, 2017, and 2019. It runs on a standard gauge track.

Cairo also has an LRT system, which opened in 2022, that serves the eastern suburbs of the city and the New Administrative Capital before ending at the interchange between the LRT and the high speed rail.

=== Algeria ===
Algeria has a metro system in Algiers, originally put forward in 1980. But it was postponed for a couple decades before finally opening in 2011. It is 18.8 km long, and runs on fourteen trains. Algeria has significant oil deposits which cause very low oil prices in the country, leading to high levels of car usage. Algiers is a large city in North Africa, and is not designed for the number of cars being put on its streets; the gridlock has spurred rapid metro expansion on a series of projects. Several projects are underway and slated to open in the early part of the 2020 decade.

=== Tunisia ===
The capital of Tunisia, Tunis is home to a developing light-rail system. It existed in the past also, but was removed with the advent of "car culture." The light-rail system returned in 1985. It is composed of five lines, and has undergone improvements in recent years. Thanks to a combination of foreign funding from the AFD, EIB, French Government, the Tunisian government has been able to undertake these improvements and extensions. Although Tunis is not a particularly large city, its bus system had become overloaded, and there was extensive traffic in the city center.

=== Morocco ===
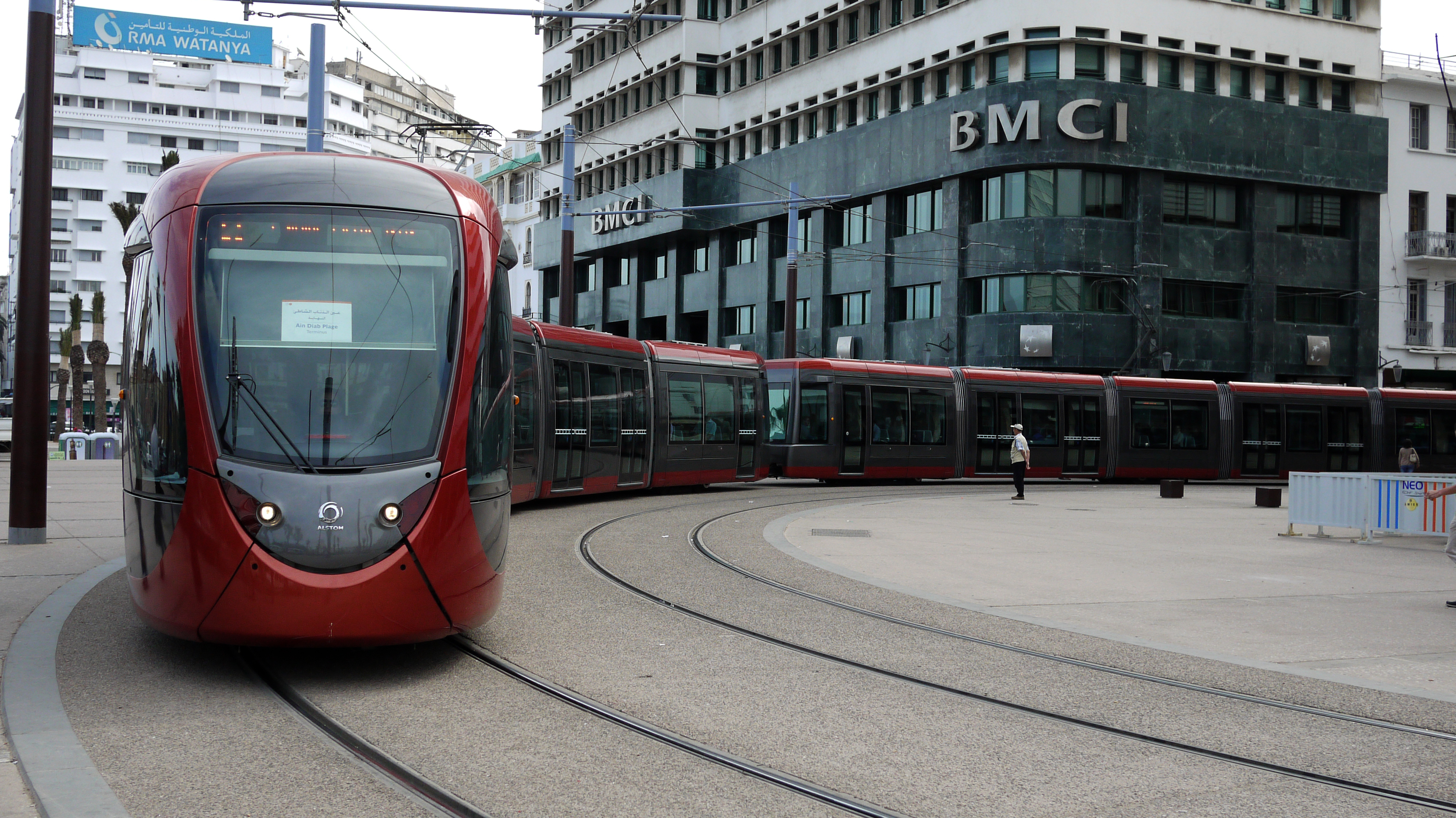
Casablanca Tramway with Alstom trams

Casablanca is more complex than Algiers or Tunis, in order to connect the suburban areas to the downtown of Casablanca, a system of four tramway lines with over 100 km of tracks, and 124 trains as well as two lines of BRT(bus rapid transit) is achieved, the city has future projects of monorail system but no progress so far.

== West Africa ==
=== Nigeria ===
==== Abuja ====
Abuja Rail Mass Transit, commonly known as Abuja Light Rail, is a regional rail transport system in the Federal Capital Territory of Nigeria. It is the first rapid transit system in the country and in West Africa and the second such system in sub-saharan Africa (after Addis Ababa Light Rail). The first phase of the project connects the city center to Nnamdi Azikiwe International Airport, stopping at the Abuja-Kaduna Railway station in Idu. The Abuja Metro Line was launched on 12 July 2018 and opened for passengers the following week.

==== Lagos ====
Nigeria's economic center, Lagos is one of the fastest growing metro areas across the globe. Unlike other metro areas Lagos until very recently did not have a form of mass transit. China in its ambitious Belt and Road initiative over the last decade, has been especially prominent in Nigeria. China's vehicle for this investment is through loans from the Export-Import Bank and China Civil Engineering Construction Company (CCECC). Lagos was projected to hit a population of 25 million making it one of the largest metro areas on Earth. In 2008 Bus-Rapid transit was launched, but this had limited capacity. The first line, The Lagos Blue Line, officially began operation on September 4,2023 and the next line, The Lagos Red Line is 95% complete. A much more ambitious project was launched in 2009 for "Lite-Rail", Nigeria is currently focused on developing two lines, estimated to carry 500,000 passengers daily. Light-Rail in Lagos is complicated with the presence of significant water due to the presence of a lagoon and the Atlantic Coast, but construction is being coordinated for seamless transition between different modes of transportation.

=== Senegal ===
Dakar, the economic centre of the country, has been facing several mobility problems for the past years. This situation led to the opening in 2019 of a new infrastructure to relieve congestion in the suburbs, but also to join the capital to the new Blaise Diagne International Airport by the end of 2023.

The work has started in 2016 and the line also passes by another relatively recent important centre of the country, Diamniadio. This project is part of the Plan Senegal Emergent put in place by the president Macky Sall, elected in 2012.

By 2024, work for extensions towards Thiès and Mbour is planned to start.

=== Côte d'Ivoire ===
The largest city and economic center Abidjan is set to welcome one of the first metro systems in West Africa, signing a deal in 2019 with a French company. Although construction will not start till 2020. There has been some delays with the project as it was initially announced in 2015, but now service is expected to begin in 2022. France has actually offered to finance the whole project at a cost of 1.4 billion Euros. Due to the physical nature of Abidjan which has many islands and peninsulas, the metro project requires significant construction of infrastructure. In total in order for this project to be completed it "will require the construction of 24 bridges, 1 viaduct over the lagoon, 34 pedestrian footbridges and 8 underpasses." It is set to be one line initially with 18 stations and a capacity of 500,000 riders per day. Similar to other French-backed projects Alstom was awarded the contract for the physical train-sets.

== Central Africa ==
=== Cameroon ===
The largest city in Cameroon, Douala is home to roughly 2.8 million people; like many other African cities it is undergoing rapid rates of growth and a horrible degree of traffic congestion. Some relief is coming to the residents of Douala, as the Biya government and a Belgian and Turkish company have agreed to build a tramway. The pilot project is set to open in 2021, but is planned to be part of a larger five line tram network. In order to speed the construction of the other eventual lines, the project will use the same track 1,000 mm gauge as conventional rail. This will create a mixed used network of train and tram to build on the existing rail infrastructure in Cameroon. Cameroon's capital city Yaoundé is also on track to have a tramway, built by the same Belgian and Turkish company currently building the Douala pilot network.

== East Africa ==
=== Tanzania ===
Dar es Salaam is the economic center of Tanzania. In 2012, it welcomed the Treni ya Mwakyembe commuter rail system, which can serve a total of 30,000 passengers per day. Considering Dar es Salaam is projected to hit 13.4 million by 2035, this commuter rail system is only a drop in the bucket. A one-way ticket costs $0.25, or $0.50 round trip. Instead of building out a metro project like many other African cities are undertaking Dar es Salaam is focused on creating a BRT system. Dar es Salaam similar to many other rapidly growing urban centers is faced with significant traffic issues. Due to the size of Dar es Salaam, some commuters spend up to two hours commuting each day by very informal dalla dalla minibuses. Transport in Dar es Salaam is further constrained, because the highway network was designed to only handle 35,000 people created during the colonial era.

=== Ethiopia ===
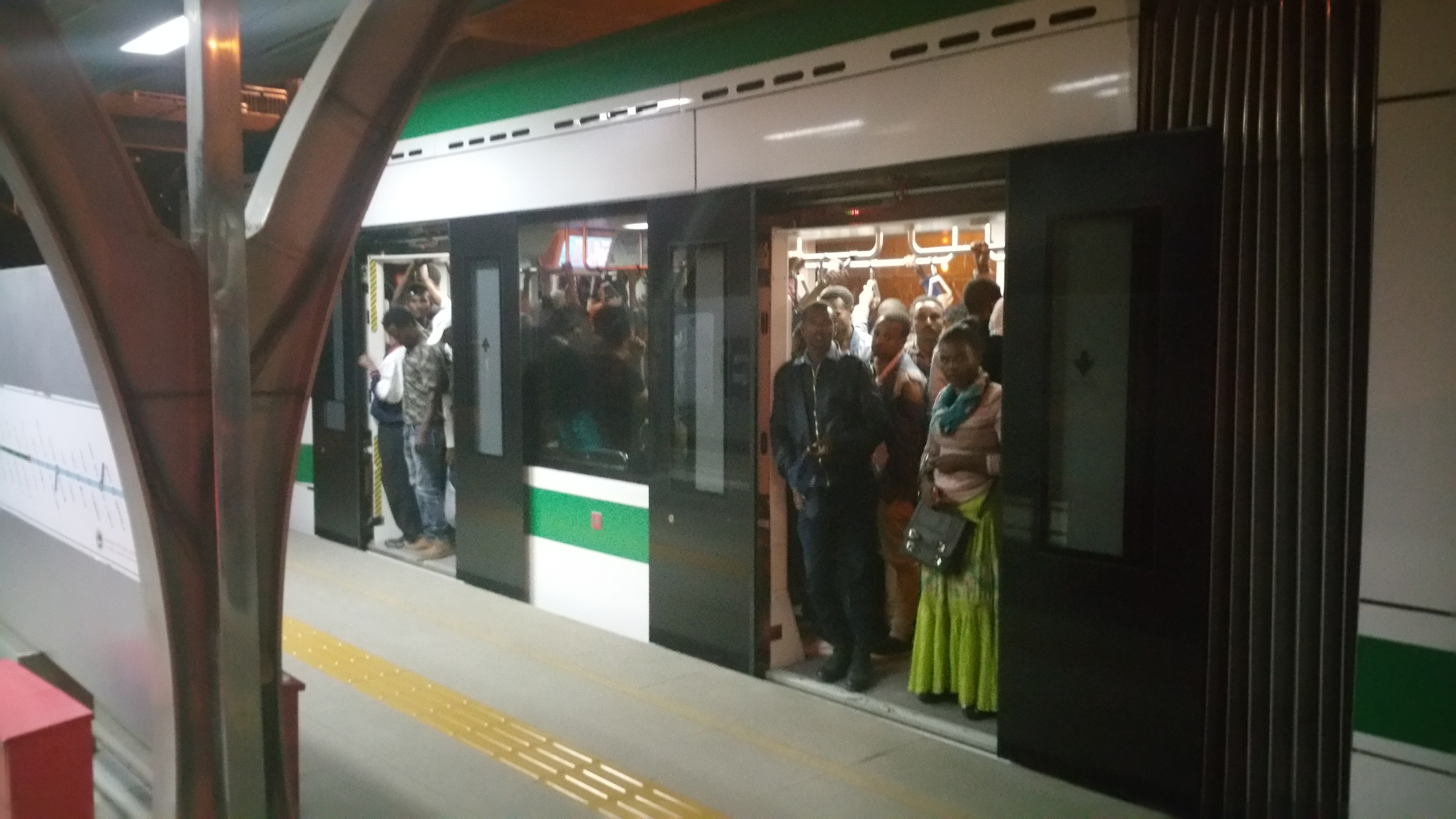
A large part of Addis-Ababa ridership is the working commuter.

The Ethiopian government originally proposed this project in 2006, so this project was rather quickly implemented, opening in 2015. Although opened in 2015 it received little attention until 2017. Addis Ababa, like so many other African cities is undergoing major growth and urbanization. Current international donors and agencies are interested in developing sustainably, so there has been an overwhelming focus on African cities. These projects included Addis Ababa, with the stated goals to reduce car emissions, decrease traffic gridlock, and improve transport equity. China, along with France have both been focused in recent years on developing urban rail lines, China actually was very involved in this project. China through its Chinese Export-Import Bank, provided 85% of the funding for this project, like similar contracts China operates and built the entire system in Ethiopia. Addis Ababa Light-Rail has two lines currently, with a daily ridership of around 150,000 people. The tram has helped reduce the issue of urban sprawl, as Addis Ababa has grown further and further out. Due to this urban sprawl commute times have steadily increased, but the Light-Rail system has allowed for easier commuting for those with the longest distance. In the last few years there has been widespread satisfaction with the system, but some valid complaints related to wait-times, ticketing, overcrowding, and multi-modal commutes.

=== Uganda ===
Kampala, the capital of Uganda, is working to develop a light-rail system similar to Addis Ababa. China in its widespread funding of projects in Africa is also present here. The construction of the first line will cost close to US$700 million, and be entirely financed from the Chinese Export-Import Bank. The first line is envisioned to be just one part of an eventual four line network, like other African cities, this project is attempting to reduce congestion and traffic for commuters. In order to make the light-rail ticket prices competitive, it will only be 500 Shillings, which is half the price of the ticket of the informal bus network that currently exists. The trains are planned to have a capacity of 350 people, composed of three different classes. It is expected that trains will run every 5–10 minutes, with a total daily ridership of 720,000. Currently, around 70% of daily commuters travel by foot in Kampala, while others use informal buses and taxis.

=== Mauritius ===
Port Louis-Metro Express is a rail network developed in 2016 on the island country of Mauritius. Upon the system's creation it envisioned to create a system that was accessible and environmentally friendly. It is a smaller network in comparison to other African nations, but it is planned to have a total of 19 stations once completed. Once in peak service is its estimated to have a daily ridership of 55,000 people. This project is being funded entirely by India, which is a sharp contrast to the continent, where France and China dominate investing in the rail sector. The creation of the Port Louis-Metro Express is part of a larger strategy by the government of moving away from being dependent on Tourism, while also solving the worsening traffic situation on the island.

=== Reunion ===
Reunion, an overseas French department off the coast of Madagascar, has some experience with light-rail. In 2010, a larger network was proposed, but ultimately canceled due to government funding and executive leadership turnover. In 2019, a much smaller project has been proposed, due to be completed in 2022; it will consist of 18 stations mainly linking coastal areas to the island's airport.

== Southern Africa ==
=== Angola ===
Luanda is the capital and largest city of Angola, which is the economic, political, and cultural center of the country. Luanda has two different forms of urban rail transit currently. Currently, part of Luanda's eastern suburbs are served by a regular commuter rail, that runs along existing rail infrastructure. Much of the network was damaged extensively during the Angolan Civil War, so service is not as extensive as it could be, but a Chinese firm is contracted to continue the railway repairs. A light-rail project is envisioned for Luanda proper, currently, the project just passed feasibility studies in 2019. This project will complement the existing rail lines and connect more areas of Angola to Luanda, with a network of approximately 149 km of rail lines. Funding for the project is unclear, but the government assures the financing has been secured at US$3 billion this is one of the more expensive light-rail projects on the continent. In February 2020, the government signed a public-private partnership agreement with Siemens Mobility to begin the construction of the light-rail network.

=== South Africa ===
South Africa has the most extensive urban rail network on the continent, although it has no metro system. Transnet is the national company that oversees all modes of transport; any railways in South Africa operate under that umbrella organization. Urban rail or Metrorail is specifically underneath the Passenger Rail Agency of South Africa or PRASA. Metrorail is a national system with a total of 478 stations, this system though is divided into four different regions. All major regions of the country have some form of Metrorail, for example the Gauteng Metrorail region corresponds to the Gauteng province. This province is home to Johannesburg and Pretoria, the latter which is one of the three capitals of the South African state. Cape Town and other metro regions also have their respective Metrorail systems. Although Metrorail has extensive experience operating the network, in recent years it has come under the attack due to protests, labor strikes, and looting.

== Data Table ==
Country	City	System	Length km	Gauge	Power	Max Speed km/h	Started	Opened	Lines	Stations	Population millions Metro	Code	Remarks
Algeria	Algiers	SNTF	126.50	1435 mm		???			3		5.0	QQ	hh
Algeria	Algiers	Algiers Metro	13	1435 mm	750 V DC TR-SC	???	1987	2011	1	14	.	AA	kk
Algeria	Algiers	Algiers tramway	23.2	1435 mm	OHW	???		2011	1	38	.	FF	mm
Algeria	Oran	Oran tramway	18.7	1435 mm	OHW	???		2013	1	32	.	FF	mm
Algeria	Constantine	Constantine tramway	14.7	1435 mm	OHW	???		2013	1	15	.	FF	mm
Algeria	Sidi Bel Abbès	Sidi Bel Abbès tramway	13.74	1435 mm	OHW	???		2017	1	22	.	FF	mm
Algeria	Ouargla	Ouargla tramway	9.7	1435 mm	OHW	???		2018	1	16	.	FF	mm
Algeria	Sétif	Sétif tramway	22.4	1435 mm	OHW	???		2018	2	26	.	FF	mm
Angola	Luanda-Viana-Catete	Luanda Railway	65	1067 mm	Diesel	???		2010	1	14	6.5	AA	cc
Angola	Luanda	Luanda Light Rail	149		Electric							LR	u/c
Angola	Lobito	Benguela railway		1067 mm	Diesel	???					.	BB	oo
Angola	Namibe	Moçâmedes Railway		1067 mm	Diesel	???					;	JJ	dd
Benin	Cotonou-Pahou	Bénirail, Blueline	25	1000 mm	Diesel	???	2014		1		0.7	FF	cc
Egypt	Alexandria	Alexandria Tram	32			???					4.5	PP	ff
Egypt	Cairo	Cairo Metro	78	1435 mm	Electric	???	1967	1987	3	61	10.2	CC	jj
Egypt	New Administrative Capital	Cairo Light Rail Transit	70	1435 mm	Electric	???	2019	2022	1	12	??	LR	
Ethiopia	Addis Ababa	Addis Ababa Light Rail	32	1435 mm	750 V DC OHW	???	2012	2015	2	39	??	LR	
Ivory Coast	Abidjan	Abidjan Metro	37	1435 mm	Electric	80 km/h	2017		1	13	4.3	AA	cc
Kenya	Nairobi	Nairobi rail service	160	1000 mm	Diesel	???			4	26	6.5	AA	hh
Kenya	Nairobi	Nairobi Light Rail			Electric							LR	nn
Kenya	Mombasa			1435 mm ?	??	???	Prpd				1.3	PP	mm k
Kenya	Kisumu			1435 mm ?	??	???	Prpd				0.4	SS	mm k
Morocco		ONCF			3 kVDC OHW	???					0	UU	gg
Morocco	Marrakesh	Marrakesh tramway	0	1435 mm	N/A	???					!	MM	Proposed
Morocco	Casablanca	Casablanca Tramway	31	1435 mm	OHW	???	2009	2012	1	48	4.2	MM	rr
Morocco	Rabat-Salé	Rabat-Salé tramway	19	1435 mm	OHW	???		2011		31	2.1	NN	uu
Nigeria	Abuja	Abuja Light Rail	45.2	1435 mm	Diesel then Electric	80	???	Jul 2018	2	12	6.0	LR	
Nigeria	Lagos	Lagos Rail Mass Transit		1435 mm	Electric TR		???	???	2		21.0	LR	nn
Senegal	Dakar-Thiès	Petit train de banlieue	80	1000 mm	Diesel	???		1987	1		2.4	HH	ee
Senegal	Dakar	Train Express Regional	54	1435 mm	25 kV AC	160 km/h	2016	2019	1	13	4.6	HK	Airport
South Africa	Gauteng	Gautrain	80	1435 mm	25 kV AC OHW	160 to 180 km/h	2006	2010	2	10	14.3	GG	zz
South Africa	Gauteng	Metrorail Gauteng - PRASA	1450	1067 mm	3 kVDC OHW	90 km/h	1887	1889	16	219	14.3	LR	aa
South Africa	Durban	Metrorail KwaZulu-Natal - PRASA	270	1067 mm	3 kVDC OHW	90 km/h	1860	1860	7	99	3.8	XX	aa
South Africa	Port Elizabeth	Metrorail Eastern Cape - PRASA	31	1067 mm	Diesel	90 km/h	1873	1873	1	10	1.2	XX	aa
South Africa	East London	Metrorail Eastern Cape - PRASA	39	1067 mm	Diesel	90 km/h	1880	1880	1	18	0.8	XX	aa
South Africa	Cape Town	Metrorail Western Cape - PRASA	438	1067 mm	3 kVDC OHW	90 km/h	1863	1863	5	127	3.7	XX	aa
Tanzania	Dar es Salaam	Dar es Salaam commuter rail	12; 21	1067 mm 1000 mm	Diesel	???	2012	2012	2; 1		4.3	CC	zz
Tunisia	Tunis	Métro léger de Tunis	32	1435 mm	750 V DC OHW	???	1981	1986	6	66	2.6	BB	
Uganda	Kampala	Kampala Capital City Authority, Rift Valley Railways, Uganda Railways Corporation	12	1000 mm	Diesel	???	2015	2015	1	5	1.6	KK	kk
Uganda	Kampala	Greater Kampala Light Rail	35	1435 mm	750 V DC OHW	80 km/h	Prpd	?	4		1.6	LR	Proposed

=== Legend ===
- LR = Light Rail
- OHW = Over head wiring.
- TR-SC = Third Rail - Side Contact
- TR = Third Rail
- prpd = Proposed.
- U/C= Under construction.

== See also ==
- List of town tramway systems in Africa
- List of railway electrification systems
- AfricaRail
- List of bus rapid transit systems
