= Safaa Hegazy station =

Cairo Metro station

Safaa Hegazy station (Arabic: محطة صفاء حجازي) is a station served by line 3 of the Cairo Metro. It is located in Zamalek, Cairo, in front of Sharbatly apartment building and a number of embassies. The station contributes in finding of transportation modes in the area and also to reduce congestion. It was opened on 5 October 2022 as part of the Phase 3 from Attaba to Kitkat station after successful pilot runs in May and August. Originally named Zamalek station, it was renamed in honor to Safaa Hegazy who died in 2017. On 3 July 2022, President Abdel Fattah el-Sisi ordered the start of the pilot operation of the station.

The residents of the island were concerned about the impact of the construction on the older buildings. On 26 July 2020, the Sharbatly building with the adjacent Bahraini embassy were evacuated after cracks as a result of land subsidence were observed, but the National Authority Tunnels denied the construction of the station has caused it.

== Station layout ==
The station has four entrances and an elevator to the mezzanine. It also has a special path for the blind people. The station contains ticket machines that aim to reduce crowding in stations.
