= National Authority for Tunnels =

- الهيئة القومية للأنفاق
- Founded: 1983; 43 years ago
- Type: Government agency
- Purpose: Railway electrification, rapid transit
- Location: Cairo, Egypt
- Region served: Egypt
- Website: nat.gov.eg

The National Authority for Tunnels (Arabic: الهيئة القومية للأنفاق) is one of the agencies of the Ministry of Transportation in Egypt. It was established under Law No. 113 of 1983, with the aim of implementing and operating railway electrification and rapid transit projects in Egypt by conducting technical and economic research related to the project, as well as contracting and engaging foreign and local expertise in the execution of these projects. The authority owns the Cairo Metro, which operates in the Greater Cairo, the oldest metro system in Africa.

== Projects ==
- Cairo Metro
- Alexandria Metro
- High-speed rail in Egypt
- Cairo Light Rail Transit
- Cairo Monorail

== See also ==
- Egyptian National Railways
- Transport in Egypt
