= Sharbatly building =

Apartment building in Zamalek, Cairo

Sharbatly building (Arabic: عمارة الشربتلي) is a building in Zamalek, Cairo, Egypt. Built in the 1940s, it is known for housing a number of Egyptian stars, which made the building to be known as the "Celebrities building". The building was impacted by the construction of Safaa Hegazy station of the Cairo Metro system in 2020.

The building has two sections. The first section is located at 17 Brazil street and consists of twelve floors and 37 apartment units, whereas the second is located at Aziz Abaza street and consists of eleven floors and 33 apartment units. As of July 2020, sixteen units were inhabited in the first section and 28 units in the second, with the rest being vacated.

On 26 July 2020, a part of the building leaned due to the construction site of the Cairo Metro Line 3 extension towards Giza, leading to the evacuation of the building itself. As a result, the residents of the building were evacuated, and were paid LE30,000 for a temporary accommodation for a month. The building's cracks also affected the adjacent Bahraini embassy. The building was later fixed in less than two months and residents were now allowed to reenter.

== Notable residents ==
- Mahmoud el-Meliguy, screenwriter and actor
- Ezz El-Dine Zulficar, film director
- Alwiya Gamil, actress
- Soad Hosny, actress
- Nagat El-Sagheera, singer and actress
- Kawthar Shafik, actress
