= Alexandria Metro =

Proposed rapid transit in Egypt

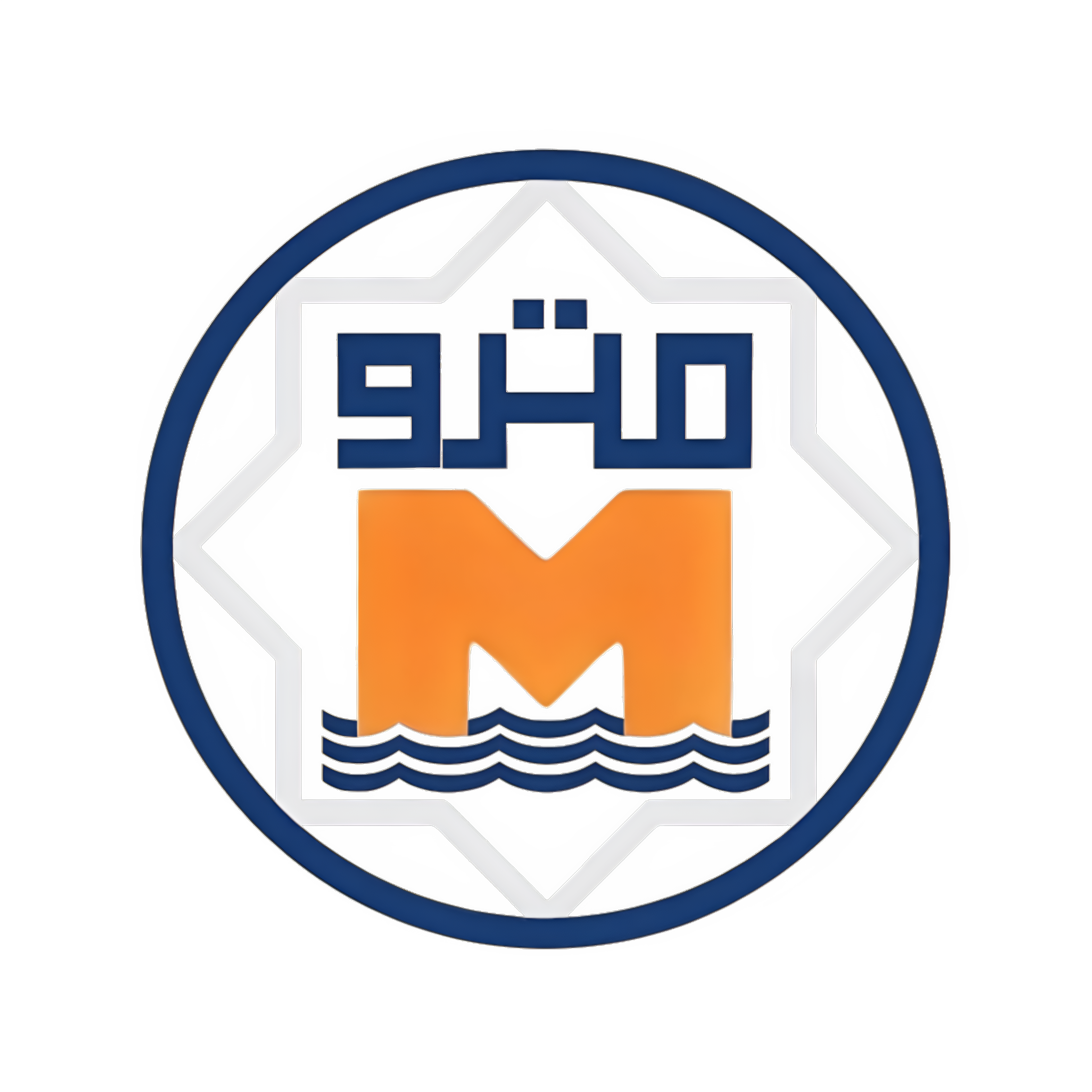

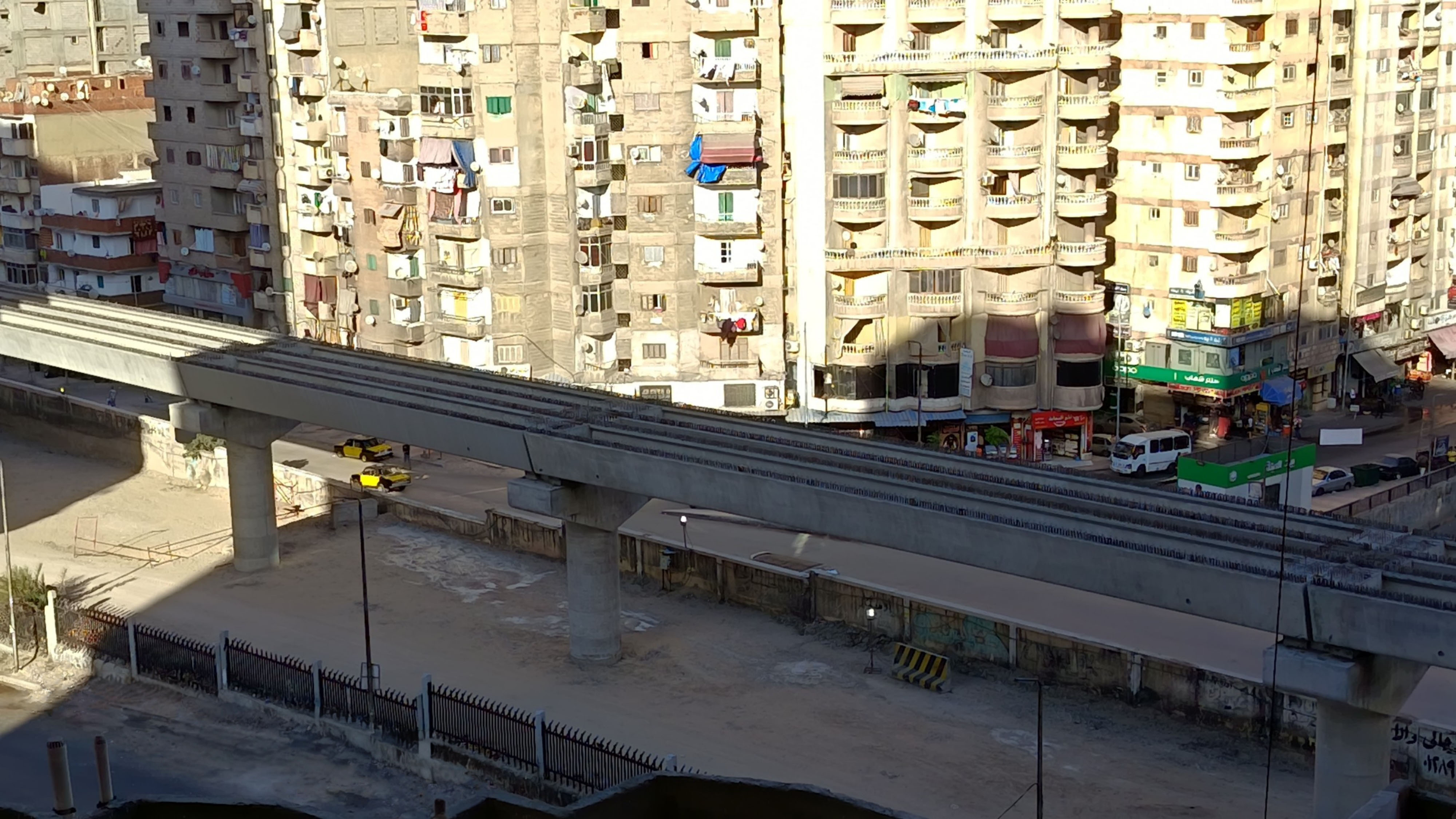
- The line under construction on 31 July 2025

Overview
- Native name: مترو أنفاق الإسكندرية
- Owner: National Authority for Tunnels
- Locale: Alexandria, Egypt
- Transit type: Rapid transit
- Number of lines: 1 (planned)
- Number of stations: 20

Operation
- Operation will start: 2027; 1 year's time

Technical
- System length: 21.7 km (13.4 mi) {13.2 km (8.2 mi) planned}
- Track gauge: 1,435 mm (4 ft 8 1/2 in) (standard gauge)

The Alexandria Metro (Egyptian Arabic: مترو الإسكندرية, romanized: Metro al-Iskandariyyah, or مترو أنفاق الإسكندرية, romanized: Metro Anfāq al-Iskandariyyah, lit. 'Alexandria Tunnel Metro') is a currently under-construction rapid transit system for Egypt's second largest city, Alexandria.

It will consist of a 21.7 km transit system designed to connect central Alexandria to Abu Qir in the northeast. Supported by international financiers, including the European Investment Bank, the European Bank for Reconstruction and Development and assisted by the Madrid Metro, the project aims to provide efficient, high-capacity urban transport to ease congestion in the city. The metro will feature 20 stations, comprising elevated, on-ground, and in the future, underground sections

Future expansion plans include a 13.2 km underground tunnel, intended to reduce travel times and ease traffic congestion, reinforcing the metro's role as a sustainable alternative to traditional transport methods.

It will be Egypt's second metro system after the Cairo Metro, the oldest metro system in Africa.

== Background ==
In March 2017, the National Authority for Tunnels (NAT) was reported to have received a Japanese offer to implement a new metro line in Egypt's Mediterranean city of Alexandria from Masr Station to New Borg El Arab City.

In 2019, the Governor of Alexandria, Abdul Aziz Qansua, announced that the construction of the Alexandria Metro will begin in either late 2019 or the first quarter of 2020, at a cost of $1.05–1.5 billion. It will be implemented over two years in three phases.

== Network ==
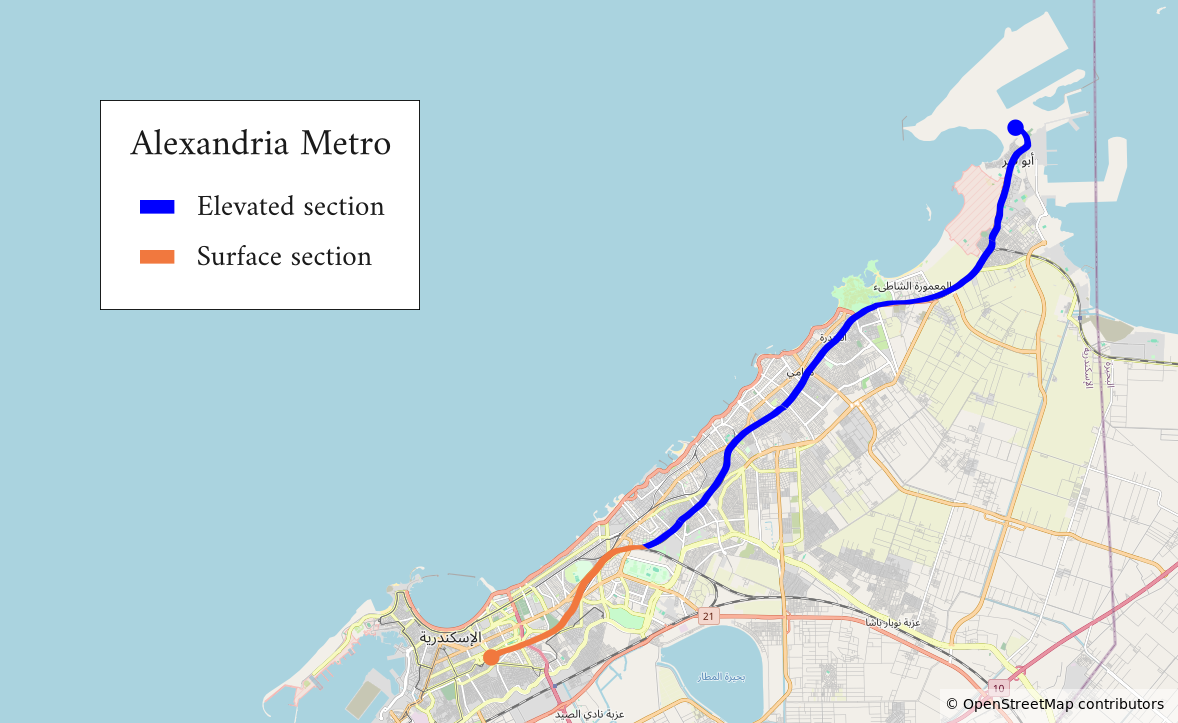
Map of Alexandria Metro

The first phase will upgrade the existing railway line from Abu Qir in the northeastern part of the city to Misr Station in the historic center of Alexandria, 21.7 km (13.5 mi) in length with 20 stations (6 surface, 14 on viaducts), including 5 new stations, parallel to the Mediterranean coast, Alexandria Corniche and the preexisting Raml lines of the Alexandria Tram. The second phase will start from Misr Station to El Max in the southwestern part of the city, again parallel to the coastline. Finally, the third stage will extend inland from the Max Station to Alkyl and then 21 km (13.0 mi) specifically starting from after Al-Zaheriya station where the line will split heading to El Max and 21 km (13.0 mi). The third phase will start from the 21 km (13.0 mi) to Borg El Arab specifically Borg El Arab Airport, linking the eastern side of the city to its western side easily. The line is expected to transport 60,000 commuters an hour for the first phase as it will operate at a max speed of 100 km/h (62.1 mph) reducing the time of the whole line from the old abo qir train at 50 mins for the whole line (not considering the intersections which made it longer) to 25 mins for the whole 21.7 km (13.5 mi) line start to finish with a reduced headway time from 10 mins to 2.5 mins, The line is also expected to serve around 1.5 million people a day.

== See also ==
- Rail transport in Egypt
- Trams in Alexandria
