= Cairo Light Rail Transit =

Commuter Rail line in Cairo, Egypt

Light Rail Transit

Overview
- Native name: القطار الكهربائي الخفيف
- Owner: National Authority for Tunnels
- Locale: Greater Cairo Area
- Transit type: Commuter rail
- Number of lines: 1
- Number of stations: 12

Operation
- Began operation: 3 July 2022
- Operator: RATP Dev
- Rolling stock: CRRC Sifang EMUs
- Number of vehicles: 22
- Train length: 6 cars

Technical
- System length: 70 km (43 mi)
- Track gauge: 1,435 mm (4 ft 8 1/2 in) standard gauge
Cairo Metro, LRT, and monorail map
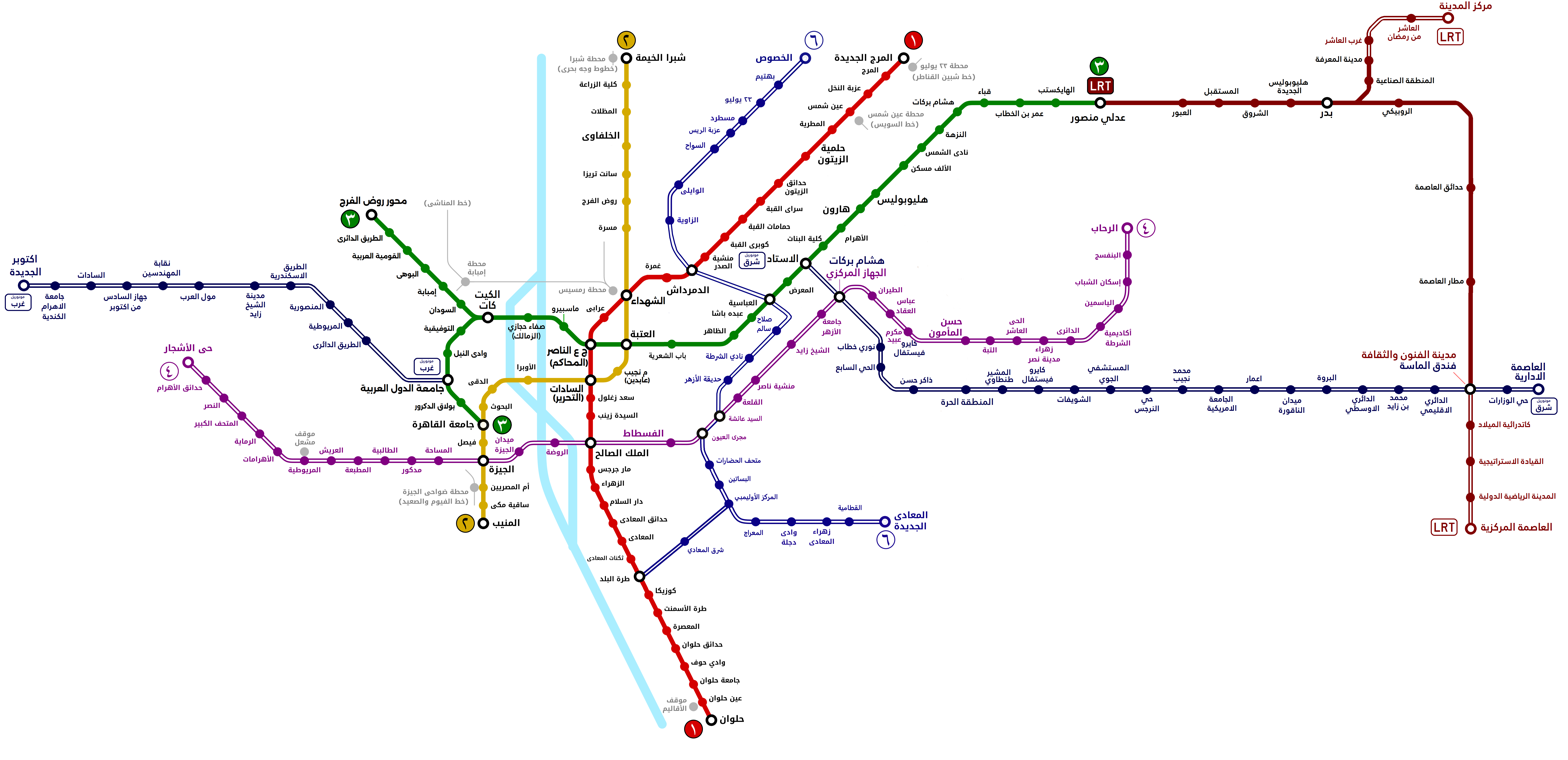

The Cairo Light Rail Transit (Arabic: القطار الكهربائي الخفيف) or Cairo LRT is an electrified regional rail system linking the city of Cairo to Egypt's New Capital and the 10th of Ramadan City. An initial 70 km route consisting of 12 stations was inaugurated on 3 July 2022.

Although it is named "Cairo Light Rail Transit", the system is not a light rail in the sense the term is commonly used among transportation professionals, where it is used for systems based on modernised tram technology. Instead the "LRT" is a system based on railway technology, with trains reaching 120 km/h during revenue service.

Further phases of the project are currently being built by a partnership between Egypt's National Authority for Tunnels and a consortium of Chinese construction companies. The full system is projected to extend over 100 km with 19 stations.

The Cairo LRT system is operated and maintained by RATP Dev and CAC (CREC and AVIC) under contract with the National Authority for Tunnels, i.e. the Egyptian Ministry for Transportation.

== History ==
The Light Rail Transit project was devised by the Egyptian government to link the New Administrative Capital to the current capital of Cairo. Additionally, the system would provide transportation to other New Urban Communities to the east of Cairo, such as 10th of Ramadan City, Badr City, Obour or El Shorouk. In August 2017, a $1.24-billion contract was signed between Egypt's National Authority for Tunnels and a consortium of China Railway Engineering Corporation and AVIC International to start construction of the project.

On 3 July 2022, an inauguration ceremony took place with the attendance of Egyptian President Abdel Fattah el-Sisi and Chinese ambassador Liao Liqiang.

== Route ==
The system links Cairo with 10th of Ramadan City and with the New Administrative Capital. The main branch of the system serves the city of Cairo in Adly Mansour station, providing an interchange with Line 3 of the Cairo Metro. The line extends east serving the New Urban Communities of El Obour, Future City, El Shorouk, New Heliopolis and Badr City. At Badr Station, the tracks separate, with one branch turning north towards 10th of Ramadan City and another turning south towards the New Administrative Capital. The northern branch currently terminates in the Knowledge City Station, in the outskirts of 10th of Ramadan. The line will reach the center of the city via an extension of 16.5 km (10.3 mi) with three more stations.

The New Administrative Capital branch turns south, serving the Capital International Airport before terminating at Arts and Culture City, which also serves as an interchange for the East Nile Line of the Cairo Monorail. The branch will serve the Nativity Cathedral and the Octagon military complex with an extension over 20.4 km (12.7 mi) and four stations over all before terminating at the future New Administrative Capital high-speed rail station. And there is another extension of 5.5 km (3.4 mi) and one station until the industrial zone under studying.

== Stations ==
Main branch
Station	Opened
Adly Mansour 3	3 July 2022
El-Obour	3 July 2022
Future	3 July 2022
El-Shorouk	3 July 2022
New Heliopolis	3 July 2022
Badr	3 July 2022

10th of Ramadan branch
Station	Opened
Industrial Park	3 July 2022
Knowledge City	3 July 2022
West of Ramadan	Under construction
10th of Ramadan	Under construction
Ramadan City Center	Under construction

New Administrative Capital branch
Station	Opened
El-Robaiky	3 July 2022
Hadayek al-Assema	3 July 2022
Capital Airport	3 July 2022
Arts and Culture City EM	3 July 2022
Nativity Cathedral	Under construction
Strategic Command	Under construction
International Sports City	Under construction
Central Capital	Under construction
Industrial Zone	Under study

== See also ==
- Cairo Monorail
- Cairo Metro
- High-speed rail in Egypt
