= Cairo Metro Line 3 =

Rapid transit line in Greater Cairo, Egypt

Line 3 Rod El Farag Corridor/Cairo University–Adly Mansour

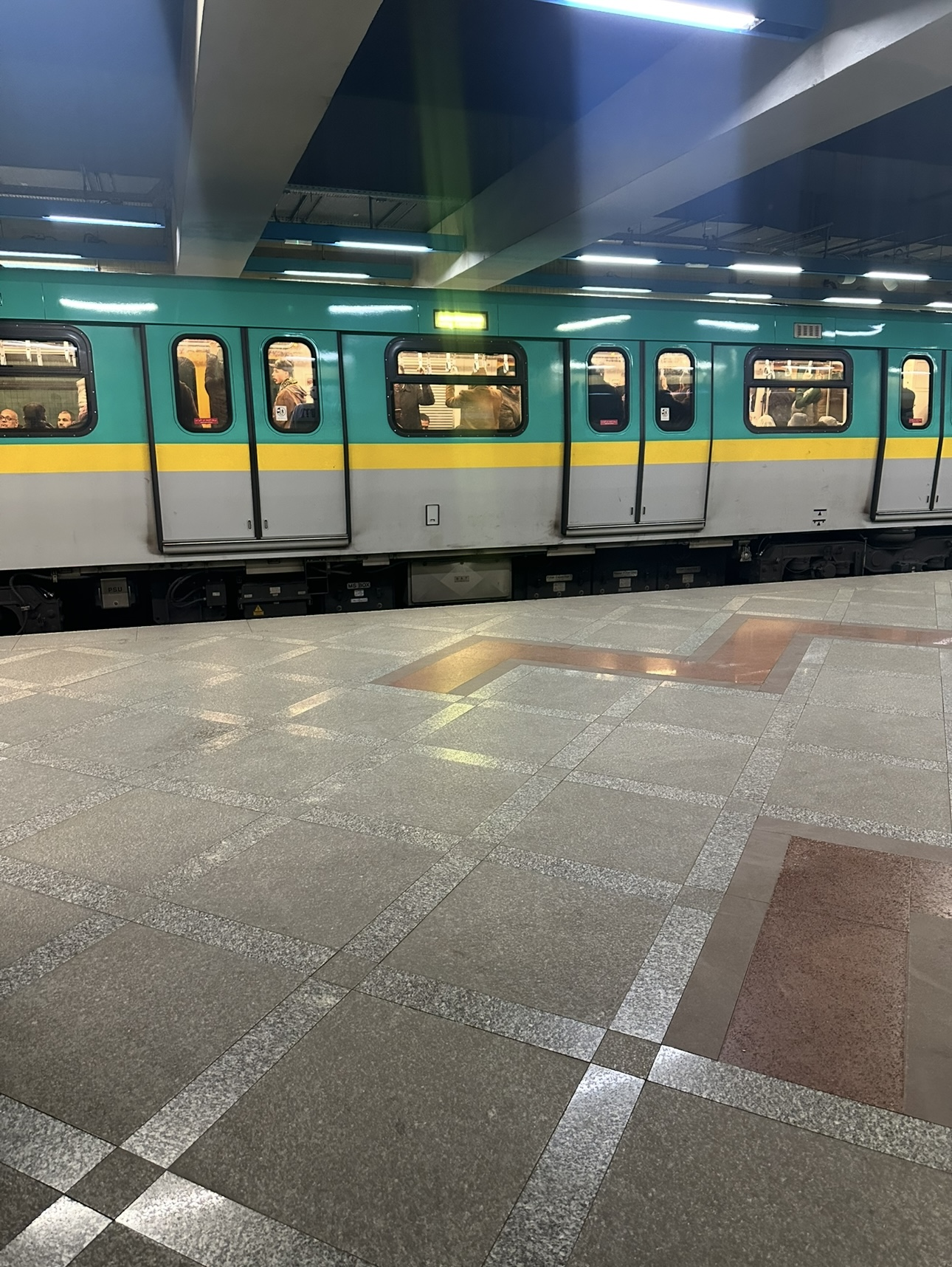
- Gameat El Dowal station

Overview
- Native name: الخط الثالث
- Owner: National Authority for Tunnels (Egyptian state)
- Locale: Greater Cairo
- Termini: Rod El Farag Corridor Cairo University; Adly Mansour
- Stations: 34 (operational); 5 (planned)

Service
- Type: Rapid transit
- System: Cairo Metro
- Operator: RATP Dev
- Daily ridership: 620,000 (2019/2020)

History
- Opened: 2012; 14 years ago
- Last extension: 2024

Technical
- Line length: 34.2 km (21.3 mi)
- Character: Subway
- Track gauge: 1,435 mm (4 ft 8 1/2 in)
- Electrification: third rail
- Operating speed: 100 km/h (62 mph)

Cairo Metro Line 3 is a main east-west line of the Cairo Metro rapid transit system in Greater Cairo, Egypt. It has a length of 34.2 km (21.3 mi) with 34 stations (21 underground, 2 at grade, 11 elevated), all built and operated in seven phases between 2007 and 2024.

As of 2024, the line is operational between Rod El Farag Corridor in Imbaba and Cairo University in El-Mohandessin and Dokki on the west bank of the Nile, and the Adly Mansour terminus on the north eastern outskirts of Cairo. The line crosses the River Nile twice at the western branch between Kit Kat and Zamalek and the eastern branch between Zamalek and downtown Cairo. The line used trains manufactured in Japan by Kinki Sharyo and Toshiba in its early phases, switching to rolling stock built by Korean-Egyptian joint venture Hyundai Rotem and NERIC in the later phases.

Line 3 is the only metro line in Cairo managed by a private operator-maintainer, namely RATP Dev within the framework of a 15-year contract signed in 2020 and in execution since June 2021.

== Construction ==
Construction began in 2006, with the first section opening on 21 February 2012. The line consist of 39 stations, 26 tunnel stations, 11 elevated stations and 2 at-grade stations. The whole line (except for the Heliopolis Square-Cairo International Airport branch) was completed in May 2024.

Line 3 was first started with the Attaba to Abbasiya section, the "first phase", followed by the second phase, from Abbasiya to Al-Ahram (Heliopolis), which are the two most urgent sections with respect to transportation needs. The design of Phase 1 needed to take into consideration the safe crossing of two major underground structures, namely, the Line 2 bored tunnel at Attaba and the wastewater spine tunnel north of Attaba. It was also planned that some of the underground stations would be used as extensive commercial centres. These stations will be constructed by the cut-and-cover method and the rolling stock will be fed by power through a third rail. Orascom Construction Industries won the tender for E£1 billion for the construction of the first phase of the project. The line has trains supplied by a joint venture of Kinki Sharyo and Toshiba and a contactless fare collection system and integrated supervision and communication system supplied by the Thales Group. France provided a 280 million dollar loan for the second phase of the project to French companies involved in the project.

=== Operational ===
Phase 1 was completed on 21 February 2012. It runs from Attaba station to Abbassia station. This first phase includes five underground stations (Attaba, Bab El Shaariya, El-Geish, Abdou Pasha, and Abbassiya) and serves the eastern part of Cairo from the city centre. 3,500 people, including 85 expatriate staff, worked on this project, which took 51 months to complete. The project was built by a consortium, led by VINCI Construction Grands Projets, comprising Bouygues Travaux Publics, Orascom and Arab Contractors. The first phase cost a total of E£4.2 billion (US$700 million). The work was delayed in September 2009, after a landslide hit the construction site on Al-Geish Street. The phase 1 civil engineering contract covered construction of a 4.3 km (2.7 mi) tunnel section and five stations. VINCI subsidiary ETF-Eurovia Travaux Ferroviaires led the consortium responsible for the track works. This included the supply and laying of 11 km (6.8 mi) of track and the power rail in the tunnel. In 2012 it was thought to eventually transport between 250,000 and 300,000 passengers per day.

Phase 2 was set to be completed in October 2013, but was pushed back, and was opened on 7 May 2014. The construction was led by consortium with VINCI, Bouygues Travaux Publics, Orascom and Arab Contractors. It is a 7.2 km (4.5 mi) tunnel. Construction work on phase 2 began in mid-2009. It runs from Abbassiya Station to Al Ahram Station in Heliopolis, with five stations, Fair Zone, Cairo Stadium, Koleyet El Banat, and Al Ahram. The costs of this phase were about 498M€, of which 1M€ was financed by a grant from the French Fund for Global Environment, 44M€ by the French Development Agency, 200M€ by the French Ministry of Finance (via the Réserve Pays Emergents) and with E£1.5 billion from the Government of Egypt.

Phase 4A was the first stage of the final phase in Line 3 which started at 2015 with a plan for it to continue where it originally left off on the eastern side of the line completing its path towards El-Nozha. It starts from Haroun El-Rashed Street and passes through Heliopolis Square and ends at Ain Shams District. It has four tunnel stations: Haroun, Heliopolis Square, Alf Masken and El Shams Club. Haroun, El Shams Club and Alf Maskan stations opened on 15 June 2019, in time for the 2019 Africa Cup of Nations, with Heliopolis station opening later on 20 October 2019.

Phase 4B starts from El-Nozha passing through Qobaa on Gesr Al-Suez Street then towards Hikestep district and ends at Adly Mansour Station in El-Salam City (near El-Asher Bus Stop). It has six elevated stations. This stage has been completed and was opened to the public by the president on 16 August 2020.

Phase 3A was set to begin in 2011, led by a consortium with Orascom and Arab Contractors as the main contractors for the project; this phase connects Attaba Station with the already existing Gamal Abdel Nasser Station through 26 July Street, then continues on its way onto northern Maspero (new station) and run under both branches of the Nile passing through Zamalek island at Safaa Hegazy station and ending at Kit Kat station under the Kit Kat Square. It was delayed due to the uprising in Egypt. Construction of the western branch of Line 3 started in September 2017, and this first section opened on 6 October 2022.

Construction of phase 3B from Kit Kat Station going under Sudan Street (new station) then through Imbaba to the cross point of the Ring Road and ending at Rod al-Farag Axis with 6.6 km (4.1 mi) length and six new stations over all continued until 2023, this extension began revenue service on 1 January 2024. The project included a main workshop adjacent to the western terminal of the line and a light repair workshop at the middle of the line at Abbassia station.

Phase 3C started from Kit Kat station heading towards Al Tawfikiya (new tunnel station) passing through Mohandessin under Wadi Al-Nil and Gamaet Al Dowal streets (both streets have one tunnel station each), then headed to Bulak Al-Dakror Station, which is at grade, and ending at the elevated Cairo University station, where Line 2 and Line 3 are connected to each other. This stage with additional 5.1 km (3.2 mi) opened on 15 May 2024.

=== Proposed ===
Phase 4C is proposed to start from Heliopolis station passing through Al-Hegaz Square and Military Academy area to Sheraton District and after 7.0 km (4.3 mi) ending at Cairo International Airport. If built, it would have five tunnel stations. There is no proposed completion date for this phase.

== Connections ==
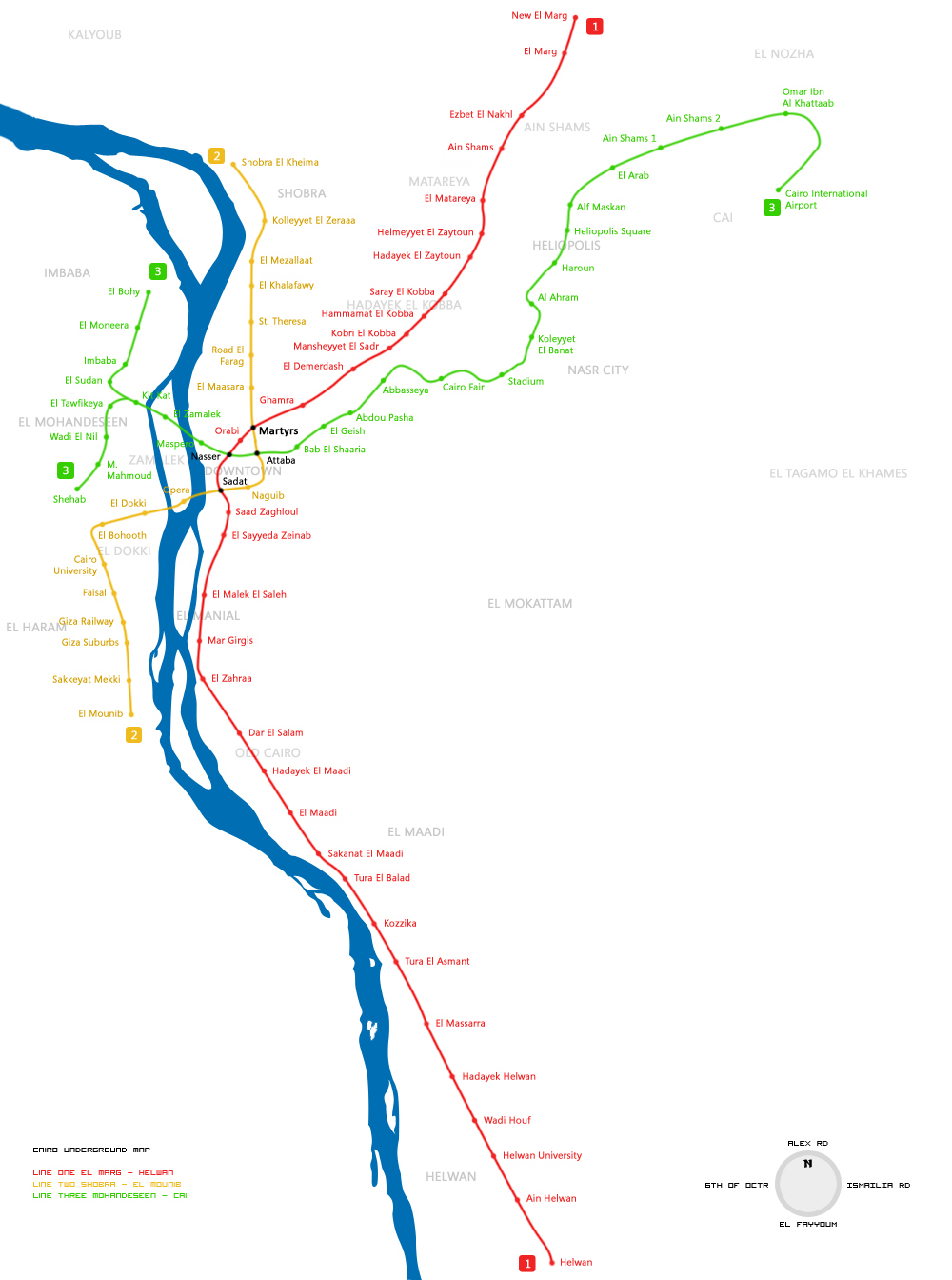
The line operates from Rod Al Farag Corridor and Cairo University to Adly Mansour.

=== To other Metro lines ===
Line 3 connects with Line 1 at Nasser station and with Line 2 at Cairo University and Attaba stations.

=== To other forms of transit ===
Line 3 riders can access Egyptian National Railways long-haul and short-haul domestic passenger service via transfer to Line 2 or Line 1 and debarkation at Al-Shohadaa Station near Ramses Station and the line terminus at Adly Mansour which has the Cairo-Suez line. Cairo Transport Authority buses and private microbus services are also nearby.

The Cairo LRT is a commuter rail line linking the New Administrative Capital with Cairo. The line starts at Adly Mansour Station at Al Salam City providing a transfer to the Cairo Metro Line 3, and splits into two branches at Badr station. The northern branch runs parallel to the Regional Ring Road, reaching 10th of Ramadan City. The southern branch connects to the New Administrative Capital. Intermediate cities along the train's route include Obour, El Shorouk, and Future City.

Line 3 is also slated to connect to both Monorail projects in the Greater Cairo Area. The East Nile (New Administrative Capital) Line terminates at Stadium station, while the West Nile (6th of October City) Line will eventually connect to Line 3 in Wadi El-Nile station, part of the line's western expansion plans of phase 3C.

== Criticism ==
During the very first phase of construction in 2009 there was a 10 metres (33 ft) deep sinkhole in the road in a muddy area reclaimed from the Nile; a car was swallowed by the sinkhole, but there was no structural damage to the surrounding buildings.

When construction began, residents of the historic island of Zamalek were concerned that the location of the station was not opportune. A complaint was filed to the European Investment Bank, which helped finance the project, after which the complaint was dismissed. The residents fears were nevertheless confirmed on 26 July 2020, when the Sharbatly building, an apartment building above one of the construction sites, subsided and was evacuated. The fence of the adjoining Bahraini embassy also showed signs of damage.

== See also ==
- List of Cairo Metro stations
