= Greater Kampala Light Rail =

The Greater Kampala Light Rail is a modern light rail system under construction in Kampala, Uganda, and is being built by the China Civil Engineering Construction Corporation.

== Lines ==
- Kampala-Namanve via Nakawa, Kinawataka, Banda, Kireka and Bweyogerere (12 km east);
- Kampala-Lubowa via Kibuye, Najjanankumbi and Zana (7 km);
- Kampala-Kyengera via Katwe, Kibuye, Ndeeba, Nalukolongo and Natete (7 km); and
- Kampala-Kawempe via City Square, Buganda Road, Wandegeya, Mulago, Kubbiri and Bwaise (9 km north).

Ultimately the lines will extend to the area of

- Entebbe 37 km southwest.
- Nsangi 20 km west.
- Wakiso 20 km .
- and other surrounding towns.

Total route-km is 35 km in phase 1; ultimate length 240 km.

== Specifications ==
- Track gauge, Standard Gauge (1.435 m)
- Number of tracks, two (double line)
- Gradient, 5% (maximum)
- Curvature, 30 m radius (minimum)
- Traction, electric 750 V DC overhead
- Right-of-way width, 9–15 m
- Design life, 60 years
- Speed, 80 km/h (maximum)
- Train set length, 30 m
- Inter-station distance, 0.5 - 2.0 km
