= Cairo University station =

Metro station in Giza

Coordinates: 30.0250°N 31.2014°E

Cairo University جامعة القاهرة
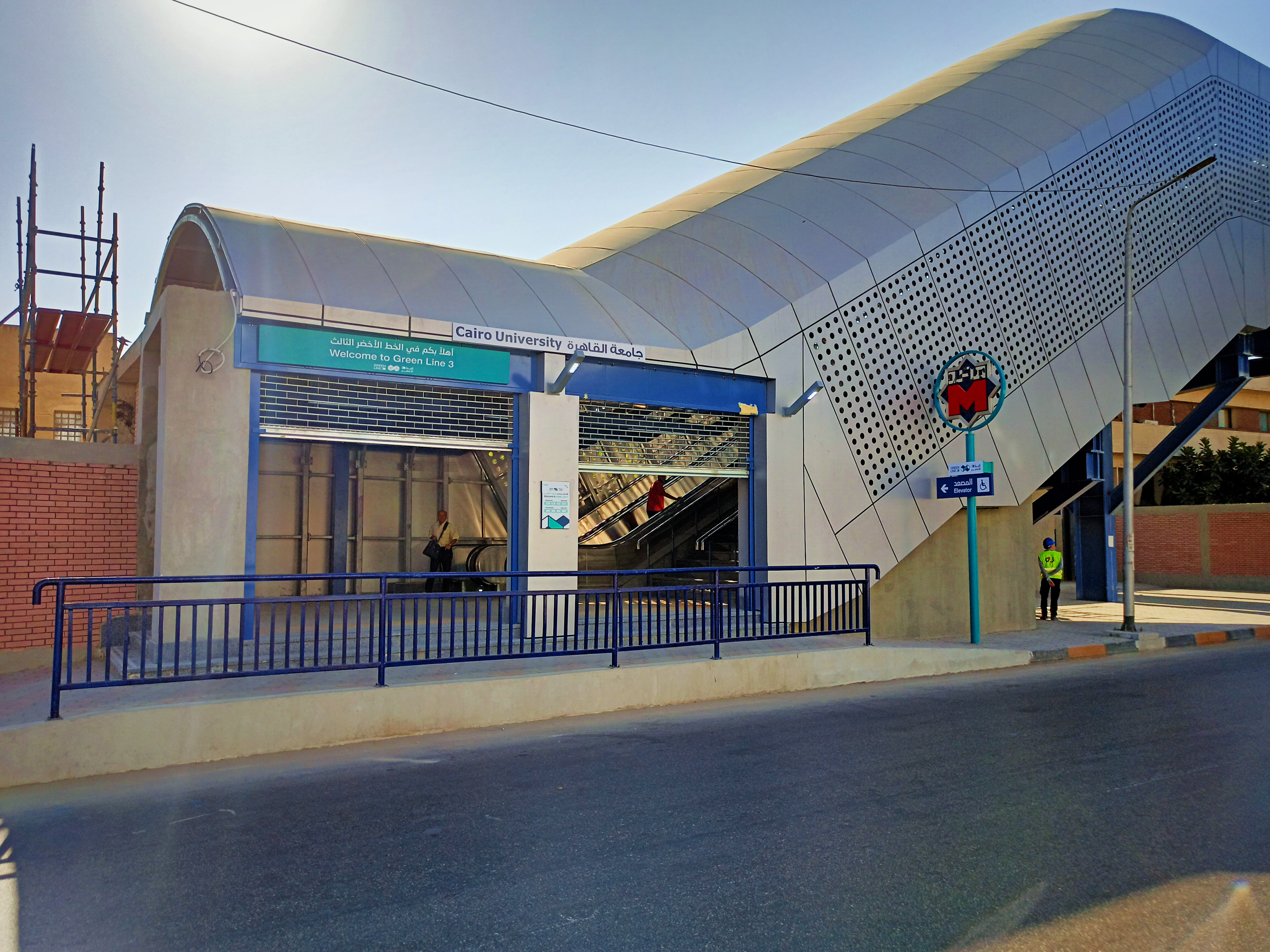
- Cairo University station in May 2024

General information
- Location: Giza Governorate; Egypt
- System: Cairo Metro station
- Lines: Line 2; Line 3

Construction
- Accessible: Yes (Line 3 only)
Location

Cairo University is a station in Cairo Metro that serves as an interchange station between the Cairo University branch of Line 3 and Line 2, with the station being the terminus of the former. It serves the main Cairo University campus in Giza, Egypt.

The Line 2 station was opened on 19 April 1999 as part of the extension from Sadat station, and served as the terminus before being extended to Omm El-Masryeen station.

The Line 3 station was opened on 15 May 2024 as part of Phase 3C of the line. The station can be accessed by three entrances: two of them from Boulak El Dakrour district to the west and another from Sudan Street and the campuses to the east. There is also a stairway-only transfer path to the original Line 2 station. The new station was constructed to reduce congestion at Attaba station and to provide additional transportation options for university students.
