= Adly Mansour Transportation Hub =

Interchange station in Cairo, Egypt

Coordinates: 30°08′48″N 31°25′16″E

The Adly Mansour Transportation Hub is in Cairo, Egypt. It was inaugurated on 3 July 2022 by the Egyptian president Abdel Fattah el-Sisi, and was named in honour of Adly Mansour, former President of the Supreme Constitutional Court. Located in as-Salam district, the complex connects five different transportation modes: the Cairo Metro, the Cairo Light Rail Transit, the Cairo–Suez railway, the SuperJet regional buses, and Bus Rapid Transit services. It is bordered to the north by Ismailia Road, to the north and east by the ring road, to the south by a depot of Cairo Metro line 3, and to the west by property owned by the Ministry of Civil Aviation. With an area of 15 feddans (6.3 hectares), the station has been described as the largest transportation hub in the Middle East.

== Services ==
The Adly Mansour station serves as the terminus of Line 3. It was inaugurated as part of the fourth phase of the line on 16 August 2020. The station has an area of 3,700 m (12,100 ft) and consists of three levels, with a total size of 10,000 m^{2} (110,000 sq ft). The ground level contains twelve ticket booths, two ticket vending machines, and 23 turnstiles. Four escalators and two elevators take passengers from the ground level to the first level. The first level includes control rooms and two musallas, and eight escalators take passengers from the first level to the platforms. The station has three tracks; two are for revenue service and are used to terminate trains, and the third is used for station storage and arrivals to the train depot. The station is secured by 65 internal and external surveillance cameras.

Near to the station is a depot used for maintenance of the Cairo Metro trains; it is considered the largest depot in the Middle East and Africa. The depot has an area of 65 feddans and consists of 32 maintenance buildings, with the capacity to store up to 30 trains.

The complex also includes a bus stop which is served by three bus services: the SuperJet for transportation between governorates, the electric rapid bus transit (BRT) linking the hub to Cairo International Airport, and another BRT linking to Al Salam and Obour bus stops. The bus stop has an area of 1.5 feddans and includes a building that provides services to passengers and a bus area with a capacity of 24 buses. Sabri Ayoub, president of the administrative council of SuperJet, stated that the stop contains the first bus charging station in Egypt with four chargers, capable of charging up to eight electric buses. The transportation hub contains a two-story mall and a "bedroom" that acts as a parking area with an area of 16,000 square metres (170,000 sq ft). The hub also includes 31,000 square metres (330,000 sq ft) of green space, an 11,000-square-metre (120,000 sq ft) waiting area for cars, and a 1,300-metre (4,300 ft) network of roads, as well as 200 metres (660 ft) of pedestrian tunnels.

== Awards ==
The American magazine Engineering News-Record named the station the best rail project of 2022. That year, Luxury Lifestyle Awards presented the award for the "Best Luxury Public Services Architecture" to the architectural firm Archplan for its work on the project.
