= Rod El Farag Corridor station =

Metro station in Cairo, Egypt

Coordinates: 30.1019°N 31.1844°E

Rod El Farag Corridor محور روض الفرج

General information
- Location: Giza Governorate; Egypt
- Line(s): Cairo Metro Line 3
- Platforms: 1 island platform and 1 side platform
- Tracks: 3

Construction
- Accessible: Yes

History
- Opened: 1 January 2024

Rod El Farag Corridor is the western terminus of Cairo Metro Line 3's Rod El Farag Corridor branch that opened on 1 January 2024 as part of Phase 3B of that line. It is located in the El-Kom El-Ahmar area in Giza Governorate and serves a few other villages. The station is next to the corridor of the same name and is accessible from other nearby roads such as El-Zomor Canal. It is also linked to a railway station at El-Kom El-Ahmar by an overpass. It also has a car waiting area. Construction of the station commenced in 2019.
