= List of Cairo Metro stations =

The Cairo Metro is a rapid transit system in Egypt that serves Greater Cairo, including the governorates of Cairo, Giza and Qalyubia. It opened on 27 September 1987, making it the first metro system in both Africa and the Arab world. Most of the network runs underground through the dense city centre, while sections in the outer districts emerge to run at grade or on elevated viaducts.

The system is currently composed of three operating lines — Line 1 (Red), Line 2 (Blue) and Line 3 (Green) — with a total of 89 stations as of the latest count, including five interchange stations: Sadat, Al-Shohadaa, Nasser, Attaba and Cairo University. It is owned by the National Authority for Tunnels, an Egyptian state body, though day-to-day operation is split between operators: the Egyptian Company for Metro Management & Operation runs Lines 1 and 2, while Line 3 is operated by RATP Dev.

Most of the network fans out from the city centre along the Nile, with Line 1 running roughly north–south between Helwan and New El-Marg, Line 2 between Shubra El-Kheima and El-Mounib, and Line 3 running east–west between Adly Mansour and Rod El-Farag / Cairo University. The combined system length is 106.8 kilometres, and the Cairo Metro is among the busiest metro systems in the world, carrying around 5 million passengers a day and roughly 1.46 billion passengers a year.

A fourth line is currently under construction. Phase One of Line 4 will run from Hadayeq Al-Ashgar station to Al-Fustat station, covering 19 km with 17 stations, and is expected to be completed and operational in the first half of 2028. The new line will notably interchange with Line 1 at El-Malek El-Saleh station and Line 2 at Giza station, and will bring the metro to areas including Faisal, Omraneya, Nasr City and Al-Azhar University, along with a dedicated station serving the Giza Pyramids and the Grand Egyptian Museum. A second phase, adding a further 31.8 km and 21 stations, is already being planned to extend the line toward New Cairo.

The following is a list of the current in service 89 stations and the other planned stations on the Cairo Metro.

== Line 1 ==
Station	Arabic name	Location	Opened
Helwan	حلوان		1987
Ain Helwan	عين حلوان		1987
Capital University metro station	جامعة العاصمة		2002
Wadi Hof	وادي حوف		1995
Hadayek Helwan	حدائق حلوان		1997
El-Maasara	المعصرة		26 Sep 1987
Tora El-Asmant	طرة الأسمنت		1987
Kozzika	كوتسيكا		1993
Tora El-Balad	طرة البلد		1987
Sakanat El-Maadi	ثكنات المعادي		1992
Maadi	المعادي		1995
Hadayek El-Maadi	حدائق المعادي		1992
Dar El-Salam	دار السلام		1988
El-Zahraa'	الزهراء		1997
Mar Girgis (Note: In English called: Saint George)	مار جرجس		1992
El-Malek El-Saleh	الملك الصالح		1995
Al-Sayeda Zeinab	السيدة زينب		1987
Saad Zaghloul	سعد زغلول		1987
Sadat	السادات		26 Sep 1987
Nasser	جمال عبدالناصر		1987
Orabi	عرابي		1987
Al-Shohadaa (Note: Previously called: Mubarak)	الشهداء		26 Sep 1987
Ghamra	غمرة		1989
El-Demerdash	الدمرداش		Apr 1989
Manshiet El-Sadr	منشية الصدر		1989
Kobri El-Qobba	كوبري القبة		1989
Hammamat El-Qobba	حمامات القبة		1989
Saray El-Qobba	ساراي القبة		1989
Hadayeq El-Zaitoun	حدائق الزيتون		1989
Helmeyet El-Zaitoun	حلمية الزيتون		1989
El-Matareyya	المطرية		1989
Ain Shams	عين شمس		1989
Ezbet El-Nakhl	عزبة النخل		1989
El-Marg	المرج		5 Apr 1989
New El-Marg	المرج الجديدة		1999

== Line 2 ==
Station	Arabic name	Location	Opened
El-Mounib	المنيب		17 Jan 2005
Sakiat Mekky	ساقية مكي		17 Jan 2005
Omm El-Masryeen (Note: Previously called: Giza Suburbs)	أم المصريين		8 Oct 2000
Giza station	الجيزة		8 Oct 2000
Faisal	فيصل		8 Oct 2000
Cairo University	جامعة القاهرة		19 Apr 1999
El Bohoth	البحوث		19 Apr 1999
Dokki	الدقي		19 Apr 1999
Opera	الأوبرا		19 Apr 1999
Sadat	السادات		26 Sep 1987
Mohamed Naguib	محمد نجيب		Sep 1998
Attaba	العتبة		1 Sep 1998
Al-Shohadaa	الشهداء		26 Sep 1987
Masarra	مسرة		1 Oct 1996
Road El-Farag	روض الفرج		1 Oct 1996
St. Teresa	سانتا تريزا		1 Oct 1996
Khalafawy	الخلفاوي		1 Oct 1996
Mezallat	المظلات		1 Oct 1996
Kolleyyet El-Zeraa	كلية الزراعة		1 Oct 1996
Shubra El-Kheima	شبرا الخيمة		1 Oct 1996

== Line 3 ==
Station	Arabic name	Location	Opened
Adly Mansour	عدلي منصور		2020
El Haykestep	الهايكستب		2020
Omar Ibn El-Khattab	عمر بن الخطاب		2020
Qobaa	قباء		2020
Hesham Barakat	هشام بركات		2020
El-Nozha	النزهة		2020
Nadi El-Shams	نادي الشمس		2019
Alf Maskan	ألف مسكن		2019
Heliopolis Square	ميدان هليوبوليس		2019
Haroun	هارون		2019
Al-Ahram	الأهرام		2014
Koleyet El-Banat	كلية البنات		2014
Stadium	الإستاد		2014
Fair Zone	أرض المعارض		2014
Abbassia	العباسية		2012
Abdou Pasha	عبده باشا		2012
El Geish	الجيش		2012
Bab El Shaaria	باب الشعرية		2012
Attaba	العتبة		1 Sep 1998
Nasser	جمال عبدالناصر		1987
Maspero	ماسبيرو		5 Oct 2022
Safaa Hegazy	صفاء حجازي		5 Oct 2022
Kit Kat	الكيت كات		5 Oct 2022
Sudan	السودان		1 Jan 2024
Imbaba	إمبابة		1 Jan 2024
El-Bohy	البوهي		1 Jan 2024
El-Qawmia	القومية		1 Jan 2024
Ring Road	الطريق الدائري		1 Jan 2024
Rod al-Farag Corridor	محور روض الفرج		1 Jan 2024
Tawfikia	التوفيقية		15 May 2024
Wadi El Nile	وادي النيل		15 May 2024
Gamat El Dowal	جامعة الدول العربية		15 May 2024
Boulak El Dakrour	بولاق الدكرور		15 May 2024
Cairo University	جامعة القاهرة		19 Apr 1999

The currently in service sections of this line are from Ring Road Station-Adly Mansour Station and from Cairo University Station-Adly Mansour Station.

== Future lines ==
=== Line 4 ===
- Hadayek Al Ashgar حدائق الأشجار
- Ahram Gardens حدائق الأهرام
- ُEl Nasr النصر
- The Grand Egyptian Museum المتحف المصري الجديد
- Remaya Square ميدان الرماية
- Pyramids الأهرام
- Maryoteya المريوطية
- Arish العريش
- El Matbaa المطبعة
- Talbeya الطالبية
- Madkor مدكور
- El Mesaha المساحة
- Giza الجيزة
  - Interchange with Line 2
- Giza Square ميدان الجيزة
- Manyal المنيل
- El-Malek El-Saleh الملك الصالح
  - Interchange with Line 1
- Magra El-Oyoun مجرى العيون
- Salah Eldin Citadel قلعة صلاح الدين
- ElMalek Mansour -Salah Salem Intersect- -الملك منصور -تقاطع صلاح سالم
- The 6th District -ElHay ElSadis- الحي السادس
- ElTayaran الطيران
- Abbas ElAkkad عباس العقاد
- Makram Ebeid مكرم عبيد
- Ahmed ElZomor أحمد الزمر
- El-Methaq الميثاق
- Police Academy أكاديمية الشرطة

This line is till under study, construction of the first phase (El Malek El Saleh - Giza) expected to start in early 2016 according to NAT.

=== Other lines ===
There are also plans for other lines including a circular line (Line 5) connecting Lines 1, 2, 3 and 4 along with the final line (Line 6) which will run from Shubra up-north until the heart of Maadi and Helwan districts in the south through running from Attaba Station (Interchange with both Line 2 and Line 3) through El Kalaa street شارع القلعة in bored tunnels to Salah Eldin Citadel Station (Interchange with Line 4) and moving on from there to both districts via bored tunnels using the existing route El-Mahager Railway as a guide through both Maadi and Helwan.

Both these lines will not take place before finishing both Line 3 and Line 4.
