= Bashteel railway station =

Railway station in Egypt

Bashteel Railway Station

General information
- Location: Bashteel, Giza Governorate; Egypt
- Coordinates: 30°03′58.3″N 31°11′19.71″E
- System: Egyptian Railways general passenger rail station
- Owner: Egyptian National Railways
- Lines: Cairo - Alexandria; Alexandria - Aswan
- Platforms: 10
- Connections: Cairo Monorail (under construction); Cairo Transport Authority bus Microbus

Construction
- Structure type: At-grade

History
- Opened: 7 November 2024
Location

Bashteel Railway Station (Arabic: محطة بشتيل), also called Upper Egypt Railway Station (Arabic: محطة قطارات صعيد مصر), is a major railway station in Giza, Egypt, located in the Bashteel district of the city. It is intended to serve as a new major railway hub in Greater Cairo and to relieve congestion at Ramses Station.

Construction of the station began in 2020 after plans to build a new railway station in order to reduce congestion at Ramses Station were announced. On 12 October 2024, the station was initially inaugurated, and the station later opened on 7 November 2024 to the public.

== Location ==
The station is located in the middle of a railway junction between the Bashteel and Agouza districts of the Giza Governorate, in the west of Greater Cairo. The tracks that split to the east cross the Nile River to reach Ramses railway station in Cairo, while the western tracks travel north on the west bank of the Nile. The tracks to the south reach Giza.

== History ==
Plans to build a new railway station in the Bashteel district of the Giza Governorate were announced in March 2019 by Egyptian Transport Minister Kamel al-Wazir. The Government of Egypt claimed the construction of the station was motivated by the need to reduce pressure from the main Ramses railway station, which received about 20 percent of the total daily commuter traffic. The project would be divided in two phases; the first centered on a new railway maintenance complex and the second on the passenger station.

Construction started in August 2020. The works were awarded to an Egyptian construction company, Hassan Allam Holding, which would enter a partnership with the Ministry of Transportation and the Egyptian Railway Authority to build the station. The worksite occupied a 31.000 square meter plot of land on the mainline railway line between Giza railway station and Ramses railway station, by the Agouza district in the area known as Mohandiseen.

An official inauguration of the station was held on 12 October 2024. It was attended by President Abdel Fattah El-Sisi and Transport Minister Kamel al-Wazir. Officials claimed the station had capacity for 250.000 daily passengers, featuring 12 platforms and 28 ticket windows. The station complex also includes a shopping centre, hotel, multi-storey car park, besides new office space and housing.

The station opened to the public on 7 November 2024, with 10 platforms in service.

== Structure ==
The design of the station is inspired by Ancient Egypt, with a 40-metre-tall glass pyramid and four obelisks at the center of the station building.

Bashteel is a junction station, with six platforms on the railway line towards Ramses railway station to the north-east and four platforms on the north-south line on the west bank of the Nile between Al-Manashy and Giza station. The station building is triangular, with tracks splitting to its south and platforms on the eastern and western facades of the building.

The station features a train maintenance and repair workshop, and a platform dedicated to freight.

== Train services ==
While Ramses railway station remains open and still handles a significant amount of traffic, it is expected that most rail service between Cairo and Upper Egypt will be gradually moved to Bashteel.

On 12 October 2024, an order was issued which states that the following train services would stop at Bashteel railway station:

- VIP trains 2006 / 976 / 996 – 2011 / 981 / 983 / 935
- Sleeping trains 1086 / 86 / 82 / 1088 and 87 / 83 / 1087 / 1089

In addition, sleeping train services 934 / 980 / 2010 / 982 – 2007 / 977 / 997 would stop at the station on 13 October 2024.

As of November 2024, the following trains pass through the station:

- Trains 1093 / 2015 / 2013 / 1109 (Aswan–Cairo)
- Train 185 (Sohag–Port Said)
- Train 891 (Asyut–Cairo)
- Train 89 (Aswan–Alexandria)

== Connecting services ==
While the station features no direct connection to the Cairo Metro, several stations of the Line 3 branch to Cairo University are located in its vicinity (Tawfikia and Wadi El Nile stations). The currently under construction Cairo Monorail line to 6th of October City and Cairo's bus rapid transit project are planned to serve the station.

== See also ==
- Egyptian National Railways
- Ramses Station
- Cairo Metro
- Cairo Monorail
- Cairo LRT
