= Cairo Bus Rapid Transit =

Bus rapid transit system in Cairo, Egypt

Bus Rapid Transit (BRT)
- Service area: Greater Cairo
- Service type: Bus rapid transit
- Stations: 48
- Fleet: 100 buses
- Fuel type: Electric
- Operator: Ministry of Transport

The Cairo Bus Rapid Transit (Arabic: الاتوبيس الترددي السريع BRT), or Cairo BRT, is a mass transit project implemented in Greater Cairo, Egypt by the Ministry of Transport as a modern alternative to traditional microbus services and will complement the proposed fifth line of the Cairo Metro. The system operates along the Cairo Ring Road and is designed to integrate with other public transportation networks, including metro lines, trains, and superjet buses.

The project is structured in three phases and includes 48 stations distributed along the ring road, with an estimated total cost of approximately EGP 9.5 billion. Access to bus stations located above the ring road is facilitated through pedestrian tunnels or escalators. Car parks are provided beneath the stations. Once fully operational, the fleet of electric buses will run on fixed schedules and be equipped with passenger-friendly amenities, including air conditioning, on-board Wi-Fi, and real-time trip information displays. Microbuses will be prohibited on the Cairo Ring Road, with dedicated BRT lanes reserved exclusively for the new buses, except in emergency cases, when access will be permitted for ambulances and fire services.

The system is designed to operate 100 electric buses with connections to service stops below the ring road. Operations are scheduled 24 hours a day in three shifts. Stations are equipped with electronic displays to provide real-time bus arrival and departure information, with buses expected at intervals of approximately 10 minutes. The fare system includes both fixed and flexible ticket options, with the latter linked to the number of stations traveled, calculated based on distance.

== History ==
In 2015, the Institute for Transportation and Development Policy (ITDP), with support from UN-Habitat Egypt, conducted a pre-feasibility assessment for implementing a bus rapid transit system in Greater Cairo. The study evaluated corridors in Cairo, New Cairo, and Giza as potential BRT routes, aiming to identify cost-effective solutions to the region's growing traffic congestion. ITDP held consultations with local planning authorities and gathered preliminary data on road segments with high public demand. The report served as an early planning step that informed later stages of the BRT project.

In support of the development of a bus rapid transit system along Greater Cairo's western corridor, linking 6th of October with central Giza, the New Urban Communities Authority has worked alongside international partners to study models of effective transport reform. In 2025, the ITDP, in collaboration with Swedfund and UN-Habitat, organized a study tour to Mexico City for Egyptian officials. The visit provided insights into how Mexico integrated its Mexico City Metrobús system with broader sustainable transport policies, including bikeshare programs, cable cars, and transit fare integration. Participants examined approaches to public-private partnerships, regulatory frameworks, and operator engagement, with particular focus on formalizing informal transit sectors. The experience informed Cairo's own strategy for industry transition, infrastructure design, and community-based planning. The trial operation commenced in April 2025, with the Ministry of Transport deploying 10 buses along the Cairo Ring Road to train drivers and test operational parameters such as station stops and headway intervals. The trial forms part of the first phase of the BRT rollout, covering a 35-kilometre stretch from the Alexandria Agricultural Road to the Police Academy and encompassing 14 stations. This phase is designed to replace microbuses on the ring road, intending to alleviate congestion and providing more transit alternatives.

On 3 June 2025, trial operations started on the BRT by opening the first phase of the route, with the BRT fully operational on 3 July of that year.

== Network ==
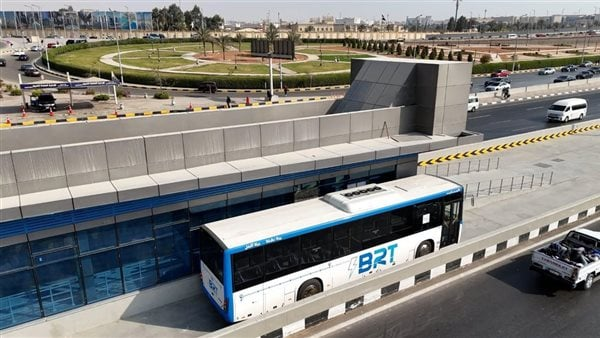
An Egyptian-made BRT bus at the Police Academy Station on Cairo's Ring Road

The network is being implemented in three phases, ultimately spanning 48 stations along the Ring Road. Designed to reduce congestion and provide a high-capacity alternative to microbuses, the system aims to modernize travel across Greater Cairo's primary orbital highway. The first phase comprises 14 stations from Alexandria Agricultural Road to the Police Academy, while the second phase will add 21 more stations between Field Marshal Tantawi Axis and the Fayoum intersection, including stops at Mariouteya, Haram, Faisal, Tersa, and the Grand Egyptian Museum. The third and final phase will include 13 stations from Alexandria Agricultural Road to the Alexandria Desert Road. The BRT corridor is integrated with key transportation nodes, offering connections to the Cairo Light Rail Transit at the Adly Mansour station and to metro line 1 and line 3 at stations such as Al-Zahraa, El Marg, Adly Mansour, and Imbaba. The route is designed to bridge Cairo's eastern and western zones while extending accessibility to the New Administrative Capital.

- Phase 1: 14 stations from Alexandria Agricultural Road to the Police Academy.
- Phase 2: 21 stations from Field Marshal Tantawi to the Fayoum intersection, including three stations on the Mariouteya-Haram-King Faisal-Tersa axis and the Grand Egyptian Museum station.
- Phase 3: 13 stations from Alexandria Agricultural Road to the Alexandria Desert Road.

== Vehicles ==
The BRT system is planned to operate 100 locally manufactured MCV BRT-spec electric buses. Production is being carried out in Egypt by the Ministry of Military Production, MCV, MAN (represented by Kastour Group), and Geyushi Motors, with local components comprising an estimated 50 to 60 percent of the total manufacturing content. The fleet will include three types of vehicles, single, double, and triple-articulated electric buses, with passenger capacities ranging from 95 to 300. Additional buses are planned to be introduced in line with the expansion of the Ring Road and the implementation of subsequent BRT phases.

== See also ==
- Cairo Metro
- Cairo Light Rail Transit
- Cairo Monorail
- Transport in Egypt
