= Nasser station =

Metro station in Cairo

Coordinates: 30.0536°N 31.2388°E

Nasser جمال عبد الناصر
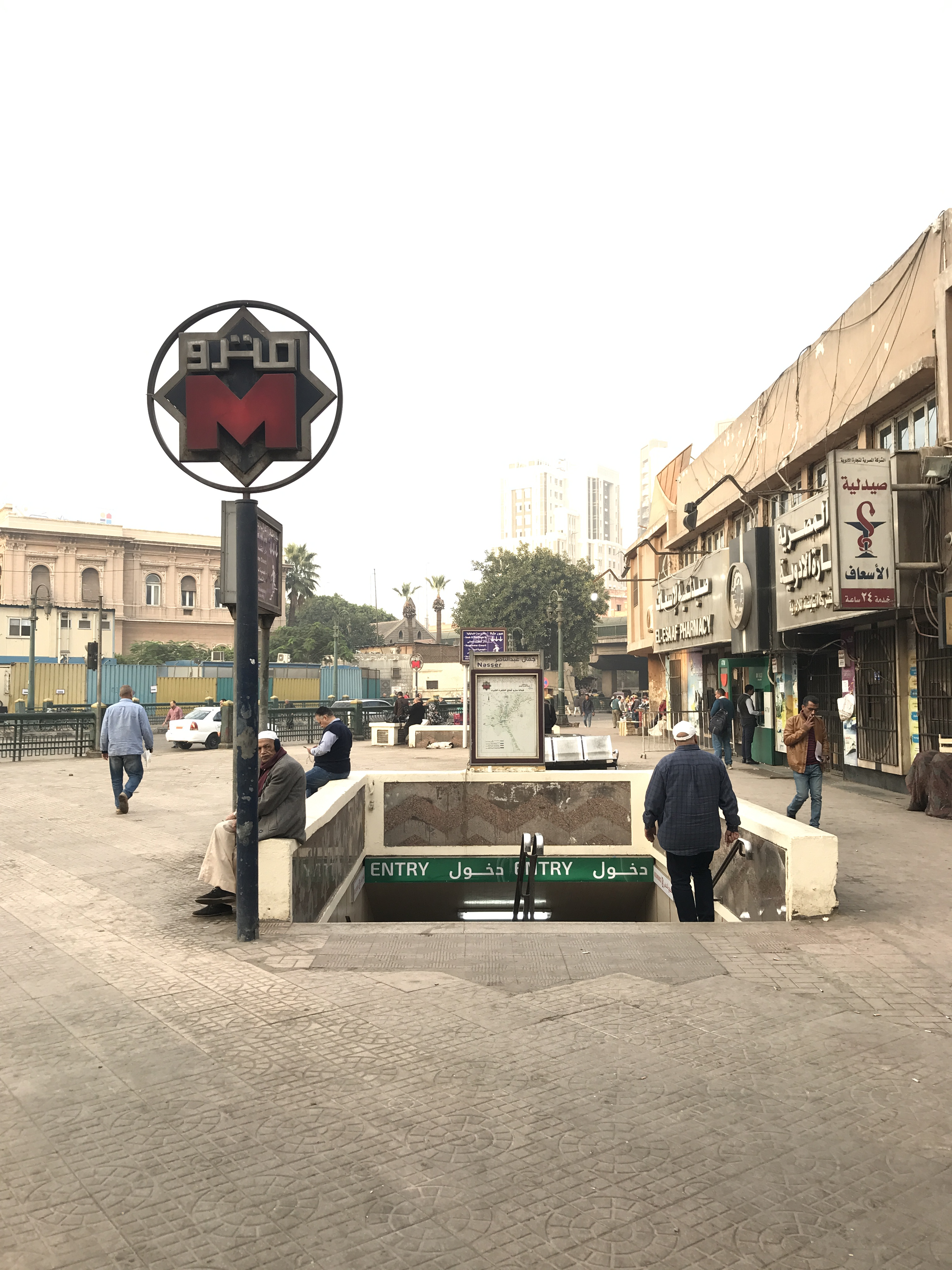
- Entrance to Nasser station

General information
- Location: Cairo Governorate; Egypt
- Lines: Line 1; Line 3

Construction
- Accessible: Yes (Line 3 only)

Services
Preceding station	Cairo Metro	Following station
Orabi towards New El Marg	Line 1	Sadat towards Helwan
Preceding station	Cairo Metro	Following station
Maspero towards Rod El Farag Corridor or Cairo University	Line 3	Attaba towards Aldy Mansour
Location

Nasser (Arabic: محطة جمال عبد الناصر) is a station in Cairo Metro, that serves as an interchange station between Line 1 and Line 3 of the system. It is located in Downtown Cairo, at the intersection of 26th of July and Ramses streets. The station was initially opened in 1987 as part of the original line. It is named after Egypt’s former President Gamal Abdel Nasser

The Line 3 station was opened in October 2022. It was acclaimed to be one of the largest station on the line, having four levels below ground. Access to the station is provided by multiple stairs and escalators, and two elevators from the fare area. The station was constructed under the 26 July street, which was partially closed for five years to allow for construction work of the station.
