= El-Marg station =

Metro station in Cairo, Egypt

El-Marg محطة المرج

General information
- Location: Egypt
- Coordinates: 30°09′07.7″N 31°20′08.0″E
- System: Cairo Metro Rapid transit
- Operator: Cairo Metro - The Egyptian Co. for Metro Management & Operation
- Line: Line 1
- Platforms: 2 side platforms (Helwan-El Marg)
- Tracks: 2

Construction
- Structure type: At-grade

History
- Opened: 5 April 1989
- Electrified: Overhead line

Services
Preceding station	Cairo Metro	Following station
New El Marg Terminus	Line 1	Ezbet El-Nakhl towards Helwan
Location

El-Marg station (Arabic: محطة المرج) is a station on the Cairo Metro that is located at El-Marg district in north east Cairo, Egypt. It is on Line 1 and is an above ground station.

== History ==
El-Marg station was inaugurated on 5 April 1989 as part of Phase 2 of Line 1.

== See also ==
- Cairo Metro
- Cairo Metro Line 1
- List of Cairo Metro stations
