= El-Bohy station =

Metro station in Giza

Coordinates: 30.0820°N 31.2105°E

El-Bohy البوهي

General information
- Location: Giza Governorate; Egypt
- System: Cairo Metro station
- Line: Cairo Metro Line 3
- Distance: 900 m (3,000 ft) from Imbaba, 800 m (2,600 ft) from El-Qawmia
- Platforms: 2 side platforms
- Tracks: 2

Construction
- Structure type: Elevated
- Accessible: Yes

History
- Opened: 1 January 2024
Location

El-Bohy is a station in Line 3 of Cairo Metro that opened on 1 January 2024 as part of Phase 3B of the line. The station is located above El-Bohy street. It is an elevated station with access provided by stairs, escalators, and elevators.
