= Hadayek El Maadi station =

Metro station in Cairo

Hadayek El Maadi حدائق المعادي

General information
- Location: Cairo Governorate; Egypt
- Coordinates: 29°58′12.36″N 31°15′2.41″E
- System: Cairo Metro station
- Line: Line 1
- Platforms: 2 side platforms
- Tracks: 2

Construction
- Structure type: At-grade

Services
Preceding station	Cairo Metro	Following station
Dar El Salam towards New El Marg	Line 1	Maadi towards Helwan
Location

Hadayek El Maadi is a station in Cairo Metro, served by Line 1 of the system. The station is located in the Hadayek El Maadi neighborhood in Southern Cairo.

The station was a site of track crossings by pedestrians which could lead to death, especially after the stair in the station was removed and the outer stair was rejected by the local communities. As a result, a renovation of the station started in 2010 at the cost of LE 27 million. It was stated that the renovation would take fourteen months to complete, by which escalators and accessibility features would be installed at the station. The renovation would be complete in 2014.
