= Boulak El Dakrour station =

Metro station in Giza

Coordinates: 30.0376°N 31.1955°E

Boulak El Dakrour بولاق الدكرور
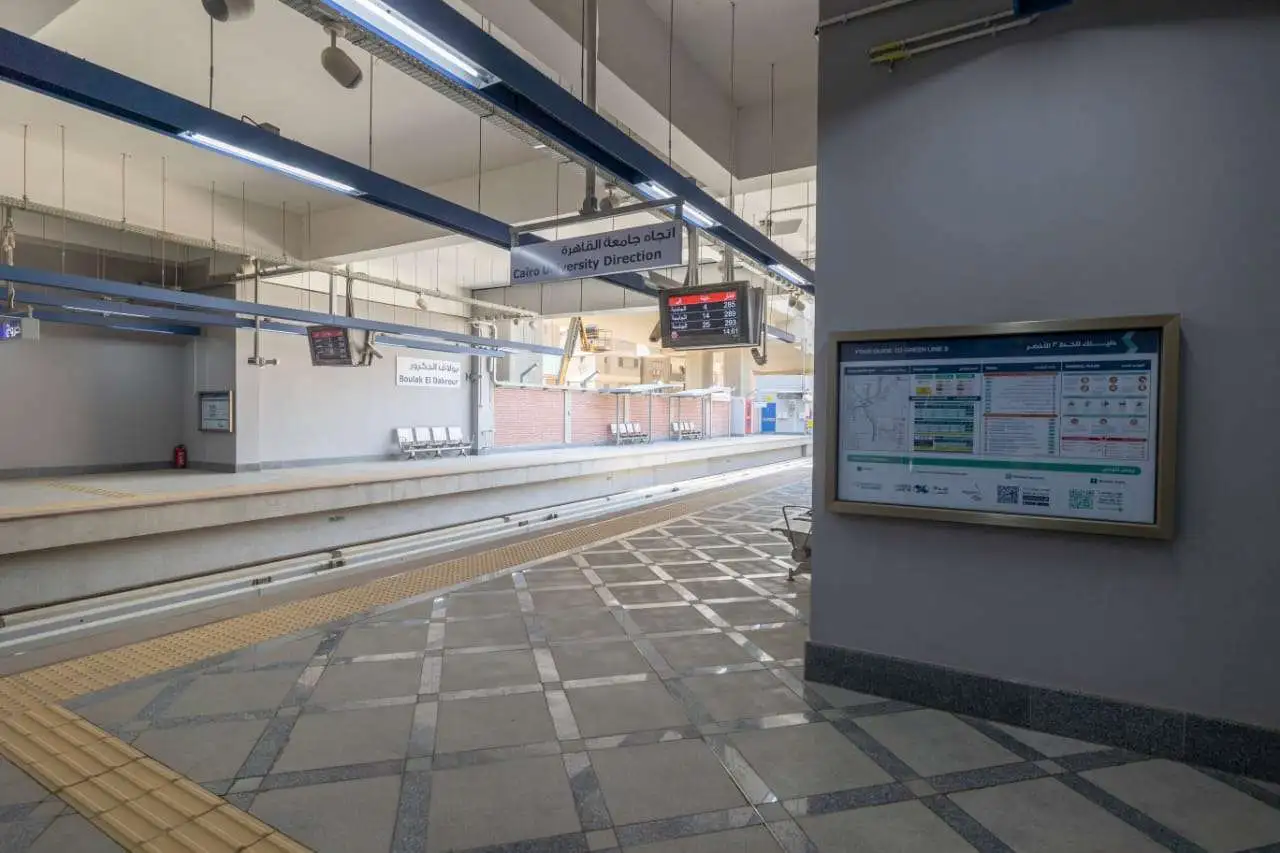

General information
- Location: Giza Governorate; Egypt
- System: Cairo Metro station
- Line: Cairo Metro Line 3
- Platforms: 2 side platforms
- Tracks: 2

Construction
- Structure type: At-grade
- Accessible: Yes

History
- Opened: 15 May 2024; 2 years ago
Location

Boulak El Dakrour is a station in the Cairo University branch of Cairo Metro Line 3 that was opened on 15 May 2024 as part of Phase 3C of the line. It is an at-grade station located right next to the railway line, in Boulak El Dakrour district in Giza. The station has entrances in both sides supported by escalators and elevators. It is intended to reduce the congestion at the nearby Al Bohoth station, served by Line 2. It also serves as a connection to a nearby bus stop.
