= Cairo Metro Line 2 =

Line 2 Shubra Al Khaimah - El Mounib

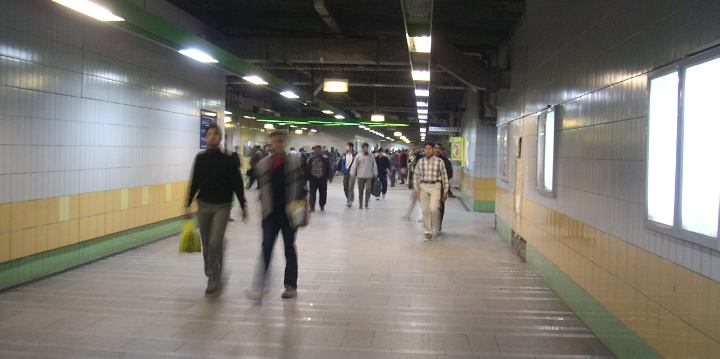
- Attaba station

Overview
- Native name: الخط الثاني
- Status: Operational
- Owner: National Authority for Tunnels (Egyptian state)
- Locale: Cairo
- Termini: Shubra Al Khaimah; El Mounib
- Stations: 20

Service
- Type: Rapid transit
- System: Cairo Metro
- Operator(s): Cairo Metro - The Egyptian Co. for Metro Management & Operation
- Daily ridership: 895,000 (FY 2009/2010)

History
- Opened: 1996; 30 years ago
- Last extension: 2005

Technical
- Line length: 21.6 km (13.42162 mi)
- Character: Mixed; 3 Stations Elevated; 5 Stations At-grade; 12 Stations Underground
- Track gauge: 1,435 mm (4 ft 8 1/2 in)
- Electrification: Third rail, 750 V DC
- Operating speed: 100 km/h (62 mph)

Cairo Metro Line 2 is the second line of the Cairo Metro in Cairo, Egypt.

== History ==
Cairo's metro network was greatly expanded in the mid-1990s with the building of Line 2 (red), from Shubra Al Khaimah to Cairo University, with an extension to Giza.

It is the first line in history to have a tunnel going under the Nile. The tunnel under the Nile is 8.35 m (27 ft 5 in) in internal diameter and was constructed using two Herenknecht bentonite slurry shield TBMs, which are 9.43 m (30 ft 11 in) in diameter. Extending 21.5 kilometres (13 mi) with 20 stations, it is sometimes called the "Japanese-Built Line". It is mostly in bored tunnel, with two exceptions: a short section at the northern end approaching Shubra El-Kheima which is elevated, and a section just south of this by cut-and-cover. The main difference between Lines 1 and 2 is that Line 1 uses an overhead line while Line 2 uses the third-rail system. The construction of the line was finished in October 2000 and was later extended to El Mounib. The communication for line 2 was provided by Alcatel in 2005.

Total project cost was 761 million euros.

After the 2011 Egyptian revolution, the station "Mubarak" has been renamed and is now called "Al-Shohadaa" (Arabic for "martyrs").

- October 1996 Shobra - Mubarak (now:"Al-Shohadaa"), 8 kilometres (5 mi)
- Sept 1998: Mubarak (now:"Al-Shohadaa") - Sadat, 3 kilometres (2 mi)
- April 19, 1999: Sadat - Cairo University, 5.5 kilometres (3 mi) (including crossing of the Nile)
- October 8, 2000: Cairo University - Giza Suburban 2.7 kilometres (2 mi)
- January 17, 2005: Omm el Misryeen - Monib 2.5 kilometres (2 mi)

== Connections ==
=== To other Metro lines ===
Line 2 connects to Line 1 at Al-Shohadaa and Sadat stations and with Line 3 at Cairo University and Attaba stations.

=== To other forms of transit ===
Because the line often run parallelly with the railway, a few stations are near to the train stations, including:

- Shohadaa station is immediately next to Ramses Station, providing access to Egyptian National Railways long-haul and short-haul domestic passenger service.
- Shubra El-Kheima station is next to the train station of the same name.
- Giza station is located next to the train station of the same name.

Cairo Transport Authority buses and private microbus services are also nearby.

Access to Cairo International Airport is expected via transfer to Line 3 upon completion of Phase 4 in early 2020.

== See also ==
- List of Cairo Metro stations
