= Sudan station =

Metro station in Giza, Egypt

Coordinates: 30.0698°N 31.2053°E

Sudan السودان

General information
- Location: Giza Governorate; Egypt
- Line: Cairo Metro Line 3
- Platforms: 2 side platforms
- Tracks: 2

Construction
- Accessible: Yes

History
- Opened: 1 January 2024
Location

Sudan is a station in Line 3 of Cairo Metro that opened as part of Phase 3 of the line on 1 January 2024. It is located in front of the Giza Elementary Court in Sudan street, in the Agouza district in Giza. It consists of three underground levels, with a total of 17 escalators, 13 stairs, and three elevators from the platforms to the street. It has a total area of 3,542 square metres (38,130 sq ft).
