= El-Qawmia station =

Metro station in Giza, Egypt

Coordinates: 30.0932°N 31.2090°E

El-Qawmia القومية

General information
- Location: Giza Governorate; Egypt
- System: Cairo Metro station
- Line: Cairo Metro Line 3
- Distance: 1.5 km (0.93 mi) from El-Bohy station, ~900 m (3,000 ft) from Ring Road station
- Platforms: 2 side platforms
- Tracks: 2

Construction
- Structure type: Elevated
- Accessible: Yes

History
- Opened: 1 January 2024
Location

El-Qawmia is a station in Line 3 of Cairo Metro that was opened on 1 January 2024 as part of Phase 3B of the line. It is located above the El-Qawmia street, with access to the station provided by stairs, escalators and elevators.
