= Gamat El Dowal station =

Metro station in Giza

Coordinates: 30.0510°N 31.1997°E

Gamat El Dowal جامعة الدول

General information
- Location: Giza Governorate; Egypt
- System: Cairo Metro station
- Line: Cairo Metro Line 3
- Platforms: 2 side platforms
- Tracks: 2

Construction
- Structure type: Underground
- Accessible: Yes

History
- Opened: 15 May 2024
Location

Gamat El Dowal is a station in the Cairo University branch of Cairo Metro Line 3 that opened on 15 May 2024 as part of Phase 3C of the line. It is an underground station located beneath the street of the same name and serves the surrounding streets and areas. Access to the station is provided by stairs, escalators, and elevators.
