= Imbaba station =

Metro station in Giza

Coordinates: 30.0759°N 31.2075°E

Imbaba إمبابة

General information
- Location: Giza Governorate; Egypt
- System: Cairo Metro station
- Line: Cairo Metro Line 3
- Platforms: 2 side platforms
- Tracks: 2

Construction
- Structure type: Elevated
- Accessible: Yes

History
- Opened: 1 January 2024
Location

Imbaba is a station in the Rod El Farag Corridor branch of Cairo Metro Line 3 that was opened on 1 January 2024 as part of Phase 3B of the line. It is located in the dense neighborhood of Imbaba and serves nearby streets and areas. It is an elevated station that is located right next to railway tracks. Access to the station is provided by escalators, elevators and ramps.

Construction of the station started in 2020, where the construction workers described the station "difficult" to construct due to the presence of the railway tracks between Ramses station and Upper Egypt railway station.
