= Tawfikia station =

Metro station in Giza

Coordinates: 30.0651°N 31.2022°E

Tawfikia التوفيقية

General information
- Location: Giza Governorate; Egypt
- System: Cairo Metro station
- Line: Cairo Metro Line 3
- Platforms: 2 side platforms
- Tracks: 2

Construction
- Structure type: Underground
- Accessible: Yes

History
- Opened: 15 May 2024
Location

Tawfikia is a station in the Cairo University branch of Cairo Metro Line 3, which was opened on 15 May 2024 as part of Phase 3C of the line. It is located in the intersection between El-Rashid and Ahmed Oraby streets in the Mohandiseen district in Giza. It is intended to serve a nearby large railway station. It is an underground station with access to the platforms provided by stairs, elevators and escalators.
