= Transport in Cairo =

Transport systems in Cairo, Egypt

Transport in Cairo comprises an extensive road network, rail system, subway system and maritime services for the more than 15.2 million inhabitants of the city. Cairo is the hub of almost the entire Egyptian transport network.

== Transport today ==
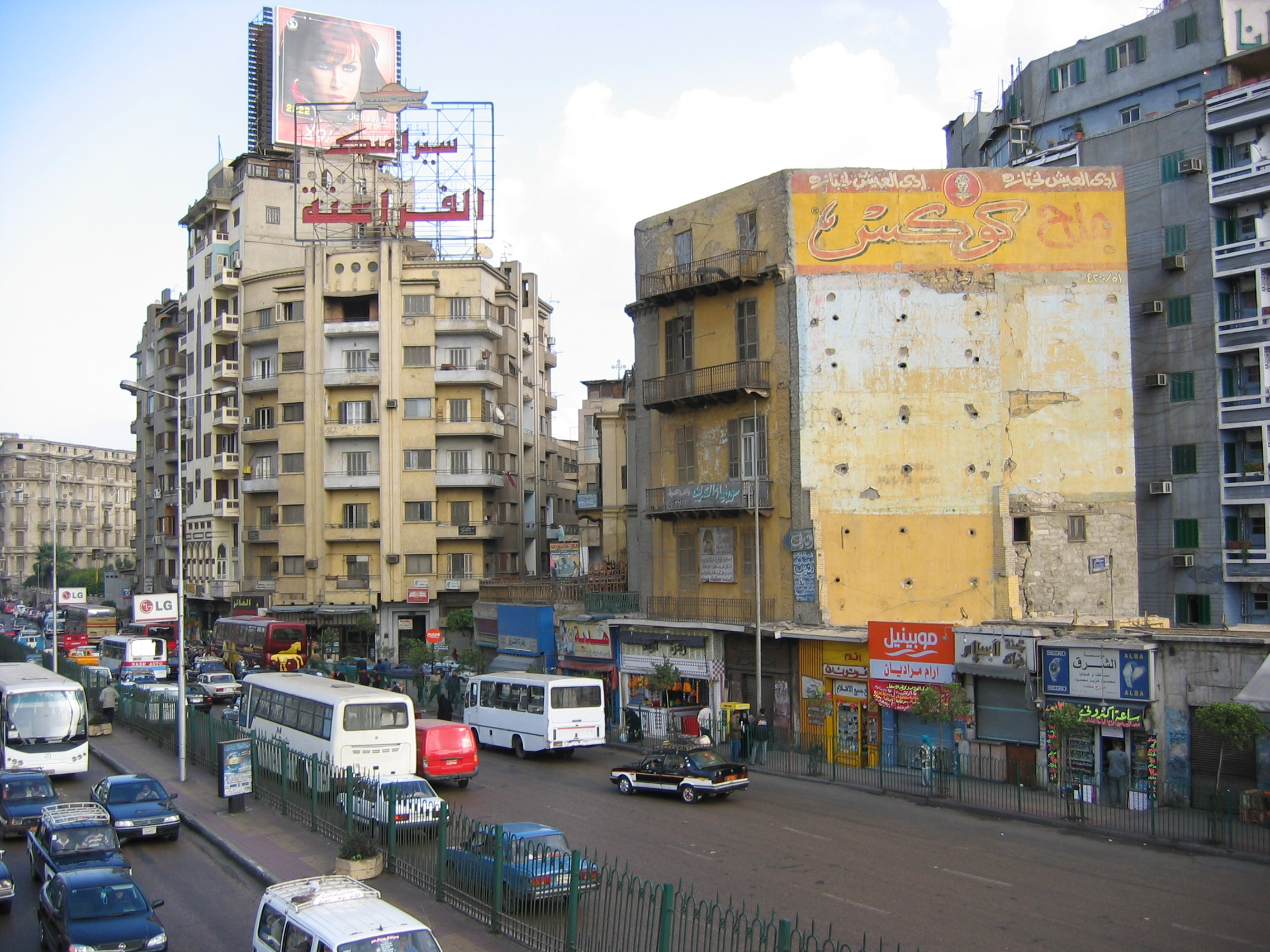
Part of the city centre road system in Cairo

=== Road system ===
An extensive road network connects Cairo with other Egyptian cities and villages. There is a ring road that surrounds the outskirts of the city, with exits that reach to almost every Cairo district. There are flyovers and bridges such as the Sixth of October Bridge, designed to allow fast and efficient means of transport from one side of the city to the other; in practice, however, Cairo traffic is known to be overwhelming and overcrowded, with traffic jams frequently increasing travel time far beyond the theoretical speed.

During the period between 2014 and 2020, many roads were expanded and upgraded, such as the El Moshir Tantawy Axis which connects New Cairo to other neighborhoods in Eastern and Central Cairo, and the Cairo-Suez Road which connects Cairo to El Rehab, Madinaty, El Shorouk, Badr and the New Administrative Capital. The ring road is also undergoing an expansion as of September 2020, which aims to increase the number of lanes to seven or eight, instead of three or four.

Many neighborhoods in Cairo have unplanned buildings, which resulted in an increasing population density in these areas, so neighborhoods such as Heliopolis and Nasr City had congested streets almost daily and at all times. In late 2019, the government decided to tackle this problem by constructing a large number of overpasses inside these neighborhoods in order to remove intersections and u-turns that resulted in congestion, more than 8 overpasses were constructed in Heliopolis, and over 12 overpasses were built in Nasr City, with Mostafa El Nahas Street alone (a major axis in Nasr City) having four of them. These structures did fulfill their intended purpose, which was to eliminate traffic congestion in these areas, but they received criticism due to many reasons, one of which was the removal of many green spaces in Heliopolis, and the danger they posed for pedestrians crossing the streets (also known as jaywalking).

=== Bus system ===
There are two types of buses in Cairo, those run by the Cairo Transport Authority, and those run by private companies, with the latter using smaller minibuses. Bus lines are spread all over the Greater Cairo area, and are considered the main mean of transport for many Cairenes. The tickets for the CTA buses cost anywhere from E£4 to E£15, depending on the type of bus itself, and whether it's air conditioned or not, while tickets for buses run by private companies cost E£15−30 depending on the company and the route. The ticket costs were considerably lower, but due to the devaluation of the Egyptian pound back in 2016, and the government's decision to gradually remove subsidies (which affected gas prices), the prices were increased. In recent years, other bus services such as Uber Bus, Careem bus and Swvl increased in popularity.

=== Air ===
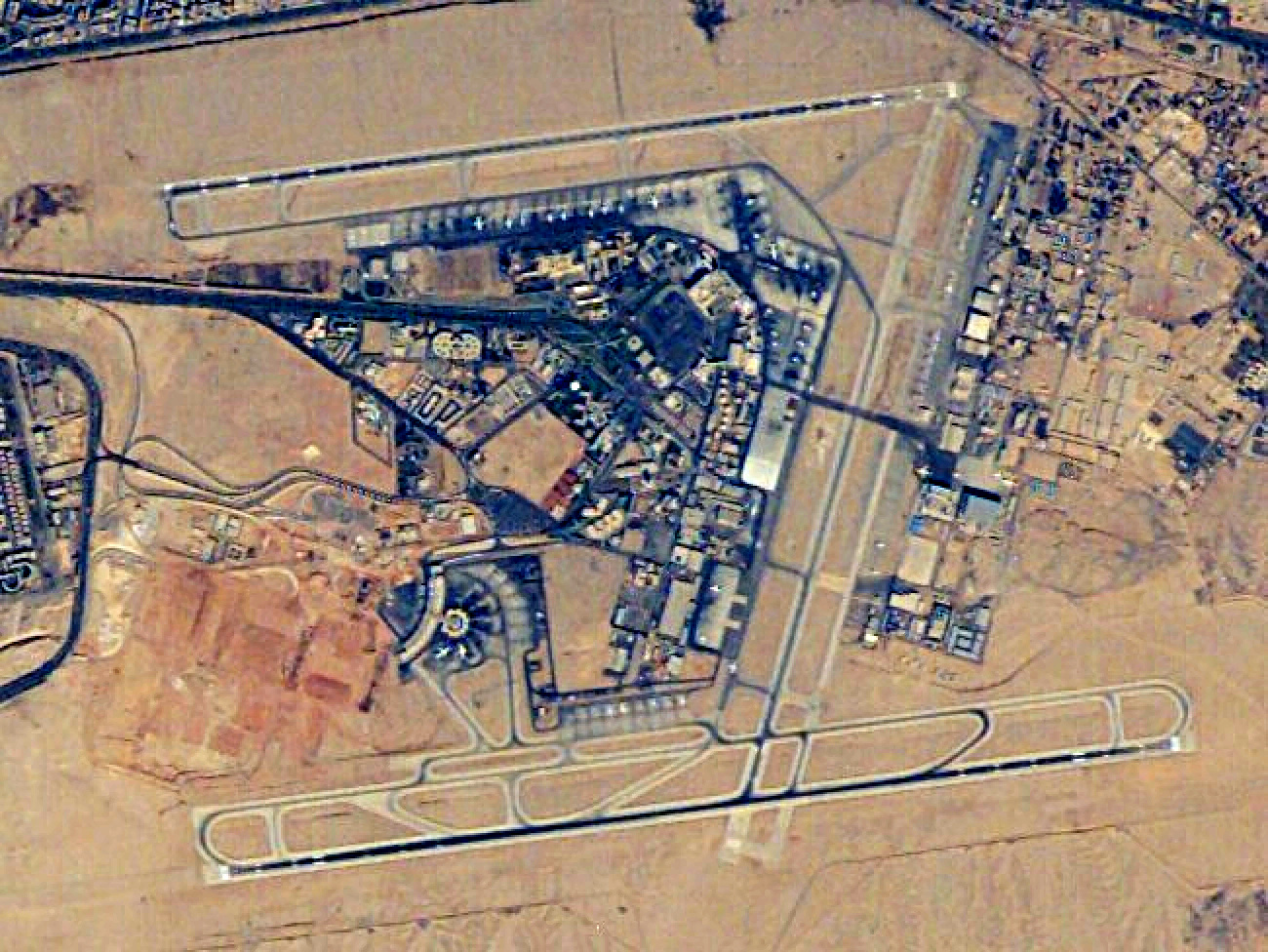
Satellite shot of Cairo International Airport.

The largest airport in Egypt, Cairo International Airport, is located near in the Heliopolis district and is accessible by car, taxi and bus. The third line of the Cairo Metro, opened in 2012, was originally planned to reach the Airport, but those plans were cancelled in mid-2020 in place of a future shuttle bus system that runs directly from Adly Mansour Station to the Airport. However, some current maps still shows the line being connected to it. The Cairo Airport Shuttle Bus also operates all over Cairo for trips to or from the airport.

Cairo International Airport is the busiest airport in Egypt and the primary hub for Star Alliance member and flag carrier EgyptAir. The airport is located to the north-east of the city around 15 km from the business area of the city. The airport is administered by the Egyptian Holding Company for Airports and Air Navigation (EHCAAN), which controls four companies including: Cairo Airport Co., Egyptian Airports Co., National Air Navigation Services and Aviation Information Technology and the Cairo Airport Authority (CAA), which is the regulatory body.

Cairo International is the second busiest airport in Africa after Johannesburg International Airport in South Africa. Cairo Airport handles about 3,400 daily flights, more than 12,100 weekly flights, and about 125,000 yearly flights. The airport has three terminals with the third (Terminal 3), which opened in April 2009, houses EgyptAir and its Star Alliance partners. There are also three runways (a fourth runway was opened in early 2009) and a single cargo terminal. Runway 05L/23R is 3,300m long, 05R/23L has a length of 4,000m and 16/34 is 3,180m (all of the runways are 60m wide). The fourth runway, south of the existing airfield is 4,000m by 65m and suitable for the Airbus A380.

With the assimilation of EgyptAir into Star Alliance in July 2008, the airport has the potential to be a major hub with its positioning between Africa, the Middle East and Europe (especially with facilities for the A380).

In 2008, the airport served 14,360,175 passengers (+14.2% vs. 2007) and handled just over 138,000 aircraft movements (+12.4% vs. 2007). According to Airports Council International statistics, of the top 100 airports in the world, CAI reported the highest growth rate of any airport in 2008.

Cairo is also planned to be served by a new airport in the New Administrative Capital, which has been fully constructed but is not yet fully operational.

=== Taxis ===
Cairo is served by its "white taxis" which have been introduced in the early 2010s and aren't run by a company, but rather by individuals. These taxis have plummeted in popularity, due to things such as the drivers not turning on their meters and instead demanding a fare which is usually considerably inflated, and other problems such as the lack of air-conditioning. The main reason, however, is the introduction of applications like Uber, which have become the main option instead of taxis. This has been met by protests from cab drivers, going as far as demanding a ban of these services.

=== Cairo Metro ===
The Cairo Metro is the first rapid transit system in Greater Cairo, Egypt and the first of only two full-fledged metro systems in Africa and only four in the Arab world. It was opened in 1987 as Line 1 from Helwan to Ramsis square, with a length of 29 kilometres (18.0 mi). As of 2014, the Cairo Metro has 61 stations (mostly At-grade), of which three are transfer stations, with a total length of 77.9 kilometres (48.4 mi). The system consists of three operational lines numbered from 1 to 3. As of 2013, the metro carried nearly 4 million passengers per day. The cost of the Metro was E£1 to go anywhere until 2017, when it rose to E£2 (still heavily subsidized).

The Cairo Metro is run by the National Authority for Tunnels. The lines use standard gauge (1,435 mm (4 ft 8 1/2 in)).

=== Tram ===
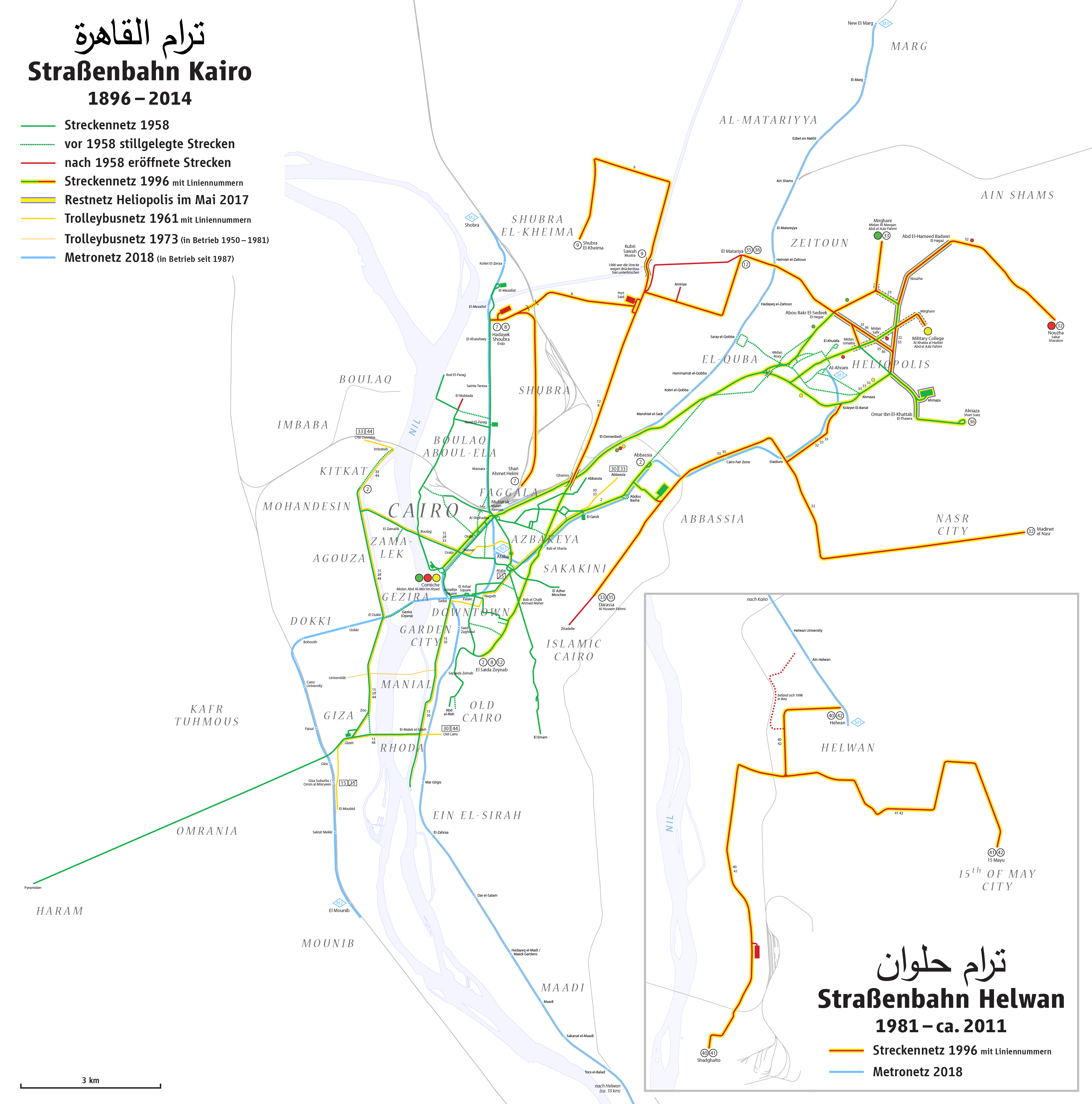
Tramway network

Constructed near the beginning of the 20th century, until 2014, the Cairo tramway network was still used in modern-day Cairo, especially in modern areas, like Heliopolis, Nasr City. During the 1970s government policies favoured making space for cars, resulting in the removal of over half of the 120 km network. Trams were removed entirely from central Cairo but continued to run in Heliopolis and Helwan. However, in 2015, the tramway rails were removed and the streets and side walks became wider. The reason according to the city council is that "it has been rarely used by anyone during the past decade as it is a slow mean of transportation and it has a limited geographical coverage".

=== Limousine service ===
This service uses a luxury sedan or saloon car driven by chauffeur to drive passengers from the airport or other locations to their destination. There are types of limousine services the main one is Airport limousine and the second one to transport people from town to town in Egypt.

=== Train ===
Cairo is extensively connected to other Egyptian cities and villages by rail operated by the Egyptian National Railways. Cairo's main railway station - Ramses Station (Mahattat Ramses) is located on Midan Ramses.

In May 2022, the Egyptian National Authority for Tunnels (NAT) and Siemens Mobility have signed a contract to create the sixth largest high-speed rail system - 2,000 km long - in the world. The Siemens Mobility share of the combined contract is 8.1 billion EUR and includes the initial contract of 2.7 billion EUR for the first line signed September 1, 2021. The high-speed rail network will connect 60 cities throughout the country, with trains that can operate at up to 230 km/h. Approximately 90 percent of Egyptians will have access to this rail system.

The Cairo Light Rail Transit or LRT, inaugurated in June 2022, links Cairo to the 10th of Ramadan City and the New Administrative Capital, providing a connection to several other communities east of Cairo along the way. The LRT's western terminus is at Adly Mansour station, where transfer to the Cairo Metro Line 3 is possible.

=== Nile ferry ===
There's a maritime ferry boat system that crosses the Nile River. Here's an article from 2005 about the Nile Bus system. There is also a brief article, published in Al Ahram 2014 about the Nile Bus system.

=== Monorail ===
In 2015 plans to construct two monorail systems were announced, one linking October City to suburban Giza, a distance of 42 km, and the other linking Nasr City to New Cairo, a distance of 54 km. They will be Egypt's first monorail systems. In May 2019 the contract to build 70 four-car trains was awarded to Bombardier Transportation with assembly to take place at its Derby Litchurch Lane Works in England. Delivery of the trains is expected between 2021 and 2024. The network is to be built by Orascom Construction and Arab Contractors.

== See also ==
- Transport in Egypt
