= Heliopolis station =

Metro station in Cairo, Egypt

Coordinates: 30.1080°N 31.3382°E

Heliopolis station (Arabic: محطة هليوبوليس) is a station of the Line 3 of the Cairo Metro located under Heliopolis Square in Heliopolis, Cairo. Inaugurated on 20 October 2019 by the National Authority of Tunnels, Minister of Transport Kamel al-Wazir dubbed the station as the largest underground station in the Middle East.

The station was supposed to be opened the same day as the inauguration of the first section of the fourth phase, which also includes three other stations namely Haroun, Alf Maskan and Shams Club. However, the opening was delayed due to ongoing implementations of the line as a result of the lateness of receiving its location from Cairo Governorate. On 23 August 2019, the implementation of the station was complete.

== Station layout ==
The station is located below Heliopolis square, which is a major square in the district. Having an area of 10,000 square meters, it is considered as the largest station in the region of its kind. The station has a length of 225 meters and a width of 22 meters, and is 28 meters deep from the surface. It was stated that 5,000 square meters would be repurposed for commercial use.

Eight staircases, six escalators, and two elevators provide access to the station from street level, and a further ten staircases, eleven escalators, and two lifts provide access from the ticket window level to the platforms. As with all other stations on the line, the station is air-conditioned. It also features ticket dispensing machines that aims to reduce existing lines at ticket windows.
