= Maspero station =

Metro station in Cairo

Coordinates: 30.0555°N 31.2322°E

Maspero ماسبيرو

General information
- Location: Cairo Governorate; Egypt
- System: Cairo Metro station
- Line: Cairo Metro Line 3
- Platforms: 2 side platforms
- Tracks: 2

Construction
- Structure type: Underground
- Parking: Yes
- Accessible: Yes

History
- Opened: 5 October 2022
Location

Maspero is a station in Cairo Metro Line 3 that was opened on 5 October 2022 as part of Phase 3A of the line. It serves nearby areas including the Maspero Triangle project, Maspero television building, the building of the Ministry of Foreign Affairs, and the Nile Corniche. It is an underground station with access provided by stairs, escalators and elevators/ramps. The station also has a parking space.

In 2020, it was confirmed that there would be a mall above the station as part of the phase 3A.
