= Wadi El Nile station =

Metro station in Giza

Coordinates: 30.0584°N 31.2010°E

Wadi El Nile وادي النيل

General information
- Location: Giza Governorate; Egypt
- System: Cairo Metro station
- Line: Cairo Metro Line 3
- Platforms: 2 side platforms
- Tracks: 2

Construction
- Structure type: Underground
- Accessible: Yes

History
- Opened: 15 May 2024
Location

Wadi El Nile is a station in the Cairo University branch of Cairo Metro Line 3 that opened on 15 May 2024 as part of Phase 3C of the line. It will be the transfer point to the western Cairo Monorail line. It is an underground station with access provided by stairs, escalators and elevators.
