= Ring Road station =

Metro station in Giza, Egypt

Coordinates: 30.0964°N 31.1996°E

Ring Road الطريق الدائري

General information
- Location: Giza Governorate; Egypt
- Line(s): Cairo Metro Line 3
- Distance: 800 m (2,600 ft) from El-Qawmia station, 1,597 m (5,240 ft) from Rod El Farag Corridor station
- Platforms: 2 side platforms
- Tracks: 2

Construction
- Accessible: Yes

History
- Opened: 1 January 2024

Ring Road is a station in Line 3 of Cairo Metro, that was opened as part of Phase 3B of the line on 1 January 2024 after construction began in late 2018. It is located above the Ring Road, spanning a government-owned area of 4,560 square metres (49,100 sq ft), with a length of 144 metres (472 ft). The height above the Ring Road is 6.40 metres (21.0 ft), while the height above El-Qawmia street varies from 13 to 15 metres. Entrance is provided by 4 entrances.

The station has four levels from the street to the platforms, with access provided by stairs, escalators, elevators and pathways. There will also be a direct connection with the bus rapid transit through the platforms.
