= Ramses Station =

Railway station in Egypt

Coordinates: 30°03′49″N 31°14′50″E

Cairo Ramses Station
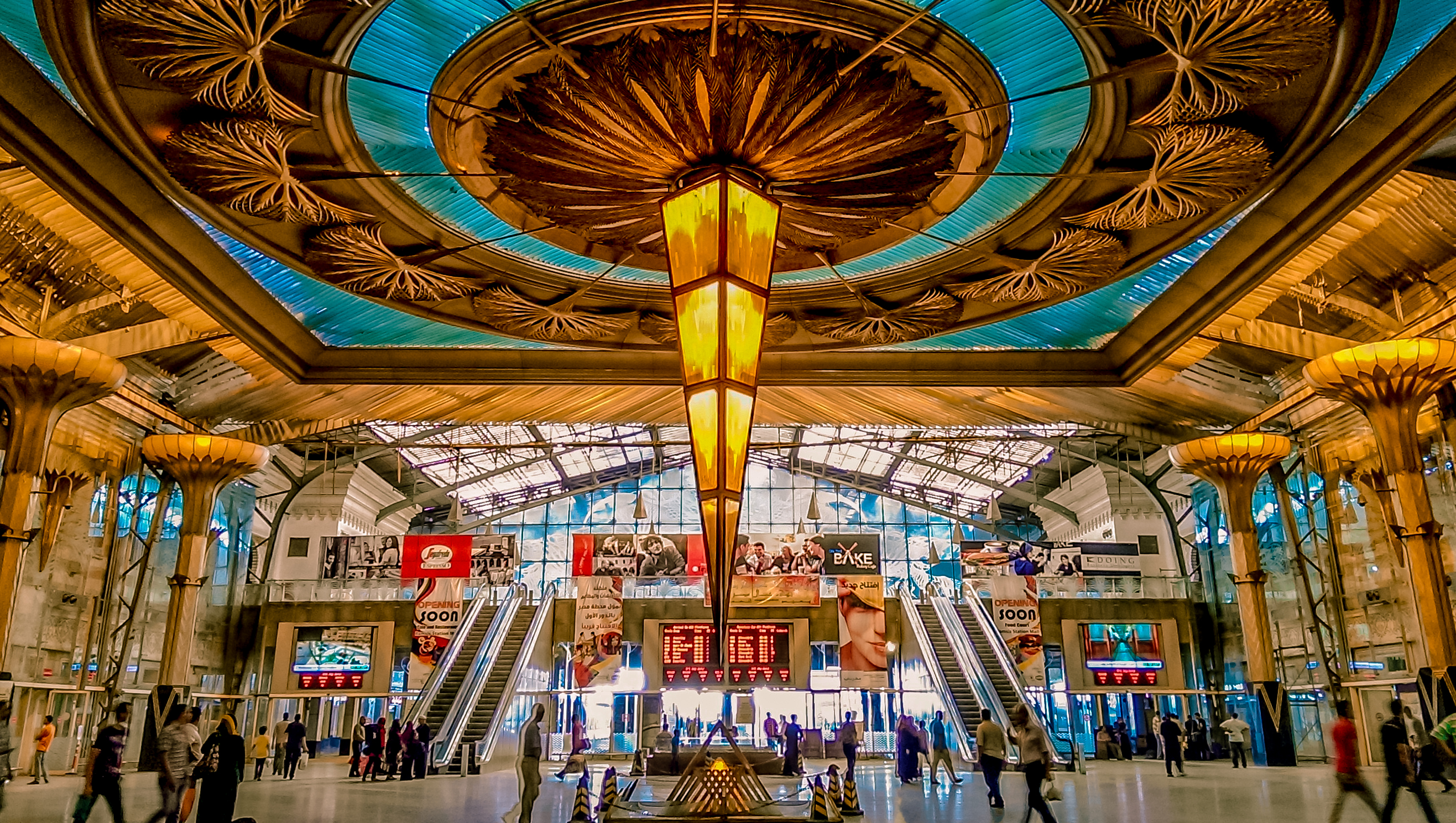
- Inside the station

General information
- Location: Ramses Square, Cairo; Egypt
- System: Egyptian Railways general passenger rail station
- Owner: Egyptian National Railways
- Lines: Cairo - Alexandria; Alexandria - Aswan
- Connections: Cairo Metro (Lines 1 and 2); Cairo Tram; Cairo Transport Authority bus Microbus

Construction
- Structure type: At-grade

History
- Opened: 1856
- Rebuilt: 1892
- Former names: Misr Station

Passengers
- 300,000 daily
Location

Ramses Railway Station (Arabic: محطة رمسيس, romanized: Maḥaṭṭat Ramsīs), also called Misr Station (Arabic: محطة مصر, romanized: Maḥaṭṭat Miṣr), is the main railway station of Cairo, Egypt. The name is derived from the Ancient Egyptian pharaoh Ramses II, whose statue was erected by former Egyptian president Gamal Abdel Nasser on the square there in 1955.

== History ==
The original railway station was built as the terminal of the first rail link from Alexandria to Cairo in 1856. The current building was erected in 1892 and upgraded in 1955. In January 2001, it underwent a major modernisation. In early 2011, following the Egyptian revolution, Ramses station was fully upgraded and air conditioned with new marble flooring across the station and the addition of escalators. Some critics believe that the modernisations were too modern and destroyed much of the building's original style.

Huda Sha'arawi, the Egyptian feminist, famously removed her veil here in 1923.

The classic film Cairo Station (1958) was made at Ramses Station. The film's original title, The Iron Gate (Arabic: باب الحديد Bāb al-Ḥadīd), is a name by which the station is popularly known.

== Structure ==
Outside of the station used to be the statue of Ramses II that was relocated to Giza on 25 August 2006, in preparation for its eventual installation in the Grand Egyptian Museum, which finally occurred in 2018.

The famous sculpture of Mahmoud Mokhtar, Nahdat Misr (Egypt's Awakening), was originally installed outside the station in 1928, but was removed to its current location near Cairo University in the 1950s.

Facilities in the station include a left luggage office, a post office, ATMs, a pharmacy and a tourist information office.

== Train services ==
Ramses Station is served by the vast majority of Egyptian National Railways' intercity passenger services.

== Connecting services ==
The railway station also has a connection to Cairo Metro Lines 1 and 2 via the nearby "Al-Shohadaa/Martyrs" Station. city buses, microbuses and Cairo taxis are also available.

== Incidents ==
On 27 February 2019 a train hit a buffer stop at the station. According to Egypt's Prosecutor General Nabil Sadek, one train driver had left his train to fight with another train driver; thereafter, an unmanned train struck a barrier. The resulting explosion and fire killed at least 25 people and wounded at least 47 people. Some victims' bodies were burned beyond recognition. Egypt's Transportation Minister Hisham Arafat resigned shortly after the incident.

== Gallery ==
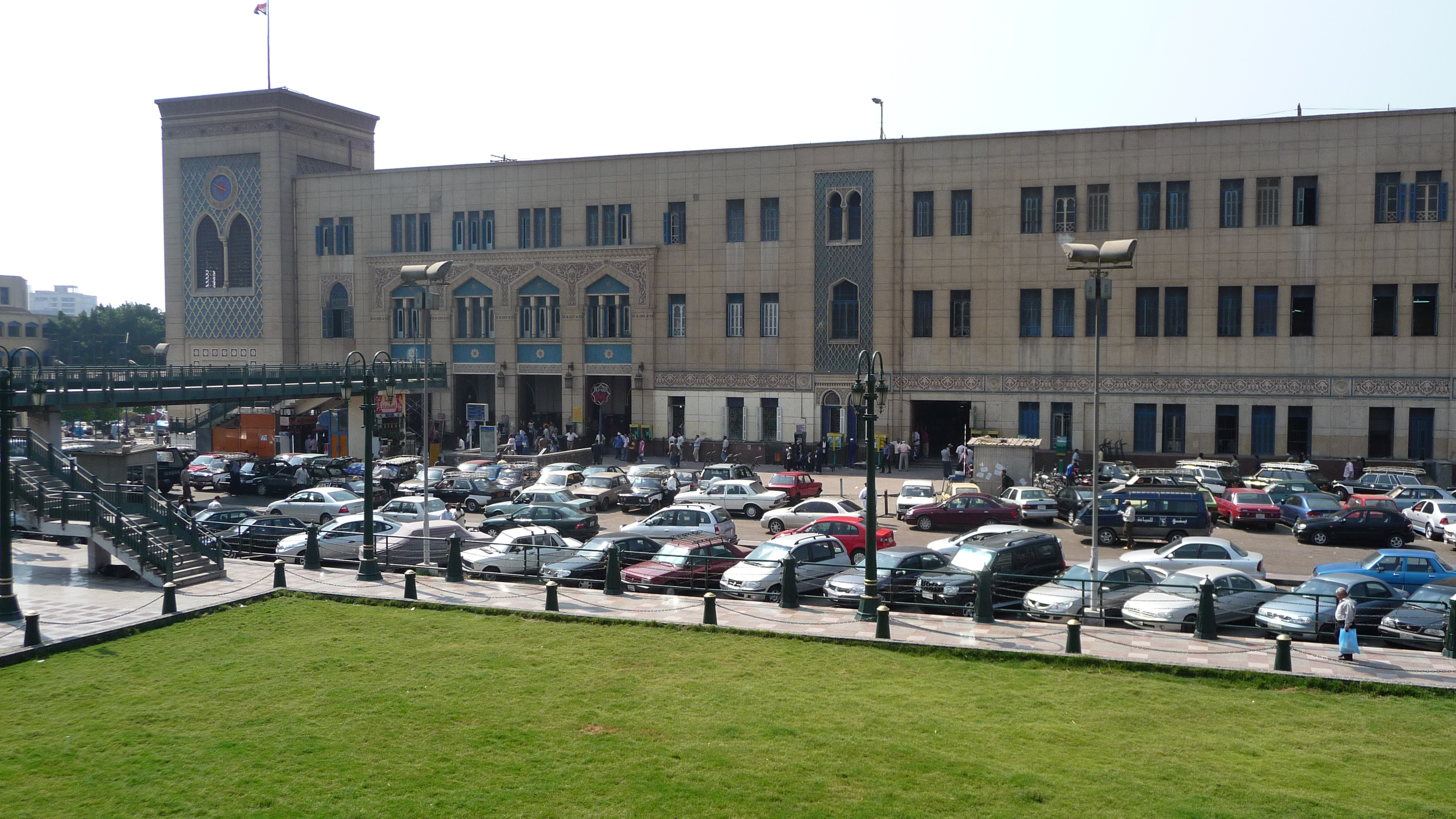
Station building

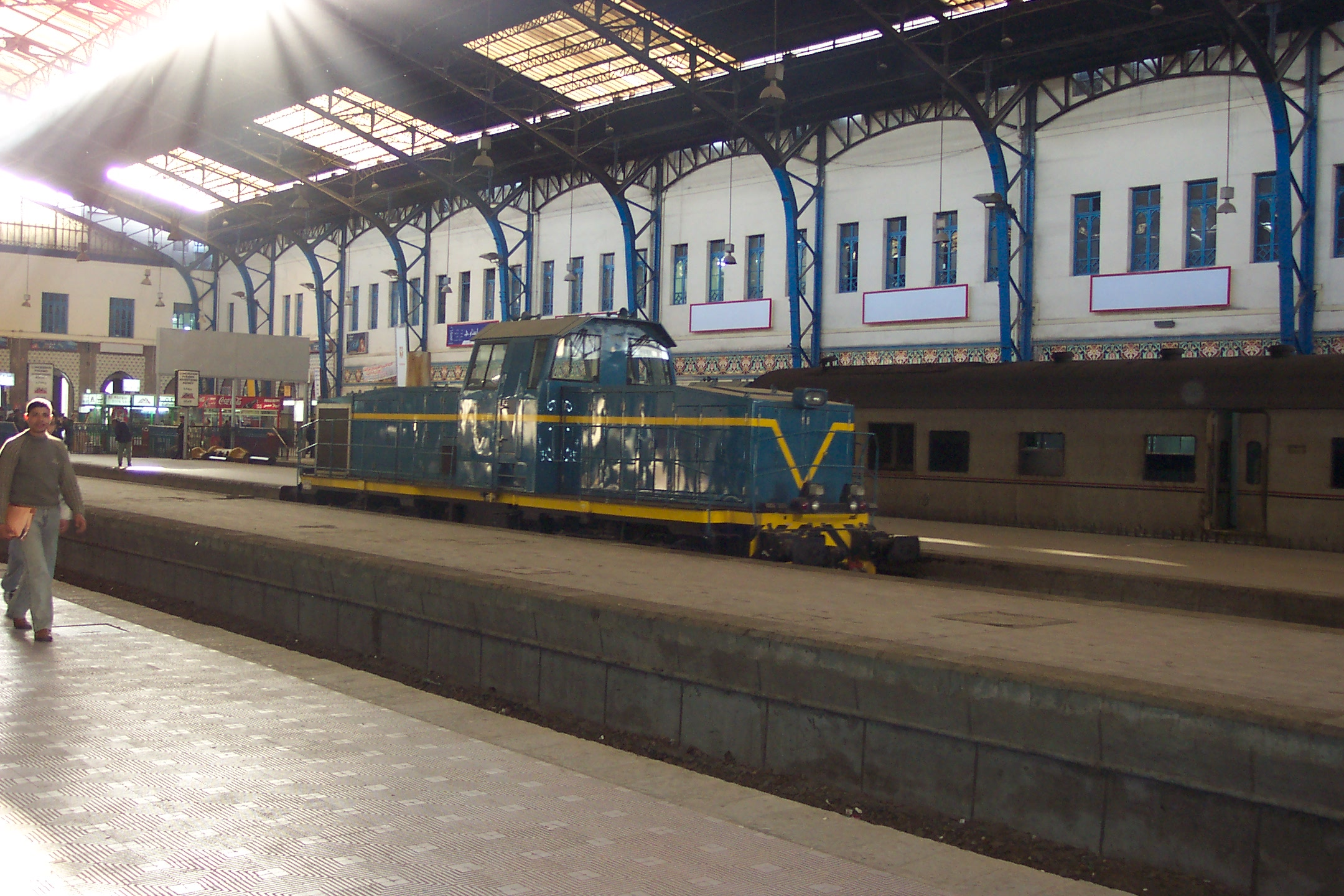
Platforms

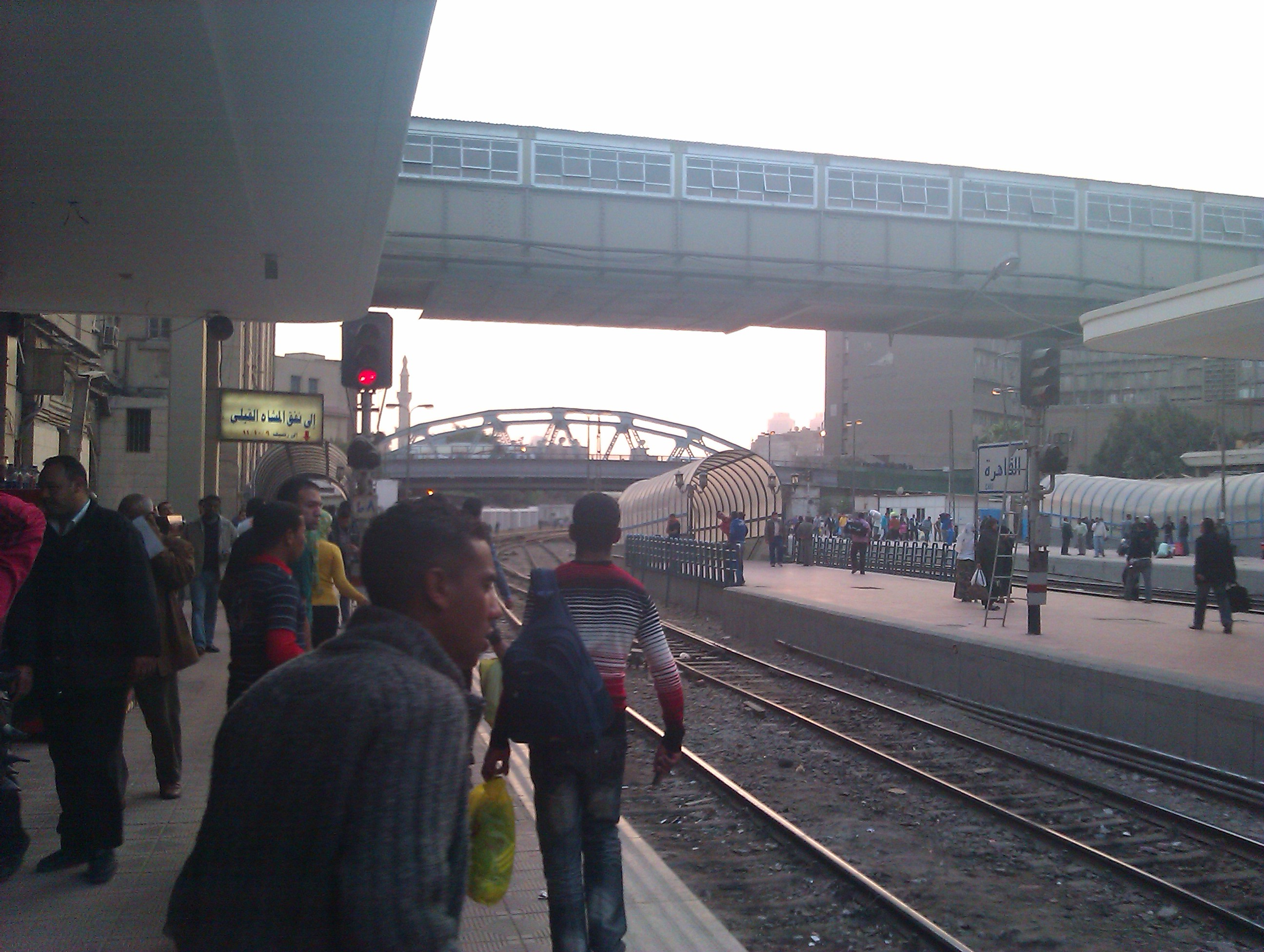
Platforms

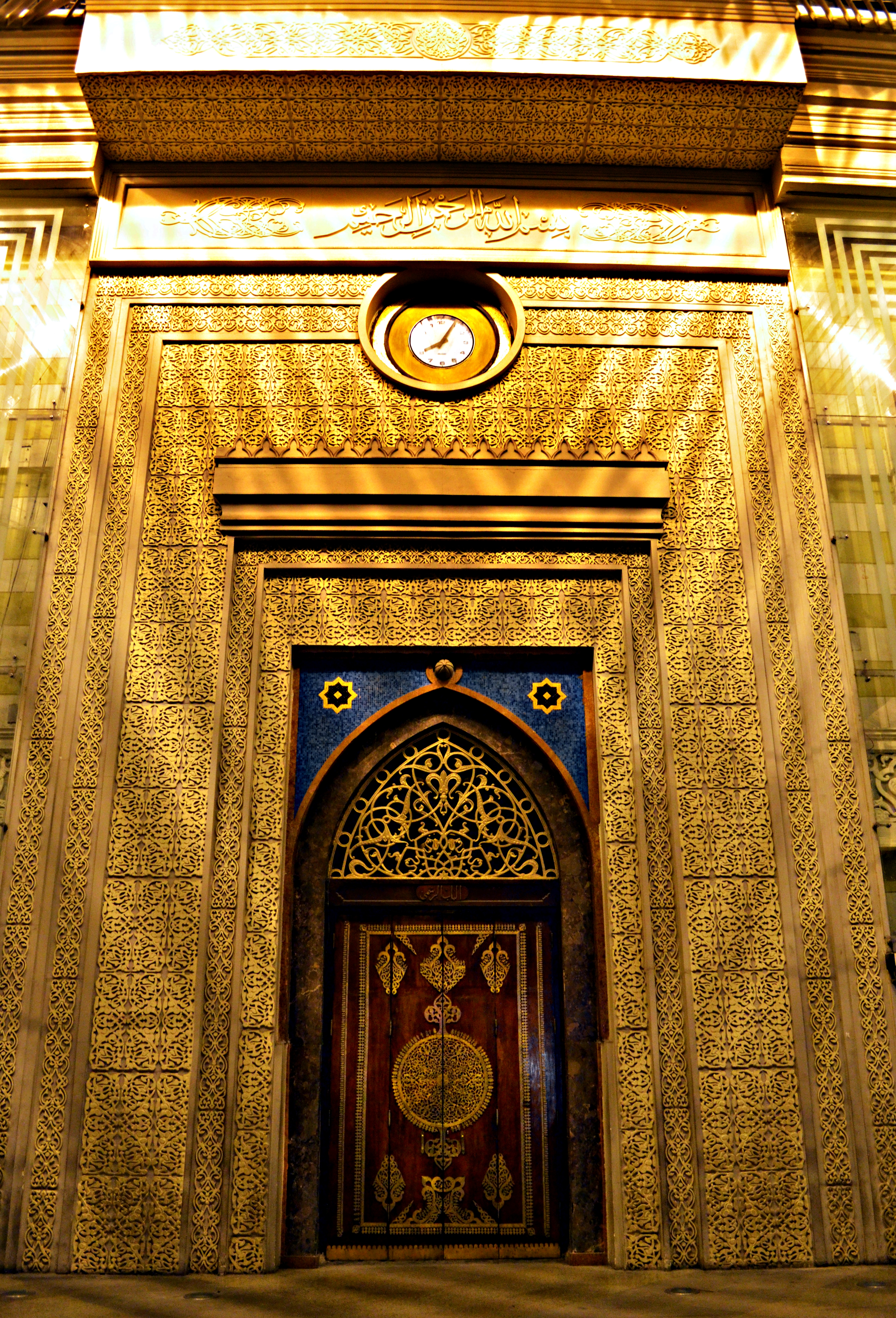
Main station's door

== See also ==
- Egyptian National Railways
