= El Marg =

District of Cairo, Egypt

Coordinates: 30°09′30″N 31°20′01″E

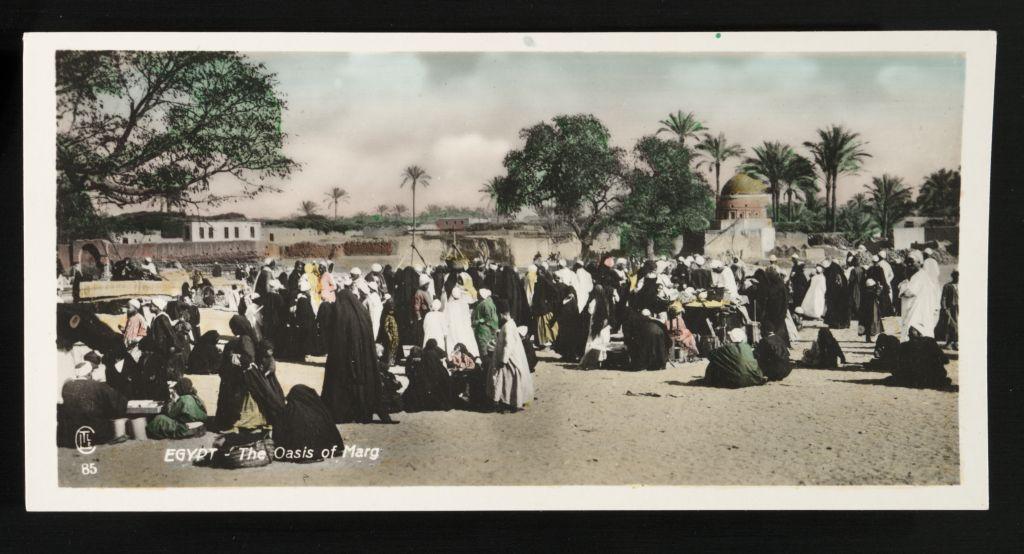
El Marg

El Marg (Arabic: المرج pronounced [elˈmæɾɡ]) is a district in the Eastern Area of Cairo, Egypt, bordering Qalyubia Governorate near Shubra El Kheima. It was separated from the El Salam district (to its south) on 1 April 1994. Its residential area is densely populated. It covers 16.94 square kilometers, with 251,589 people according to a 1996 census, increasing to 507,035 in 2006. In 2017 El-Marg had 798,646 residents making it the most populous district in Cairo.

El Marg was a royal property belonging to the Burji dynasty of the Mamluk Sultanate.

== Administrative subdivisions and population ==
El-Marg is subdivided into seven shiakhas.

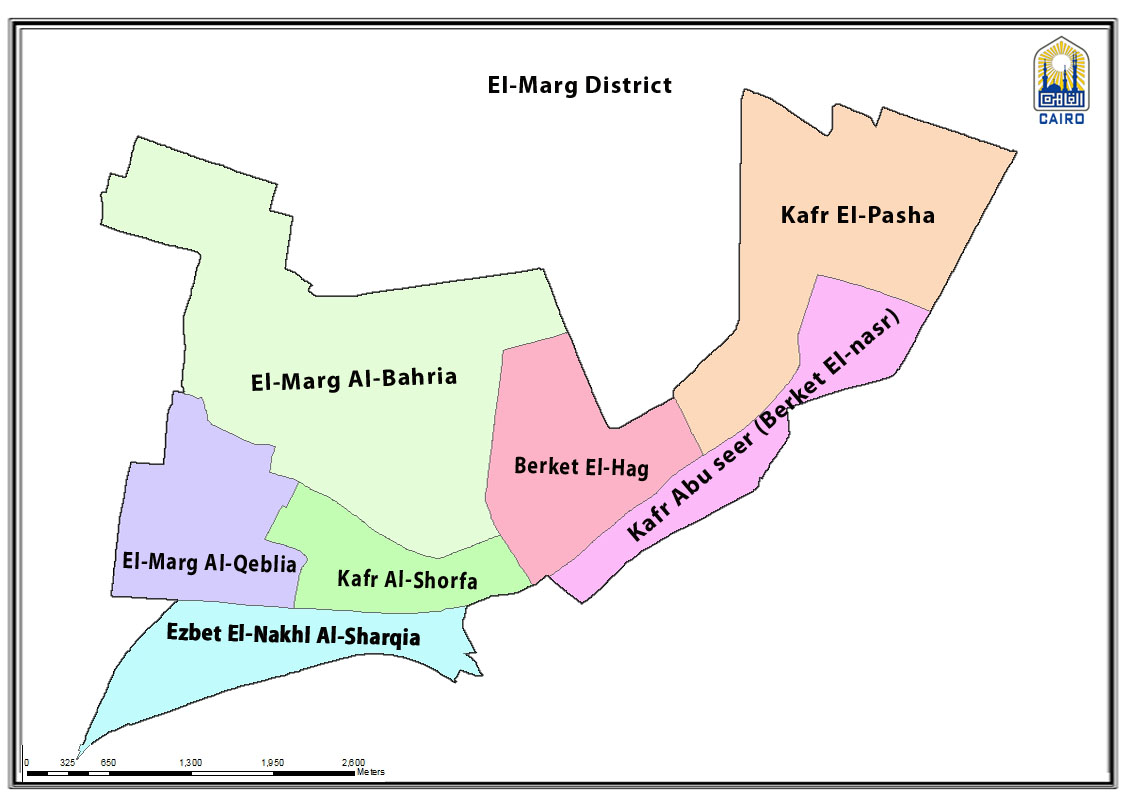
El-Marg district map by shiakha.

In 2017, el-Marg had 798,646 residents across its seven shiakhas.

| Shiakha | Code 2017 | Population |
|---|---|---|
| `Izbat al-Nakhl al-sharqiyya | 013504 | 119,923 |
| Birkat al-Ḥâjj | 013503 | 55,191 |
| Kafr Abû Ṣîr (Birkat al-Naṣr) | 013505 | 38,625 |
| Kafr al-Bâshâ | 013506 | 38,141 |
| Kafr al-Shurafâ | 013507 | 72,915 |
| Marj al-baḥriyya, al- | 013501 | 324,322 |
| Marj al-qibliyya, al- | 013502 | 149,529 |
