= Cairo Metro Line 1 =

Metro system in Cairo, Egypt

Line 1 New Marg - Helwan

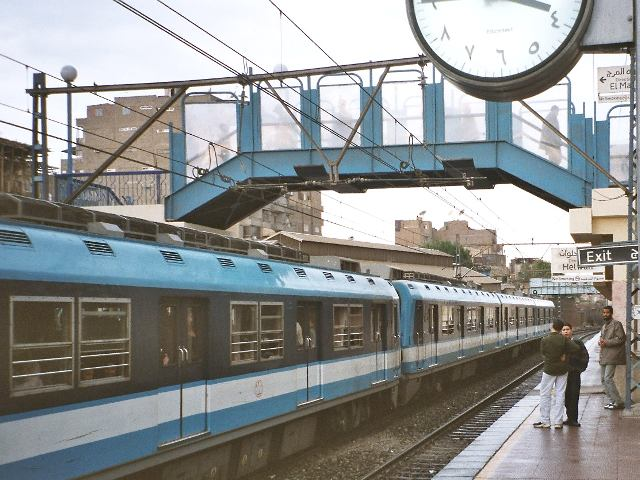
- Mar Girgis station

Overview
- Native name: الخط الاول
- Status: Operational
- Owner: National Authority for Tunnels (Egyptian state)
- Locale: Cairo
- Termini: Helwan; New El Marg
- Stations: 35

Service
- Type: Rapid transit
- System: Cairo Metro
- Operator(s): Cairo Metro - The Egyptian Co. for Metro Management & Operation
- Daily ridership: 1.3 million (FY 2009/2010)

History
- Opened: 1987; 39 years ago
- Last extension: 1999

Technical
- Line length: 44.3 km (27.53 mi)
- Character: Mixed Underground and At-grade street running
- Track gauge: 1,435 mm (4 ft 8 1/2 in)
- Electrification: Overhead catenary (1.5 kV DC)
- Operating speed: 100 km/h (62 mph)

Cairo Metro Line 1 is the first line of the Cairo Metro in Cairo, Egypt. It is the first metro system in Africa and the Middle East. It was constructed in 1987 and connects Helwan with El Marg, stopping at 35 stations. Line 1, sometimes called the French-built line or simply the French line has a total length of 44.3 kilometres (27.5 mi) with 4.7 kilometres (2.9 mi) of it being underground and has trains that run with 3 units (9 cars), which have a frequency of 2.5 minutes and a maximum speed of 100 km/h (62 mph). The line can carry 60,000 passengers per hour in each direction.

== Costs ==
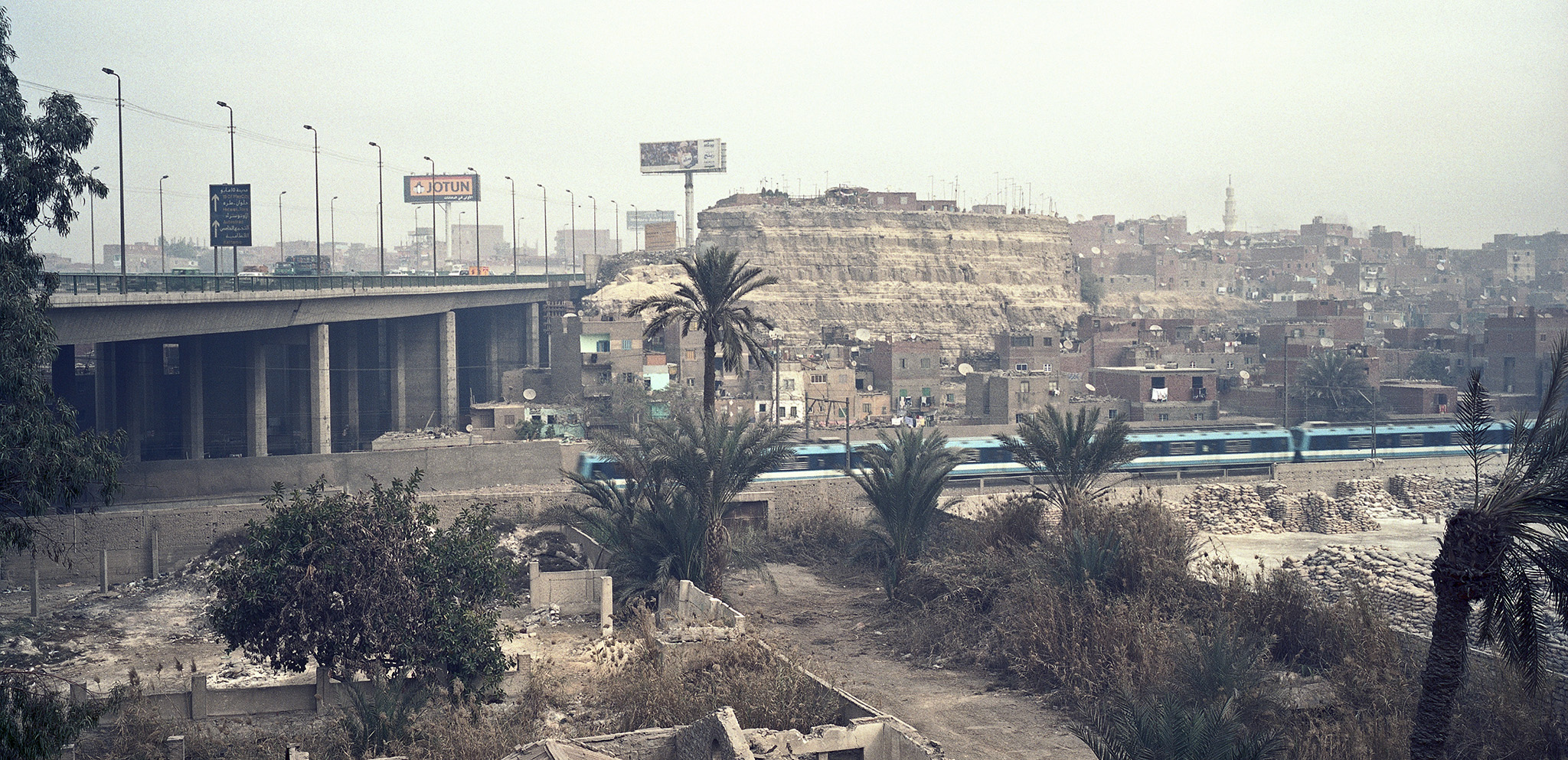
Train of Line 1 of Cairo Metro travelling at high speed between stations Dar El Salam and El Zahraa in Southern Cairo.

The Construction of the project started in 1982 after the French government agreed on giving Egypt the necessary loan. The first New Marg - Helwan line costs 1107 million Francs which were converted into Egyptian currency and divided into multiple stages. The total cost of the first stage from Helwan to Ramsis is E£473.9 million divided into the following:

1. E£397 million for the tunnel between Sayeda Zeinab and Ramsis Square with a length of 4.7 kilometres (2.9 mi) .
2. E£74.5 million for the movement of 60 km different structures and the improvement of the older railways.
3. E£2.4 million for the creation of a station in Dar El Salam.

The second stage cost in total E£499.6 million and connected the (Laymoun Bridge-Marg) railway with the metro. Additional costs were made available as requested by the ministry of transportation:

1. E£172.8 million for completing the (Ramsis-Marg) line.
2. E£280 million for the third stage of the (Helwan-Marg) line.
3. E£400 million for the (Shubra el Kheima-Ramsis-El Tahrir) line
4. E£2 million for the preparation study of the second line Imbaba-El Darasa

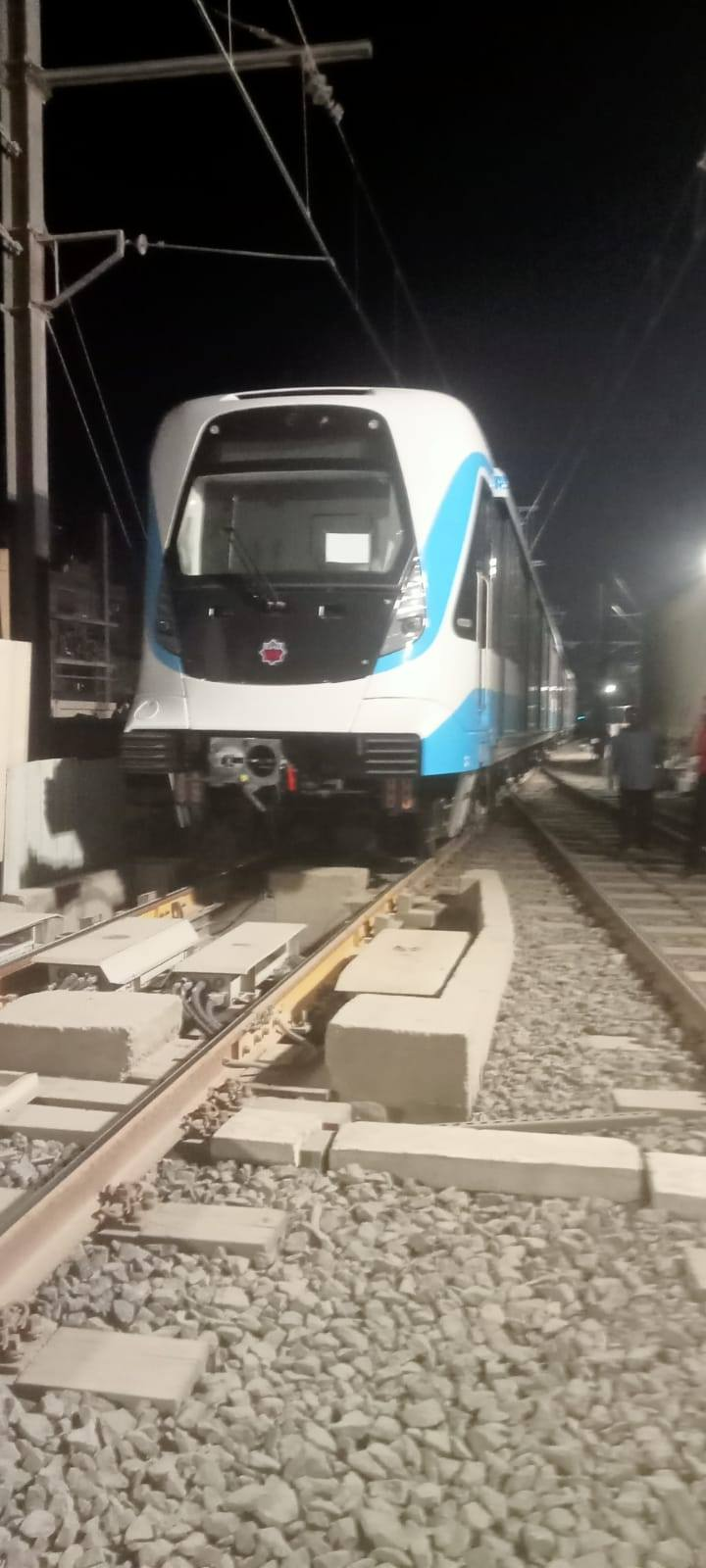
The first Metropolis train operating on the first line of the Greater Cairo Metro (taken during the trial run, May 2025 )

== Construction ==
The construction of the Helwan-El Marg line was in two stages. The first stage was from Helwan to Sayeda Zeinab and included a tunnel from Helwan to Ramses Square. First the line from Helwan to Sayeda Zeinab, which is 24 kilometres (15 mi) long had the following construction works:

1. The isolation of the existing railways and the construction of 9 car bridges and 21 people bridges.
2. The construction of 17 rail lane switcher.
3. The renovation of the existing railways.
4. The production of 882 kilometres (548 mi) of cables which satisfy the needs of the rail way from Helwan to Sayeda Zeinab.

Second the line from Helwan to Ramses Square, which would be a subterranean and is 4.5 kilometres (2.8 mi) long. It includes five subterranean stations after the Sayeda Zeinab station:

- Saad Zaghloul station
- Sadat station
- Gamal Abdel Nasser station
- Ahmed Orabi station
- Mubarak (now: Al-Shohadaa) station under Ramses Square

The Construction of this line consumed the following resources:

1. 117,000 cubic metres (153,000 cu yd) of concrete works.
2. 334,550 cubic metres (437,570 cu yd) of digging works.
3. 3900 concrete walls
4. 3,800 metres (12,500 ft) other digging works.

In 1987 the line from Helwan to Ramses Square was finished and opened for the public. It had a total length of 28.5 kilometres (17.7 mi).

The second stage of the Helwan El Marg line included the construction of a line from Ramses Square to El marg, which would be 14 kilometres (8.7 mi) long. The operation of the line was aimed for 1988, but due to some difficulties it started operation in 1989. The second stage included also:

1. The conversion of the Marg line to an electric line.
2. The acquisition of 48 new units, which would make 100 units available for operation.
3. The improvement of a workstation to provide maintenance works for 204 Units.
4. The construction of a 220 kilo-Volt power generator, to provide electricity for the future lines.

== Connections ==
=== To other Metro lines ===
Line 1 connects to Line 2 at Al-Shohadaa and Sadat stations and with Line 3 at Nasser station. It will connect to Line 4 at El Malek El Saleh station.

=== To other forms of transit ===
Shohadaa Station is immediately next to Ramses Station, providing access to Egyptian National Railways long-haul and short-haul domestic passenger service. Cairo Transport Authority buses and private microbus services are also nearby.

Access to Cairo International Airport is expected via transfer to Line 3 upon completion of Phase 4 in early 2020.

== Driving Simulator ==
A new train driving simulator integrated in Cairo Metro's training center dedicated for Line 1 drivers, which was provided by Transurb Technirail that won the international tender issued by Cairo Metro in December 2011.

Transurb Technirail will provide Cairo Metro with a driving simulator and a computer-assisted learning area to train Line 1 drivers, improving their driving skills and to train them on the elementary functions of the rolling stock and on how to handle malfunctions.

== See also ==
- List of Cairo metro stations

== Works cited ==
- Salama, Saiyed (1987). Metro Al Anfaq. Dar Al Maaref. ISBN 977-02-2155-4.
