= Cairo Metro =

Rapid transit system in Egypt

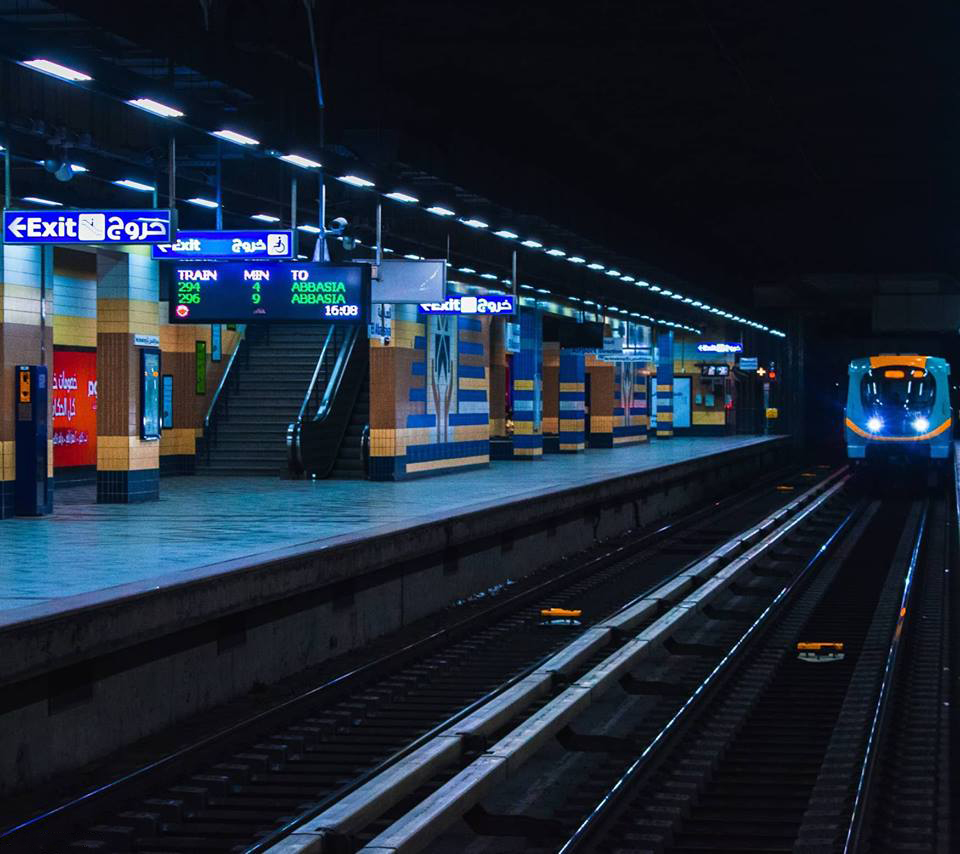
- The Cairo Metro (line 3)

Overview
- Native name: مترو أنفاق القاهرة
- Owner: National Authority for Tunnels (Egyptian state)
- Locale: Greater Cairo, Egypt
- Transit type: Rapid transit
- Number of lines: 3 (+1 under construction, +1 framework agreement signed)
- Number of stations: 89 (Note: Counting interchange stations only once.)
- Daily ridership: 5 million
- Annual ridership: 1460.0 million (2023)
- Website: Cairo Metro (in English)

Operation
- Began operation: 27 September 1987; 39 years ago
- Operators: Line 1: The Egyptian Co. for Metro Management & Operation; Line 2: The Egyptian Co. for Metro Management & Operation; Line 3: RATP Dev (15 years)
- Character: Mixed; Underground, At-grade and Elevated

Technical
- System length: Line 1: 44 km; Line 2: 21.6 km; Line 3: 41.2 km
- Track gauge: 1,435 mm (4 ft 8 1/2 in) standard gauge
- Electrification: Line 1: Overhead line,1.5 kV DC; Lines 2 and 3: Third rail, 750 V DC
System map
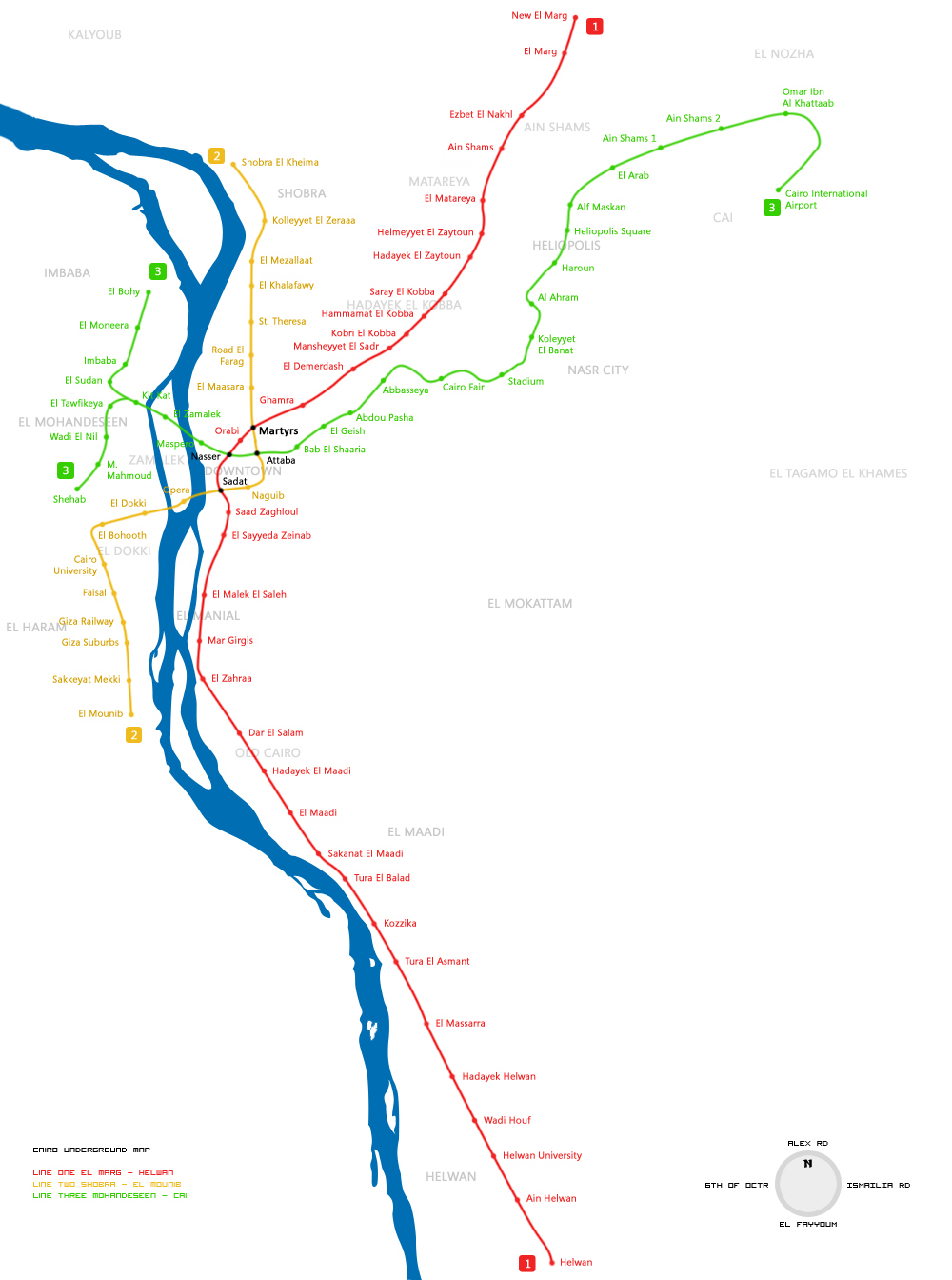

The Cairo Metro (Egyptian Arabic: مترو القاهرة, romanized: Metro Anfāq al-Qāhirah, lit. "Cairo Tunnel Metro" or مترو الأنفاق pronounced [ˈmetɾo lʔænˈfæːʔ]) is a rapid transit system in Greater Cairo, Egypt. It was the first of the three full-fledged metro systems in Africa and the first in the Middle East to be constructed. It was opened in 1987 as Line 1 from Helwan to Ramses Square with a length of 29 kilometres (18.0 mi).

As of 2013, the metro carried nearly 4 million passengers per day. As of 15 May 2024, the Cairo Metro has 84 stations of which 5 are transfer stations, with a total length of 106.8 kilometres (66.4 mi). The system consists of three operational lines numbered 1 to 3.

The Cairo Metro is owned by the National Authority for Tunnels. The lines use standard gauge (1,435 mm or 4 ft 8 1/2 in).

== History ==
=== Background ===
As the biggest and most densely populated megacity in Africa and the Middle East, Greater Cairo had a strong case for a metro. In 1987 that population stood at 10 million residents, not counting the two million or so commuters who came into Cairo every day to work. The capacity of Cairo's public transport infrastructure was around 20,000 passengers/hour, which increased to 60,000 after the construction of the metro.

=== Proposed plans ===
The idea of a metro was first proposed in the 1930s by engineer Saiyed Abdel Wahed of the Egyptian Railway Authority, however, the idea did not progress. Following the Egyptian Revolution of 1952, there was renewed interest in the idea. In 1954 French experts made a report about the future of the transportation in Egypt. They proposed a metro encompassing two lines, one 12 km (7.5 mi) long line connecting Bab al-Louq and Ismailia and a second 5 km (3.1 mi) line connecting Boulaq and Abou al-Ela Castle. They also proposed that there should be one company in charge of all transportation systems.

Later on, multiple experts came to Egypt regarding that project: Soviet experts in 1956, Japanese experts in 1960 and French experts in 1962, which concluded the following: The creation of a metro system with multiple lines. The first would be a 5 km (3.1 mi) line connecting Helwan with El-Marg going under Kasr el Eini street and Ramses Street. The second would be from Sayyidah Zaynab Mosque to Shobra going under Downtown Cairo and would be 9.5 km (5.9 mi) long. The third would be from Giza to Abbaseya and would be 11.5 km (7.1 mi) long. The fourth would be from Al Awqaf to the Castle and would be 6.7 km (4.2 mi) long.

In 1964, British experts advised the creation of a metro line from Bab El Louk to Shubra. In 1966 Japanese experts advised the creation of a lane between Helwan and El Marg and another one going through Mohandiseen, Heliopolis and 26 of July Street, for a total of 26 km (16.2 mi). Lastly, in 1969, the government approved the need for a study showing the needed capacity for Cairo's transportation system. The Egyptian Ministry of Transport issued an international tender for the creation of the study. Eight companies applied and the French company SOFRETU won the tender on 20 September 1970. The study was finished in 1973 and included mainly the study of the population development in Cairo and its needs for transportation capacity in 1980, 1985 and 1990. It concluded the necessity for three lines in greater Cairo to solve the transportation problem. The first line would use the already available railways (Helwan-Bab El luk and Al Laymoun Bridge-El Marg) and connect them through a metro. It would be in total 43 km (26.7 mi) long. The second line would be 13.5 km (8.4 mi) and connect Shubra El-Kheima and Bulaq going through Ramses Street and Tahrir Square. The third line would go from El Darasa to Imbaba and would be in total 10 km (6.2 mi) long.

The priority for the project was the first line which would reduce 30% of the daily transport to and from Cairo and would incorporate pre-existing rail infrastructure. The detailed study of the construction took 6 years from 1975 to 1981. A tender was made for the construction of the metro and the Egyptian-French company Entra Nevra Arabco won it and had the task of constructing the metro system.

=== Construction works ===
The construction of Line 1 started in 1982 after the French government agreed on giving Egypt the necessary loan. The first section was opened on 27 September 1987 and the line was completed in 1989 connecting Helwan with El Marg and consisting of 34 stations with a total length of 42.5 km of which 4.7 km underground. In 1999, New El Marg station was added to the northern end of the line, bringing its total length to 44 km. Helwan University station was built between Wadi Houf and Ain Helwan stations.

Cairo's metro network was greatly expanded in the mid-1990s with the building of Line 2, from Shoubra El Kheima to Cairo University, with an extension to Giza. The line includes the first tunnel under the Nile. The construction of the line was finished in October 2000, and it was later extended to El Mounib.

== Operations ==
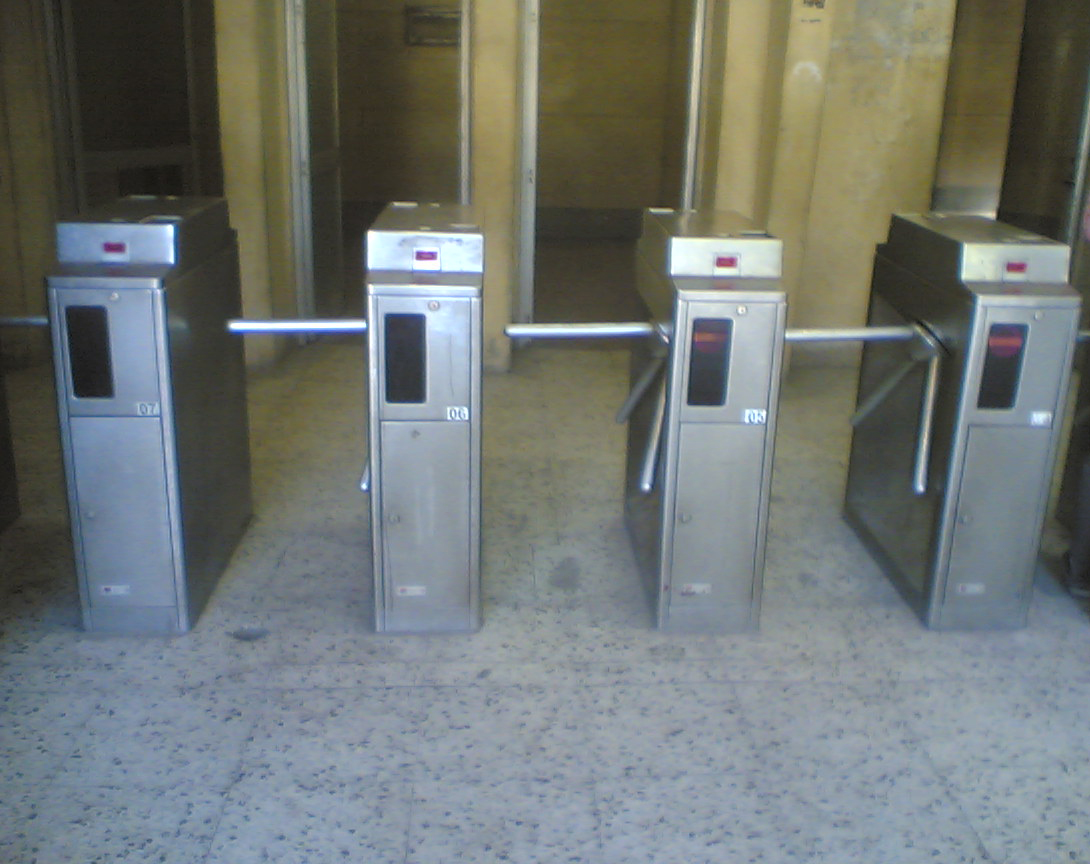
Old Cairo Metro turnstile gates (standard ticket); In mid-2010s, those turnstiles were phased out and replaced with newer ones

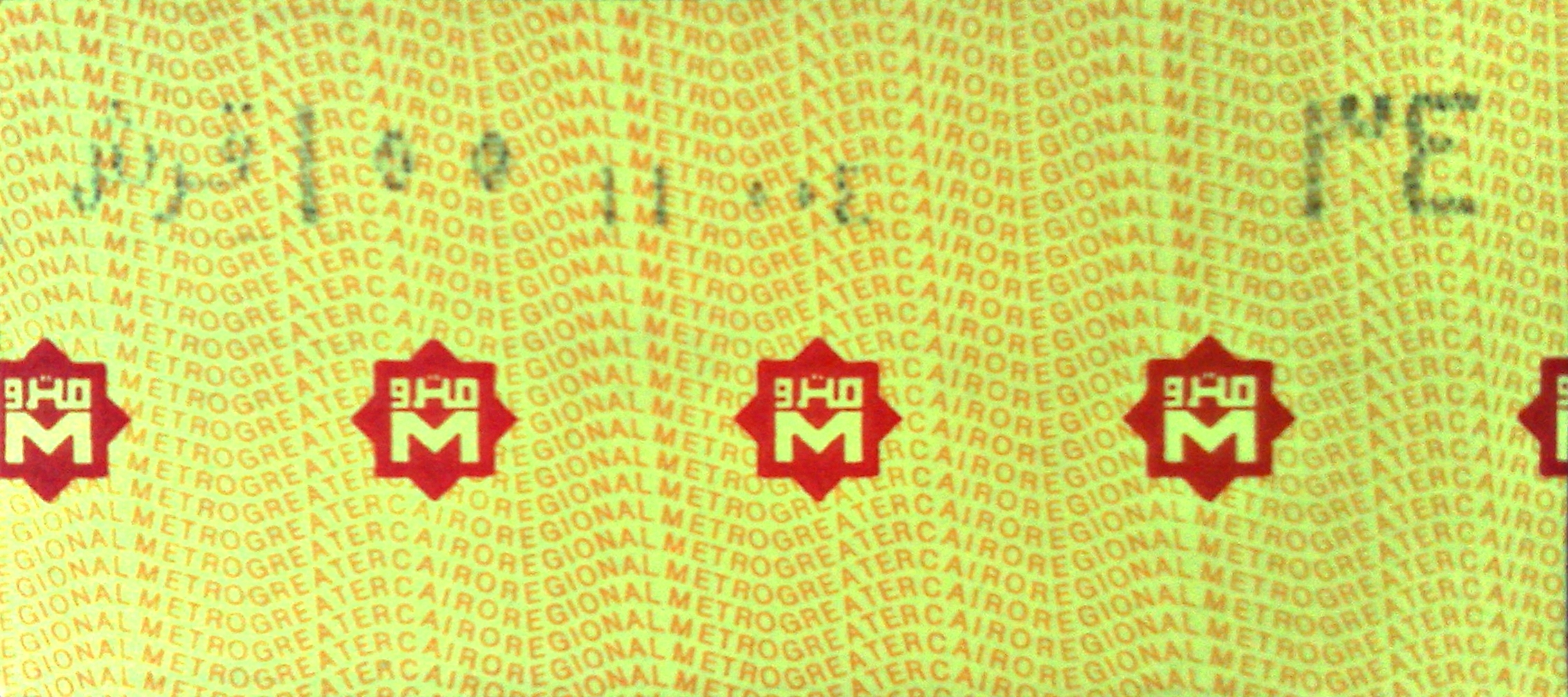
Old Cairo Metro ticket (front side)

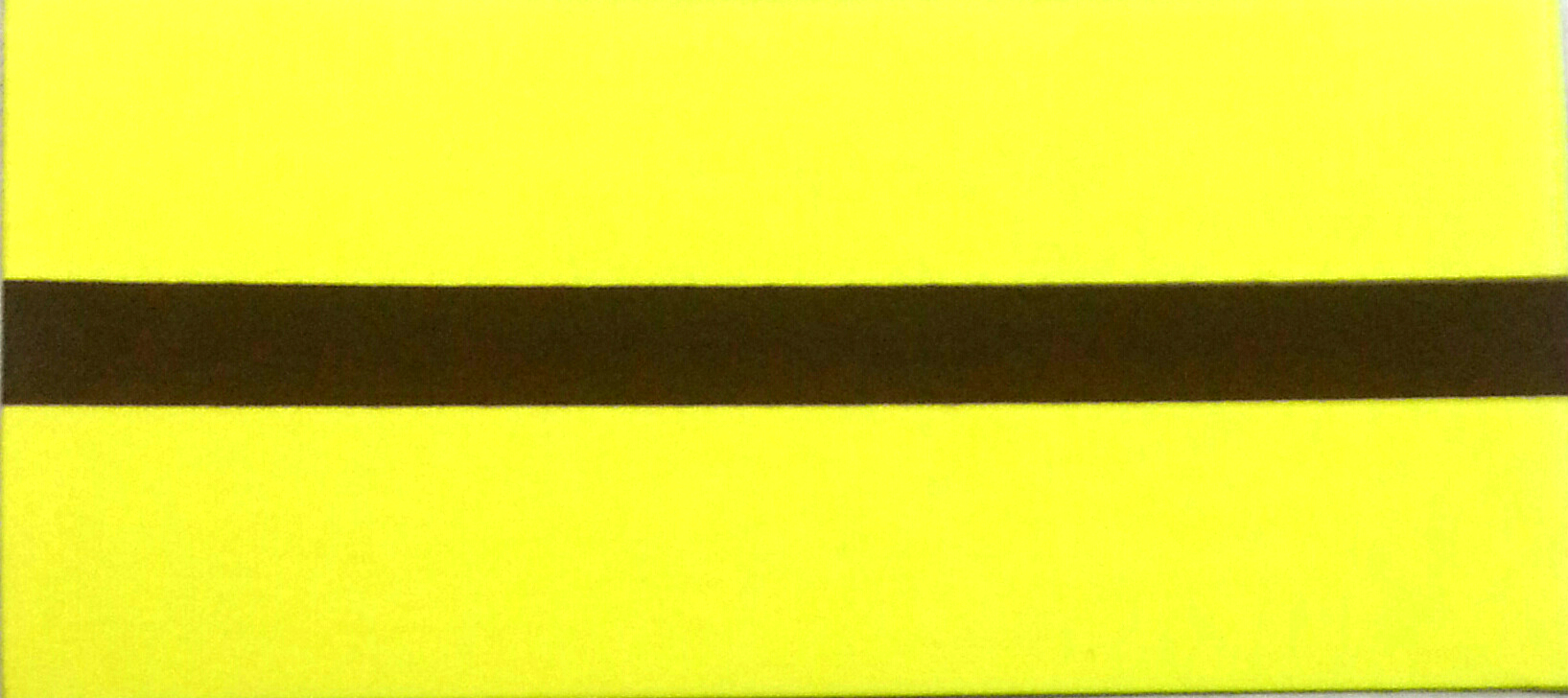
Old Cairo Metro ticket (back side)

The middle two cars (4th and 5th) of each train have been reserved for women since 1989 (the 5th car becomes mixed-use after 21:00). There are blue signs (pink on the first and second lines) at every station that signify the position of these cars. These cars are used as an option for women who do not wish to ride with men in the same car; however, women can still ride other cars freely. This policy was introduced to the protection of women from sexual harassment by men.

Cairo Metro operates from 05:00 to 01:00 (except during Ramadan, when it operates from 05:00 to 02:00), with the remaining hours reserved for maintenance work.

The ticket price was £E1 for each journey, regardless of distance. The Ministry of Transportation agreed to double the ticket prices, starting from Friday 24 March 2017, costing £E2 for the normal ticket£, E1.5 for the ticket of the minor£, E1 for the special needs ticket after formerly costing £E1£, E0.75 and £E0.5, respectively. Again on 10 May 2018, the ministry of transportation agreed to raise the ticket prices to be £E3 for 9 stops£, E5 for 16 stops and £E7 for more than 16 stops. As of July 2020, 9 stops cost £E5, 16 stops cost £E7, and rides exceeding 16 stops cost £E10. In 2025 the ticket prices increased to be £E8 for 9 stops, £E10 for 16 stops£, E15 for 23 stops, and £E20 for more than 23 stops. Starting March 27th, 2026, the Ministry of Transport has raised the prices for shorter routes, with up to 9 stops now costing £E10 and up to 16 stops costing £E12. The prices for up to 23 stops and more than 23 stops remains unchanged, sitting at £E15 and £E20, respectively.

== Network ==
Line	Termini	Opened	Latest extension	Length	Stations
1	New Marg – Helwan	1987	1999	44 km (27 mi)	35
2	Shubra Al Khaimah – El Monib	1996	2005	21.6 km (13.4 mi)	20
3	Rod El Farag Corridor/Cairo University – Adly Mansour	2012	2024	41.2 km (25.6 mi)	34
Total:				106.8 km (66.4 mi)	84

=== Line 1 ===
Line 1 (blue) is the oldest line of the Cairo Metro and the first metro to open in Africa and the Middle East, with its first 29-kilometre (18.0 mi) segment having opened in 1987. The line is 44 kilometres (27 mi) long and serves 35 stations. This line carries trains with 3 units (9 train cars), which have a headway of 3.5 to 4 minutes, and a maximum speed of 80 km/h (50 mph). The line can carry 60,000 passengers per hour in each direction.

Line 1 has a train driving simulator supplied by Transurb Technirail that won the international tender issued by Cairo Metro in 2011.

=== Line 2 ===
Line 2 (red) is the second line of the Cairo Metro, first opening in 1996. The line is 21.6 kilometres (13.4 mi) long, of which 13 kilometres (8.1 mi) are in tunnels. It serves 20 stations, of which 12 are underground. It is mostly in the bored tunnel, with two exceptions: a short section at the northern end approaching Shubra El Kheima which is elevated, and a section just south of this by cut-and-cover. Line 2 uses the third rail electrification system instead of the overhead line used in the first line. The communication extension for line 2 was provided by Alcatel in 2005.

The minimum headway for the line is 2.7 to 3 minutes.

Line 2 has a simulator installed in Shubra since 2002 which was delivered by French company CORYS.

The first tunnel to be built under the Nile River carries Line 2 across the river.

=== Line 3 ===
Line 3 (green) is the newest line. Its first section opened in 2012. It operates from Rod El-Farag Corridor and Cairo University to Adly Mansour, where it connects to the Cairo Light Rail Transit. Eventually, it will be extended to Cairo International Airport. The line crosses under the two branches of the River Nile, as does Line 2. The total length of the line will be approximately 50 kilometres (31.1 mi), most of which are in the bored tunnel, and will be implemented in four phases.

Phase 1 from Attaba station to Abbassia station opened on 21 February 2012, with five stations and a total length of 4.3 kilometres (2.7 mi). Phase 2 to Al Ahram Station was opened on 7 May 2014, with four additional stations and an added length of 7.7 kilometres (4.8 mi), for a total length of 12.0 kilometres (7.5 mi). Phase 4A from Al Ahram to El Shams Club opened on 15 June 2019 (except for Heliopolis Square station which opened later that year). Phase 3A from Attaba station to Kit Kat station opened in October 2022. Phase 3B from Kit Kat station to Rod El-Farag Corridor station opened in January 2024, adding six more stations and 6.6 kilometres (4.1 mi). and began revenue service on 1 January 2024. Phase 3C from Kit Kat to Cairo University was opened on 15 May 2024.

=== Line 4 ===
Construction began in 2024 for completion in 2028.

Phase 1 (west) of the project will run from El-Malek El-Saleh Station (Interchange with Line 1) to the October-Oasis Highway Station with a total length of 18 km, passing through Giza Railway Station (Interchange with Line 2); the original plan for phase 1 was for it to start from El-Malek El-Saleh Station and end at the Grand Egyptian Museum Station with a total length of 10 km, but the Ministry of Roads & Transportation decided to extend the Line in their efforts to further connect the city of 6 October to the Greater Cairo Area; Phase 1 also includes the plan to connect the end of Line 4 to the suburbs of 6 October mainly through executing The October 6th Tram system (The O6T) which will be by using a tram-train system supplied with the Alstom Regio-Citadis trams. This phase will have 15 stations to be constructed with a duration of 6.5 years. Phase 1 stations will be equipped with an automatic fare collection system and platform screen doors, and will include elevators for the use of disabled passengers. Phase 1 bidding was postponed until May 2015 to enable Japan International Cooperation Agency (JICA) to complete the feasibility study and to resolve other problems with the construction starting by 2015 or 2016 according to Ismail El-Nagdy, Chairman of the National Authority for Tunnels with Japan International Cooperation Agency financing a $1.2 billion loan, while Egyptian government would cover the remainder, $2.4 billion.

== Expansions ==
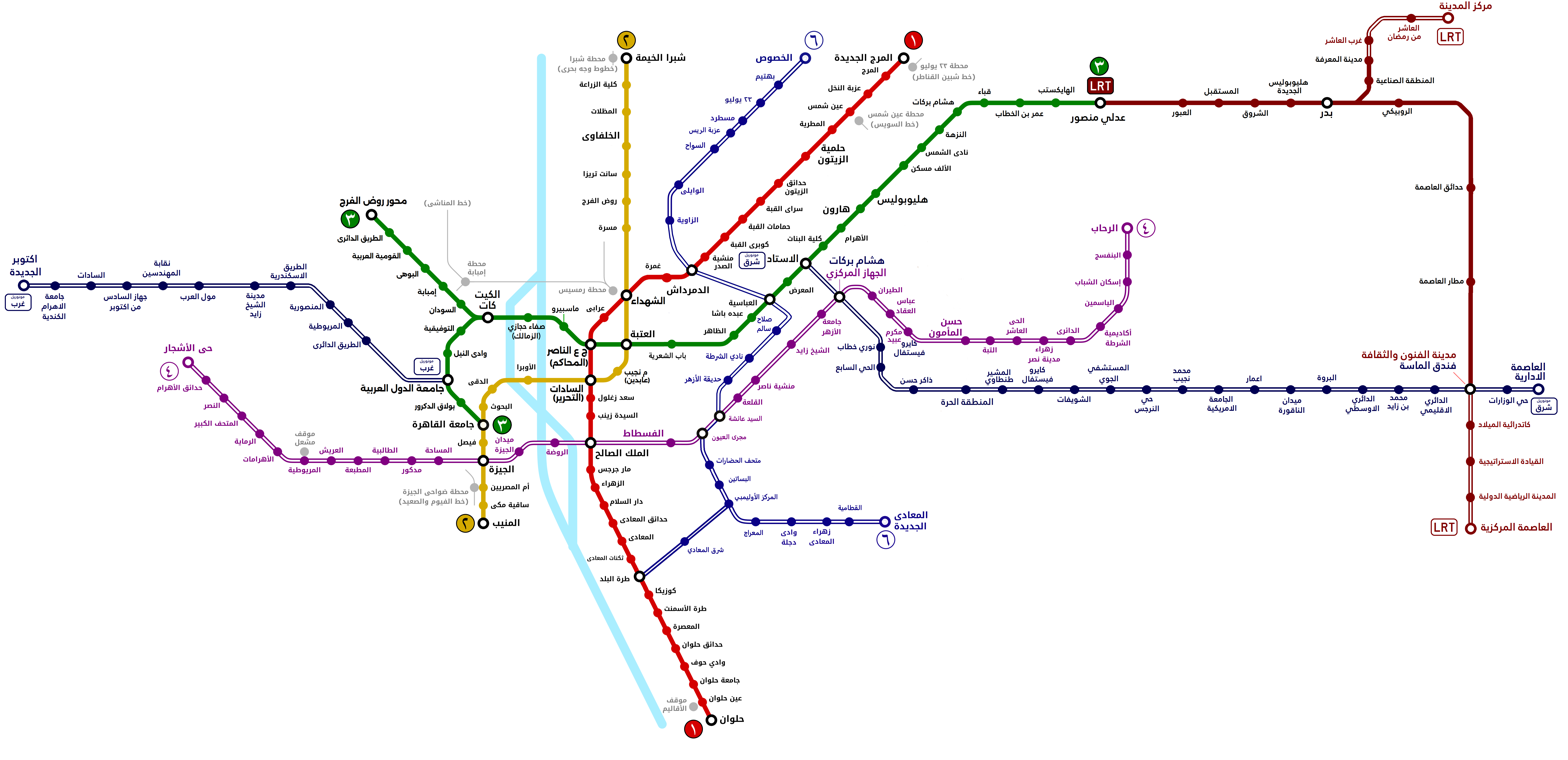
Cairo Metro, LRT, and monorail expansion plans

=== Current plans ===
Line	Segment	Length	Stations	Status	Planned Opening
1	Sheikh Mansour	0	1	Under Construction	TBA
4	Hadayek Al Ashgar — El Fustat	19	17	Under Construction	2028
3	Heliopolis — Cairo Airport	9.2	7	Under Study	
1	New El Marg — Shibin El Qanater	19	14	Under Study	
2	Shubra El-Kheima — Qalyub	3.2	3	Under Study	
4	El Fustat — Depot & Interchange	26.9	21	Under Study	
4	Hadayek Al Ashgar — Al Hosary	16.3	10	Under Study	
4	Depot & Interchange — Capital International Airport	38.7	8	Under Study	
6	El-Khosoos — New Maadi — Tura El Balad	38.1	26	Under Study	
6	New Maadi — Mohammed Naguib — Narjis	23	TBA	Under Study	
Total:		193.4	100		

=== Line 4 (Phase 2, 3, and 4) ===
Line 4 is planned to run from Haram District to the New Cairo district, connecting Greater Cairo from West to East. It will cross the two branches of the Nile river and have a total length of 24 kilometres (14.9 mi). Construction began in 2024 for completion in 2028.

Phase 2 will begin from El-Malek El-Saleh Station, passing east through Magra El-Oyoun street and Salah El-Din Citadel in Salah Salem street and ending at the 6th District Station (beginning of Nasr City district) with a completion date set at October 2018.

Phase 3 will begin from 6th District Station and end at Makram Ebeid Station, following Mustafa El-Nahas street in bored tunnels under the existing old tram system, and ultimately deconstructing the old railway and paving its right-of-way (increasing the street by two lanes in each direction, which is critically needed to lighten the traffic congestion in the area). This phase has a completion date set for October 2019. Mitsubishi was the only company to submit an offer on a tender for 64 trains in the third and fourth phases of the project. The offer was accepted in October 2018.

Phase 4, the final phase, will begin from Makram Ebeid Station with bored tunnels following Doctor Hassan El-Sherif street and Ahmed El-Zomor street, ending at Police Academy Station near the Ring Road.

=== Qalyub Line 2 extension ===
As of December 2017, Spokesperson for the Egyptian National Authority for Tunnels (NAT) said that there are plans to extend Line 2 7 kilometers to the north from Shubra Al-Kheima station to end at Qalyub station due to the increasing traffic in north Cairo entrances. He also said that bidding will be held in February 2018 and the winner will be revealed mid-2018. The station will be an at-grade station built parallel to the train railway, bridges will be built to divert traffic from the Metro route.

=== Cairo International Airport Line 3 extension ===
Line 3 Phase 4C is proposed to start from Heliopolis station passing through Al-Hegaz Square and Military Academy area to Sheraton District and after 7.0 km (4.3 mi) ending at Cairo International Airport. If built, it would have five tunnel stations. There is no proposed completion date for this phase.

=== Long-term plans ===
A transportation study of the Greater Cairo region was completed in 1999. It recommended the implementation of a six-line system consisting of lines 1, 2 and 3 (existing); and lines 4, 5 and 6. The completed Metro Network would be capable of serving most of the densely populated areas in the Greater Cairo region, which was much in need of a comprehensive mass transit system. The plans include interchange stations between the six metro lines and would also provides interchange facilities with existing main railway stations, the airport, and bus stations.

The six planned metro lines aim to meet the transportation demands of the Greater Cairo area up to the year 2032. However, the actual construction and implementation schedule will be restricted by available funding, and the timetable will likely slip.

Line 5 would be a half-circular line connecting lines 1–4 in northern Cairo, running from Nasr City in the east to Port Said Street and Shubra El Kheima in the west. It would have a length of 20 kilometres (12 mi), entirely within bored tunnels. It would intersect Line 1 at Helmiet el-Zaitoun station, Line 2 at El-Khalafawy station, Line 3 at Haroun station, and Line 4 at Al-Wafaa we al-Amal station. The Line 5 project was scrapped since its route resembles that of the newly constructed BRT system.

Line 6 would be a north–south line, from Shubra in the north to the Maadi and Tura districts in the south. It would run from Khosuos Station through El Kalaa street in bored tunnels to Salah Eldin Citadel Station (Interchange with Line 4) and move on from there to both districts via bored tunnels using the existing route El-Mahager Railway as a guide through both Maadi and Helwan. This Line has a length of 19 kilometres (12 mi). It would intersect Line 1 at El-Demerdash and Tura El-Balad stations, Line 3 at El-Abassiya station, Line 4 at El-Sayeda Aisha station.

== See also ==
- List of Cairo Metro stations
- List of metro systems
- Cairo Light Rail Transit
- Cairo Monorail
