= Palais Vaissier =

Former mansion in Tourcoing, France

- Château Vaissier or Palais du Congo
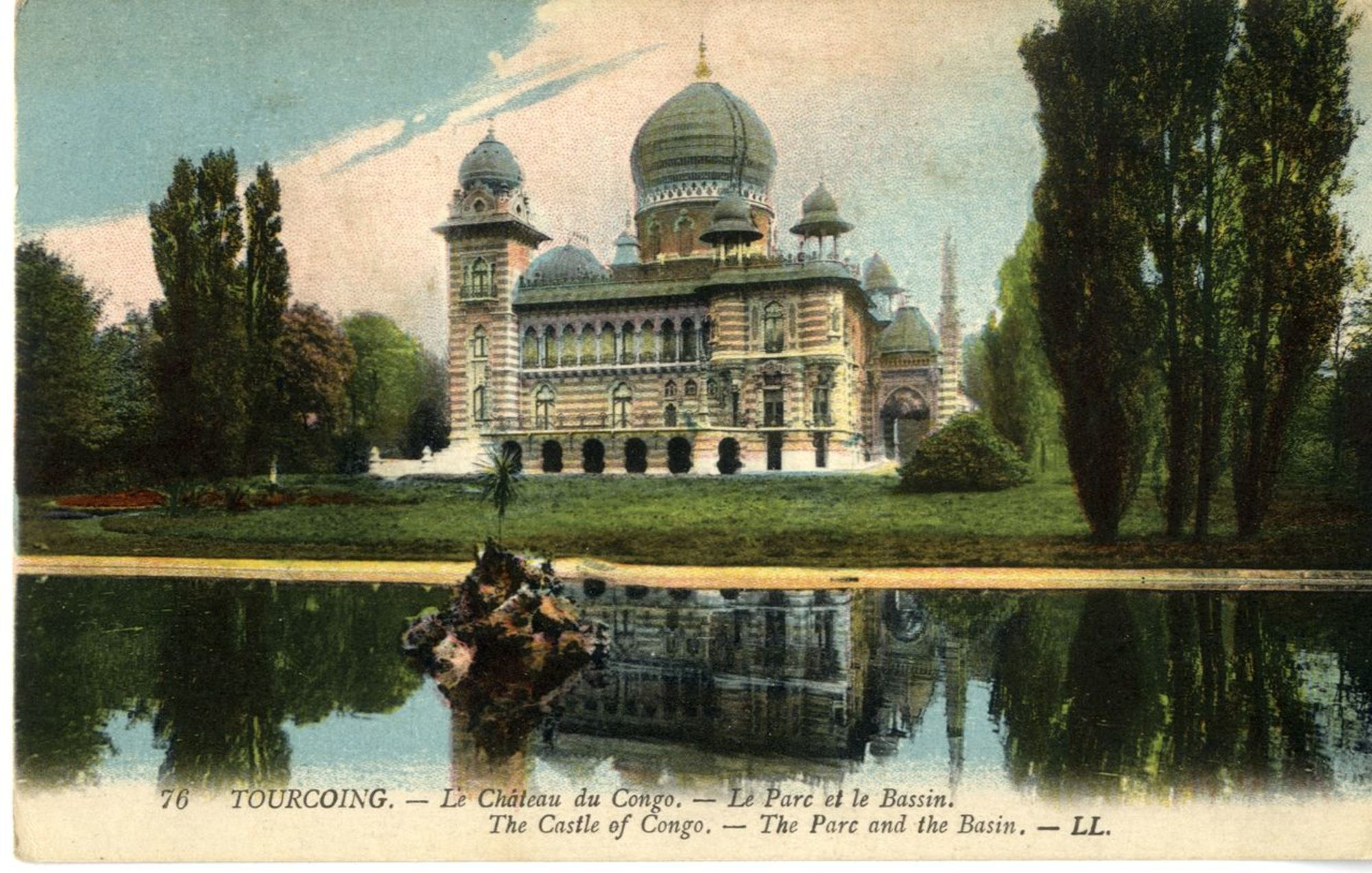
- Interactive map of the Palais Vaissier area

General information
- Type: Private residence, villa
- Location: Tourcoing, Nord, France
- Coordinates: 50°41′45″N 3°8′39″E
- Construction started: 1891
- Completed: 1892
- Client: Victor Vaissier

Technical details
- Structural system: Masonry, iron

Design and construction
- Architect: Edouard Dupire-Rozan
- Engineer: André Michelin

The Palais Vaissier (also called the Château Vassier or Palais du Congo) was a large Orientalist mansion in Tourcoing, Nord, (France), which served as the distinctive home of industrialist Victor Vaissier. It was designed by French architect Édouard Dupire-Rozan and built in 1891–92, but was demolished in 1929. Two of its outbuildings, the residences of its concierge and the gardener, have been preserved, however, and can be viewed today from the street.

== Background ==
The area of the département du Nord in the second half of the nineteenth century was notably associated with exoticism and colonialism. The Musée industriel et commercial et des colonies was created in Lille in 1853, to be renamed the Musée commercial et colonial in 1884, no doubt spurred on by the area's links to overseas shipping. This sparked a more general curiosity for the exotic and "the other," including the representations of African, Asian and Australasian natives as "savages." At the same time, the first industrial workers began to arrive from Kabylia, the coast of Algeria, to work in the coal mines in Valenciennes and the textile factories of Roubaix, and dockworkers from Africa and Asia found employment in Dunkirk.

Victor Vaissier, an industrialist born in Roubaix in 1851, was one of the most successful manufacturer of soaps and perfumes in France at the end of the nineteenth century, and positioned himself at the center of this milieu. He fashioned himself as the "King Makoko," and starting in 1887, he organized local cavalcades featuring the Prince of Congo, the emblem of his soap brand La Savonnerie du Congo. That March in Roubaix, a fantastical parade celebrating Africa took place, with Vaissier playing the part of the king. His was not the only brand of French soaps that played on exotic, Orientalist tropes, however. Vaissier's products were branded the "Savon du Congo" [Congo Soap], and his factory employed some 400 industrial workers, along with 15 office staff and 20 traveling salesman, with numerous shops abroad, including in Johannesburg, Tunis, and Copenhagen. Vaissier's products were regularly shown at international exhibitions between 1888 and 1906, and many examples of the packaging and lithographed labels, some in the Art Nouveau style, still exist. They were held in such high esteem that Vaissier became an official supplier of soaps and perfumes to Leopold II, King of Belgium (who, infamously, personally owned the territory of the Congo in central Africa); the King of Romania; the Royal Court of Spain; the Bey of Tunis; the Compagnie Internationale des Wagons-Lits and its subsidiary, the Compagnie Internationale des Grands Hotels.

== History and design ==
Vaissier dreamed of building for himself a residence that reflected his high aspirations, his economic status and future ambitions. He no longer would live between the blackened walls of his factory on the rue de Mouvaux in Roubaix, and instead planned to move to a plot of land located at the exact same address (2, rue de Mouvaux) in neighboring Tourcoing. The plot of land on which the house sat is so close to the municipal boundaries between the two cities that postcards depicting the Palais Vaissier in the early twentieth century frequently situated it in either municipality, as well as varying their identification of the structure as the "Château Vaisser," "Château du Congo," "Château de M. Victor Vaissier," and "Château des Princes du Congo" being the most popular.

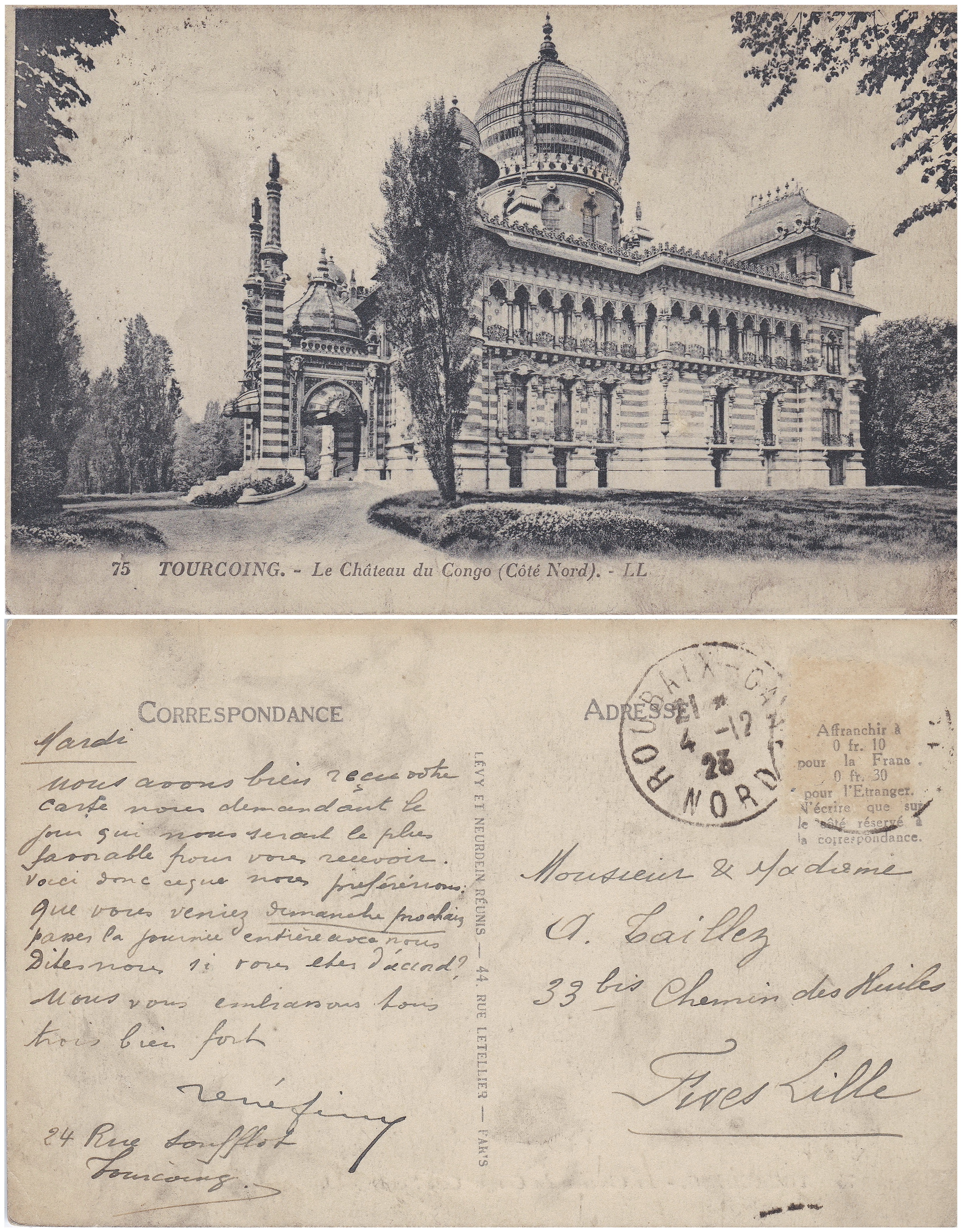
The Palais Vaissier on one of many postcards depicting it.

Vaissier hired the prominent local architect Édouard Dupire-Rozan (1842—1901), himself a native of Roubaix who had trained in the atelier of Charles-Auguste Questel at the Ecole des Beaux-Arts in Paris, before returning to Roubaix and making his name building a number of large villas for industrialists in the region. Vaisser asked Dupire-Rozan to design his house according to the following programme: a sumptuous château, majestic and original, representing an Oriental form and style, surmounted by a grand dome adorned with stained glass. The resulting mansion was built in 1891–92 in a park covering five hectares, extending from the rue de Nouveau to the avenue Grau, and from the rue du Congo and a canal. This large verdant landscape was punctuated by ponds supplied with water by fountains and adorned with boulders, and a brook traversed by a rustic-looking bridge apparently made from largely unseen logs or branches. Though initially Vaissier had hoped Dupire-Rozan might design him a house perched on the forms of four massive elephants, it became clear that this would be impractical.

The completed design, with its bulbous onion-shaped dome, evoked quite clearly the form of the Taj Mahal and contained numerous allusions to the traditional art and architecture of India; Dupire-Rozan knew Louis Rousselet's book L’Inde des Rajahs: Voyage Dans L'Inde Centrale et Dans Les Présidences de Bombay et du Bengale (1875), known for its photographic depictions of Indian sites. He designed the château using essentially a cubic volume of two main stories containing a series of rectangular rooms arranged around a large central hall, covering over 100 square meters, containing a grand staircase topped by the dome. It was approached by a porte-cochère which covered a part of a semicircular driveway. Conventionally, the more public functional rooms (salons, dining rooms, kitchen) were located on the ground floor, with bedrooms on the upper level. The public rooms were decorated in various different styles: there was a Japanese salon, a Moorish revival salon and separate dining room, an Indian salon and separate dining room, and another dining room in Renaissance-revival style. The interior furniture for many of the rooms decorated in Orientalist styles did authentically come from Syria and/or Egypt and was often decorated with carved or inlaid kufic Arabic script.

The Palais Vaissier had its own electric generator which permitted the glass dome, 35 meters high, to be illuminated at night. Embellished with horizontal registers of different colors of glass, it was undergirded by a structure of metal constructed by the engineer André Michelin, who himself was an iron manufacturer before launching his own foray into producing pneumatic tires (and founder of the Michelin company). It required the expertise and technical capabilities of numerous other firms in Roubaix and in Paris, which were published in the architectural journal L'Architecture et la Construction dans le Nord in 1892. The striking building, unlike any other in the area and virtually any other in France, was visible at least partially from multiple directions in the area, probably providing some use as an orienting landmark. The Palais Vaissier was soon depicted on thousands of postcards, some of which were hand-colored and give a sense of the garish color scheme and contrasting materials of stone, brick, metal, wood, and glass; many of these are displayed in Gilles' Maury's 2013 monograph (in French) on the château.

== Sale and demise ==
Victor Vaissier's fortunes, even before World War I broke out, began to level off. In 1903, Vaissier financed another municipal Orientalist celebration like the cavalcade of 1887, which strained his finances. Eventually, he decided, not the least because of the expensive upkeep of the Palais Vaissier, to sell it and remain its tenant. His business, for unknown reasons, also seemed to recede, and Vaissier inexplicably stopped exhibiting his products at any expositions after 1906, not even the Exposition Internationale du Nord de la France, held in Roubaix in 1911, and the enterprise was not mentioned once in the grand report of industry in the Nord département for 1909.

The Nord département was one of the regions of France most devastated by the First World War. During the German occupation, beginning in 1914, the château housed staff of the German army, who photographed themselves enjoying the landscaped surrounding park. The Germans also requisitioned and demounted many of the metal fittings of the Palais Vaissier itself, and, located in occupied German territory, the Vaissier factory virtually ceased production.

Upon the death of Victor Vaissier in 1923, his family attempted to sell the house to the city of Tourcoing, which demurred. In 1925, the showman Jean Deconinck, head of a group of three investors, did buy the property, envisioning that it might serve multiple profitable purposes, but none was ever realised. At one point in February 1926, it served as an (appropriate) staging ground for the sale of a collection of Oriental rugs, documented by photographs of the displays, which also testify to the continued excellent condition and maintenance of the interiors. In 1929, with no foreseeable profitable future uses on the horizon, the mansion was demolished, a process which was also well-documented in images. The property was divided and sold to different buyers for redevelopment. Subsequently, the novelist Maxence Van der Meersch established a concubinage at 246 rue Lamartine, in the district of Capreau in Wasquehal, then located along the canal at 7 quai des Allies, in a house built on part of the site of the ruins of the former Palais Vaissier.

Today the only public evidence of the former Palais Vaissier consists of the two remaining pavilions housing the former concierge and gardener, respectively, which since 1988 have been protected as historic monuments. Both of them exhibit the distinctive Indian-inspired Orientalist design with onion-shaped roofs, tile, ironwork, and coloured stone that matched the original design of the mansion itself. They are easy to spot from the street among the rest of the houses built in an interwar Art Deco style. Numerous surviving pieces of the furniture also still exist, many in private collections or in the collections of the city of Roubaix.

== Gallery ==
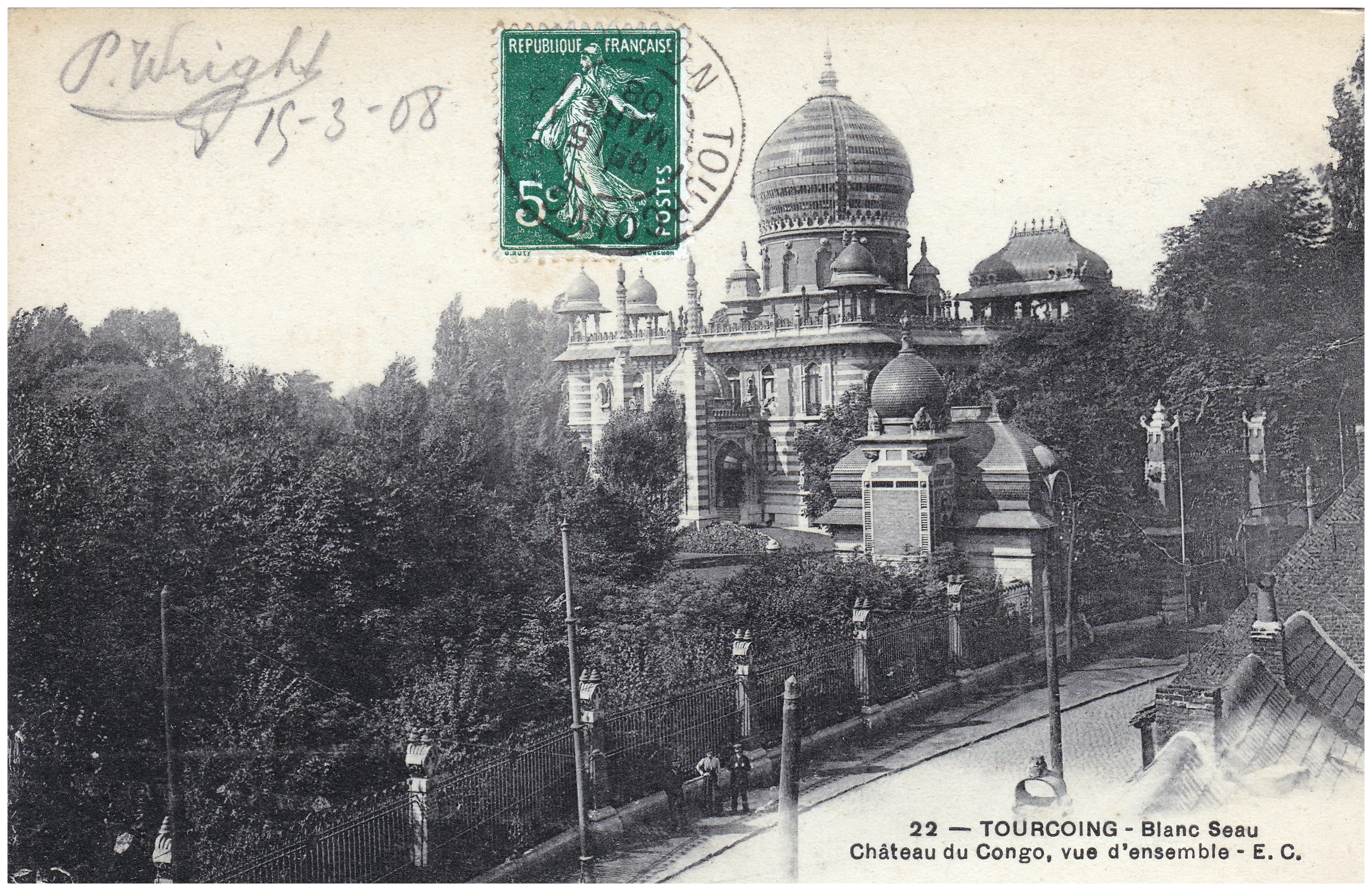
Palais Vaissier in Tourcoing, seen from the grounds

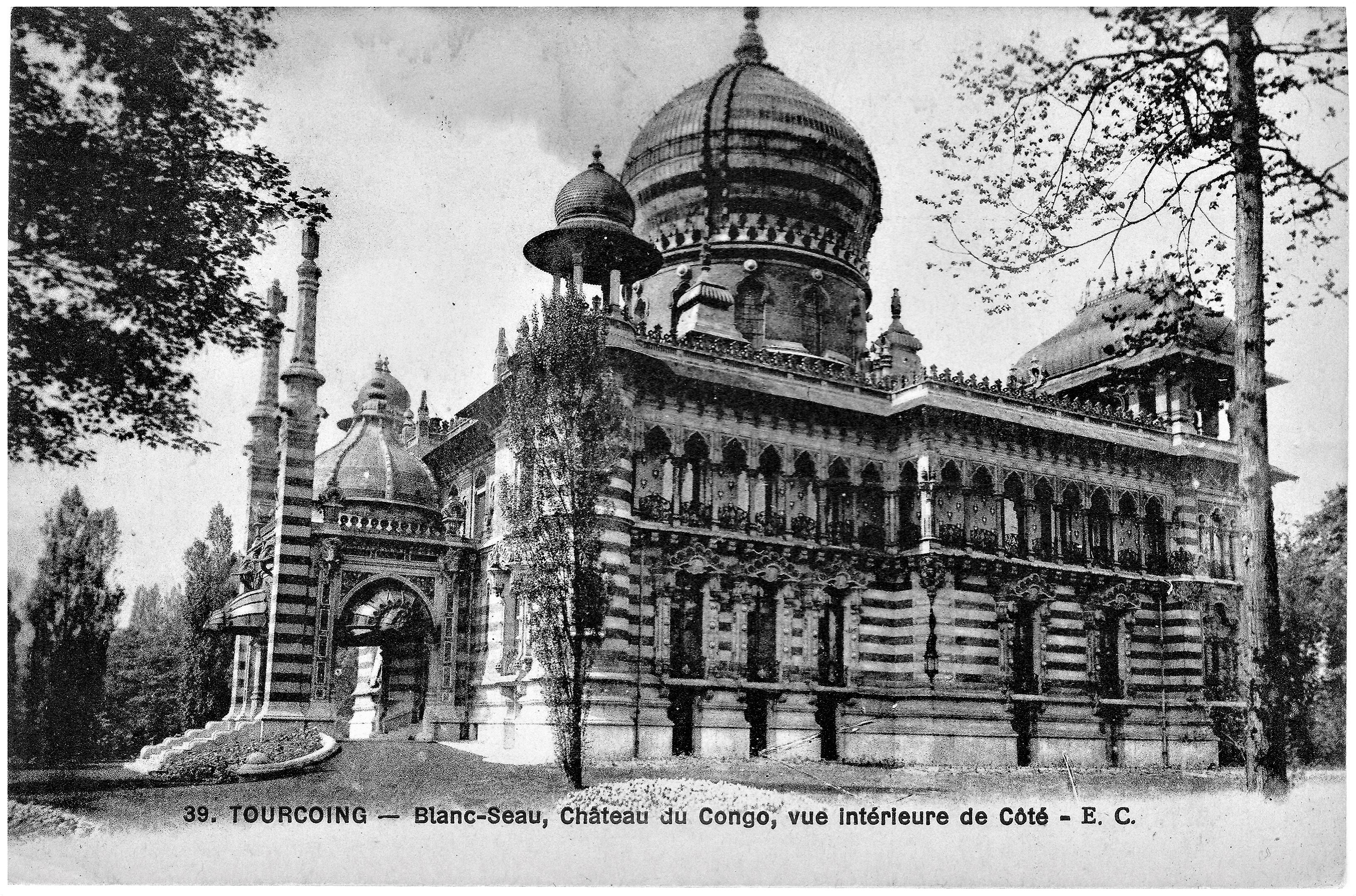
Close-up view of the house

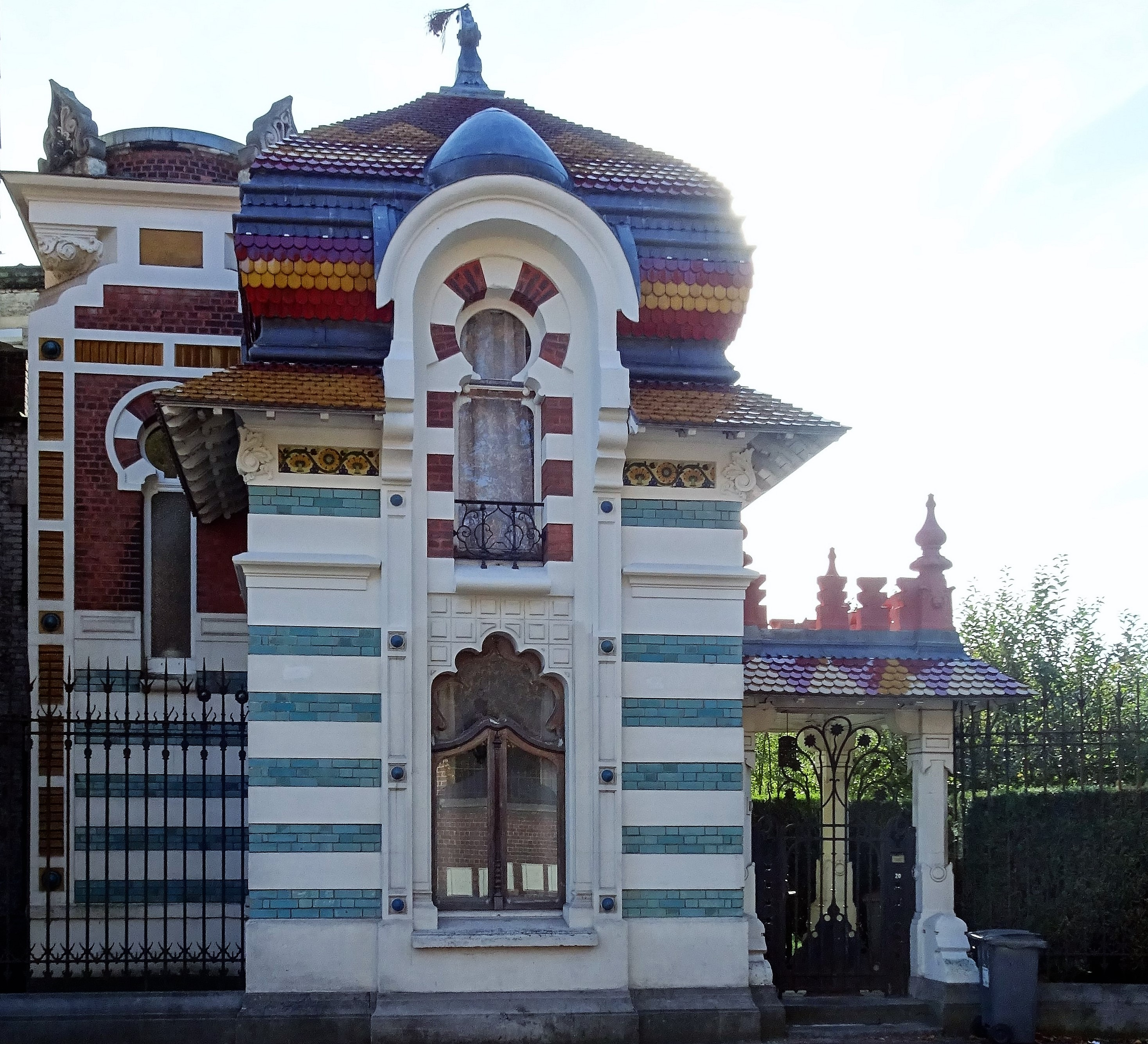
Surviving concierge's house

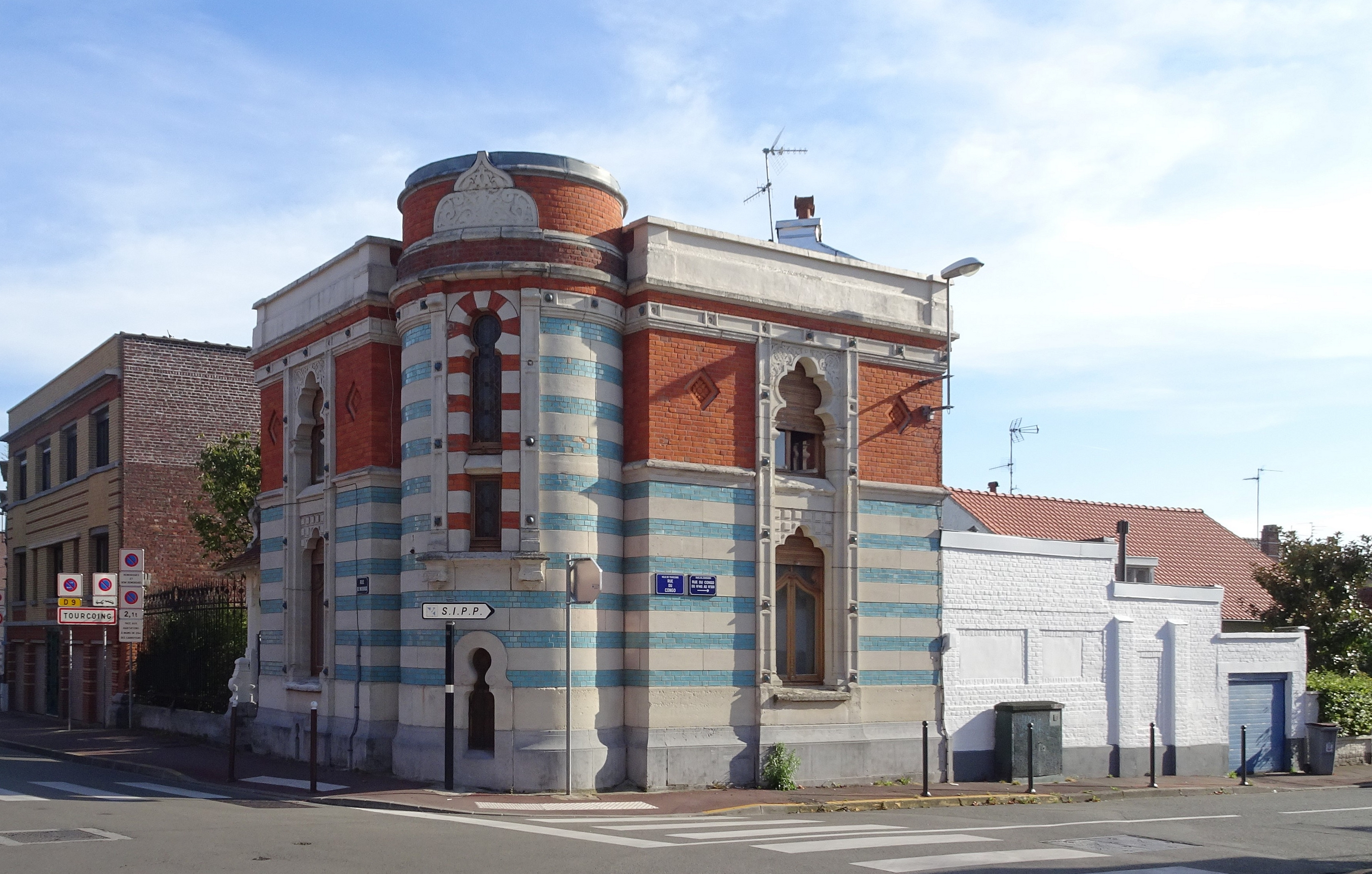
Surviving gardener's house

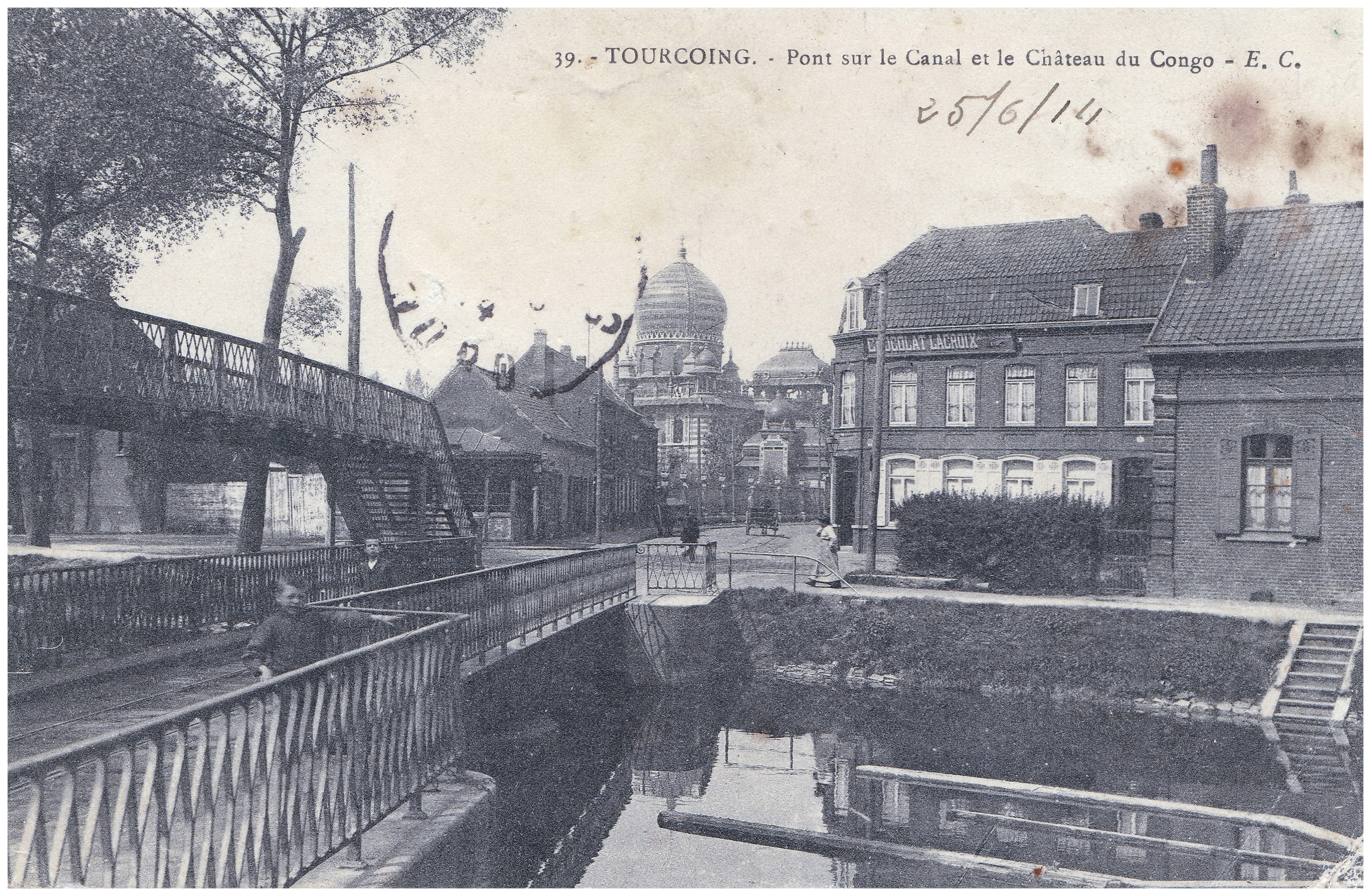
Bridge over the canal bordering Vaissier's property, with château in the distance
