= Cairo Marriott Hotel =

Hotel in Cairo, Egypt

Coordinates: 30°03′25″N 31°13′29″E

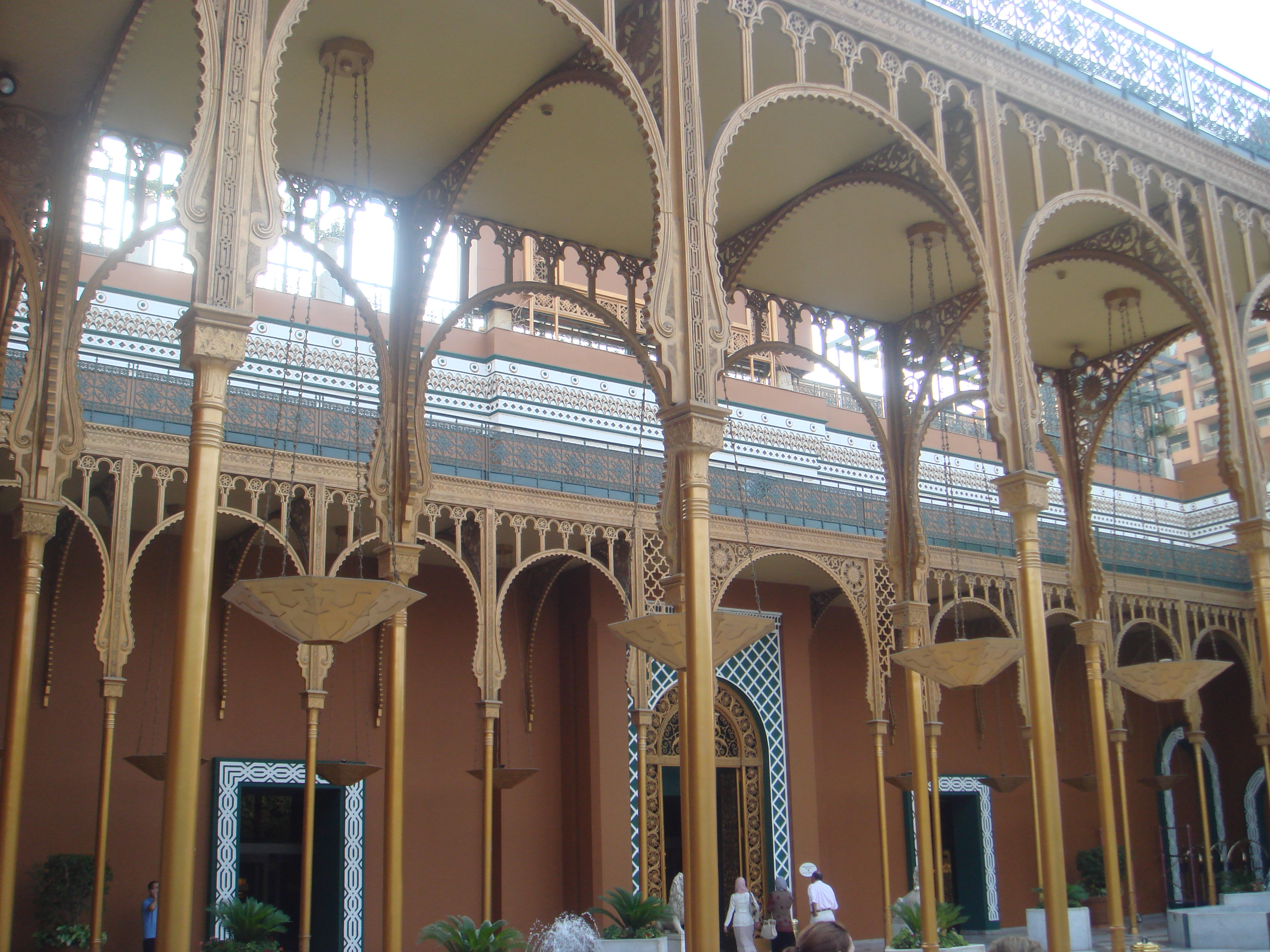
- The front entrance of the Cairo Marriott Hotel

General information
- Location: Cairo, Egypt
- Opening: 1982
- Owner: Legacy Hotels
- Operator: Marriott International

Technical details
- Floor count: 19

Other information
- Number of rooms: 1,087

Website
- www.cairomarriotthotel.com

The Cairo Marriott Hotel is a large hotel located in the Zamalek district of Gezira Island in Egypt and is just west of Downtown Cairo. It is one of the tallest buildings in Cairo. The Marriott opened in 1982, but its central wing was built as the Gezirah Palace for the Khedive Isma'il Pasha in 1869 and converted to a luxury hotel in 1894.

== Hotel ==
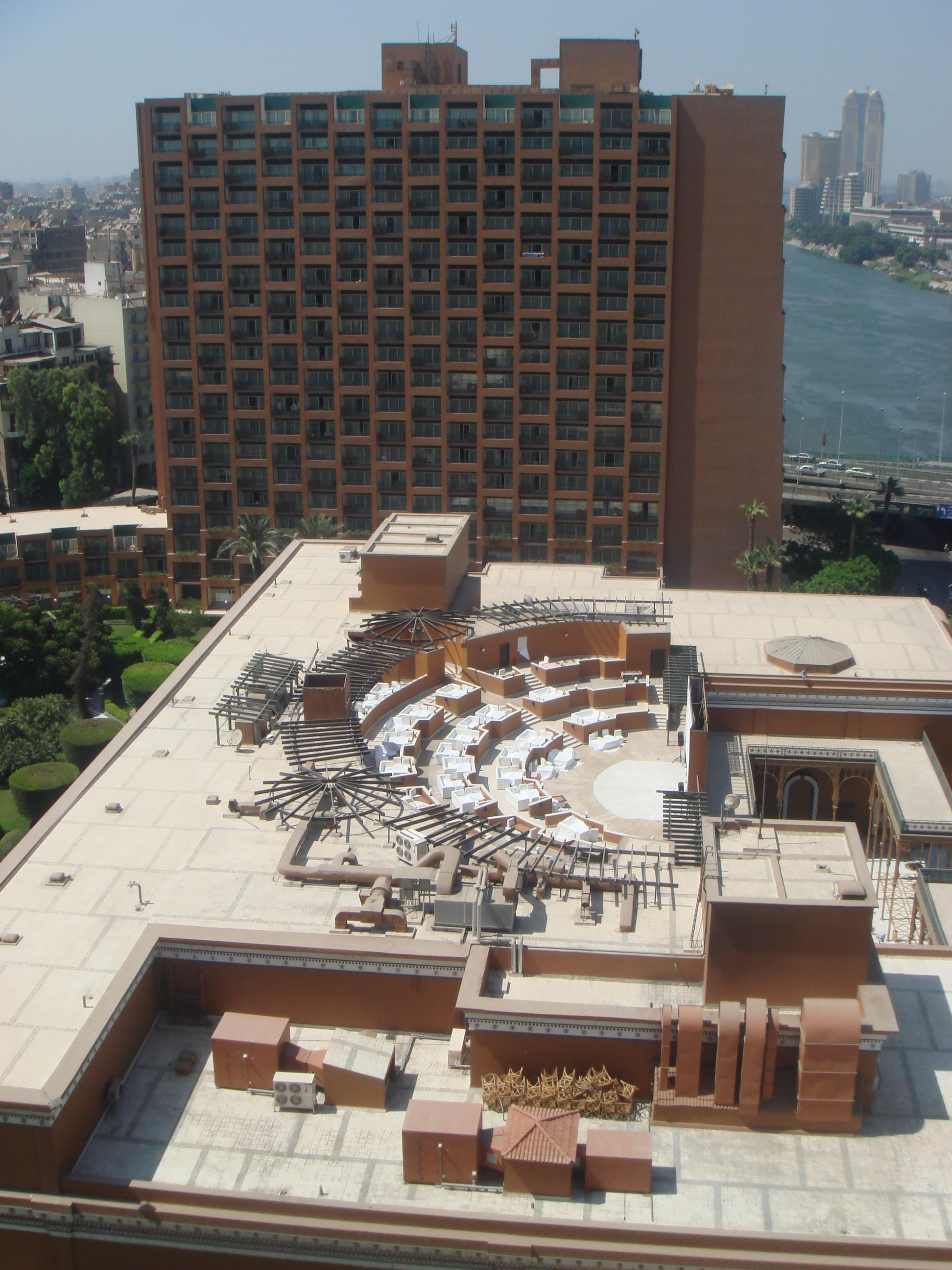
Zamelek Tower and the open-air theatre from Gezira Tower

The hotel consists of 1,087 rooms, making it one of the largest hotels in the Middle East. The rooms are located in two identical twenty-story buildings—the Gezira and Zamelek Towers. Situated between them on ground level is the palace and main entrance to the hotel, which—after reconstruction—now contains the reception and administration areas. On the roof of the palace is an open-air theatre which faces the Nile and central Cairo. The hotel is also used for meetings and events; it has 19 meeting rooms and event venues that total more than 28,000 sq ft of space. The hotel also features a casino.

== History ==
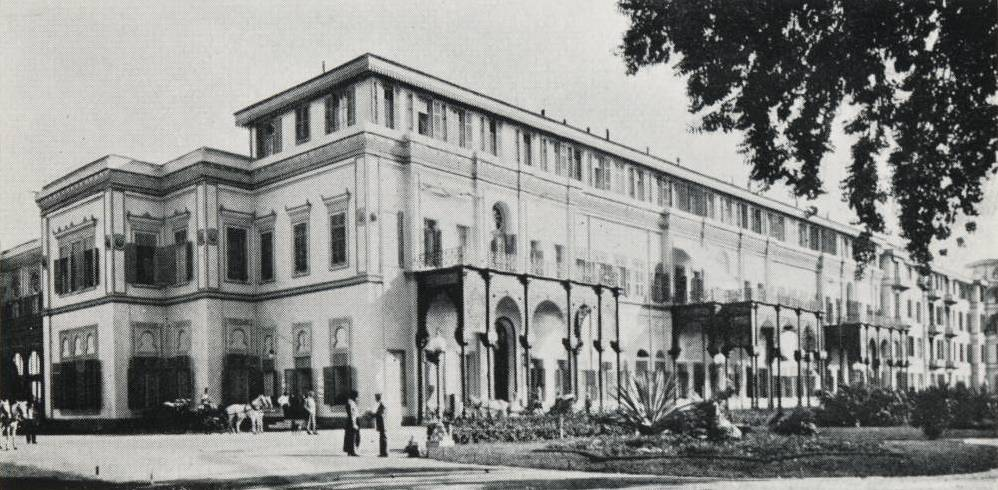
The Ghezireh Palace Hotel - 1906

The Gezirah Palace was commissioned by Khedive Ismail and designed by Carl von Diebitsch to host French Emperor Napoleon III and his wife Empress Eugénie during the celebration of the opening of the Suez Canal in 1869. Ismail asked the architect to make it resemble the Palace of Versailles. In 1880, the palace was seized by Ismail's creditors. It was eventually leased to the Compagnie Internationale des Grands Hotels, who opened it as The Ghezireh Palace Hotel in October 1894. During World War I, the hotel served as the No.2 Australian General Hospital, after the Mena House was unable to cope with the huge number of casualties from the Battle of Gallipoli. In 1919, The Ghezireh Palace Hotel was sold to Syrian businessman Habib Lotfallah and converted back to a private residence. The palace was nationalized by Gamal Abdel Nasser in 1952 and eventually converted back to a hotel, reopening in 1962 as the Omar Khayyam Hotel. In the late 1970s, the two large towers were added and the entire hotel was completely rebuilt. President Hosni Mubarak presided over the grand reopening in 1982 as the Cairo Marriott Hotel. In 20 December 2023, Icon Company, a subsidiary of Talaat Moustafa Group, acquired 51% of Legacy Hotels Company, which owns the hotel.

== See also ==
- List of tallest buildings in Cairo
- List of largest hotels in the world
