= Zamalek =

Urban district in Cairo, Egypt

Coordinates: 30°04′N 31°13′E

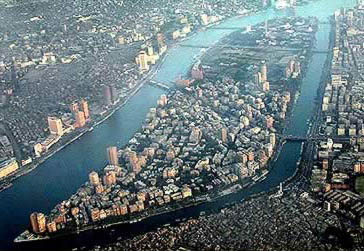
Aerial view looking south, with the Zamalek and Gezira districts on Gezira Island, surrounded by the Nile.

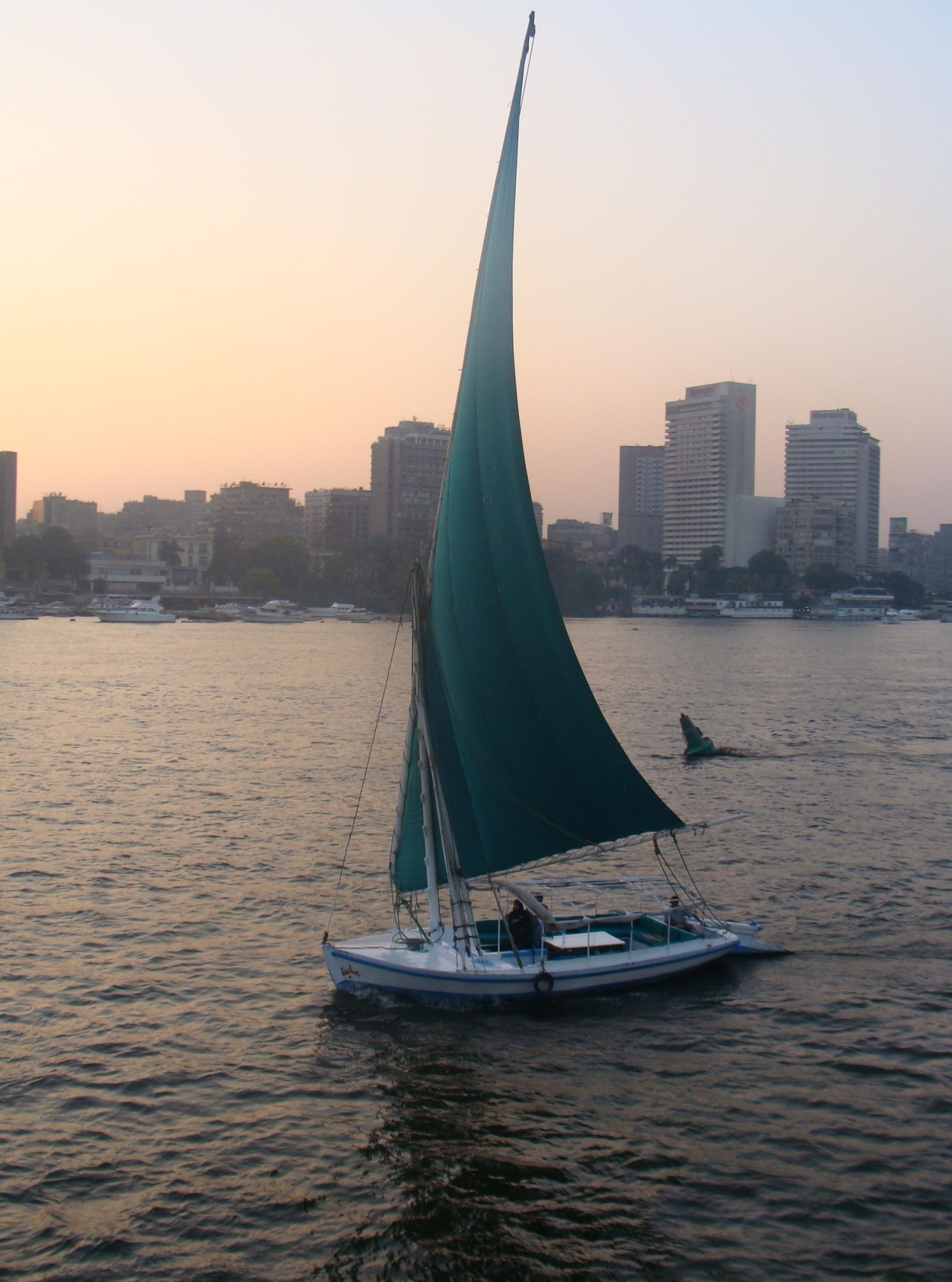
A boat on the Nile in the Zamalek area.

Zamalek (Arabic: الزمالك, romanized: az-Zamālik, pronounced [ez.zæˈmæːlek]) is a qism (ward) within the West District (hayy gharb) in the Western Area of Cairo, Egypt. It is an affluent district on a man-made island which is geologically a part of the west bank of the Nile River, with the bahr al-a'ma (Blind Canal) cut during the second half of the 19th Century to separate it from the west bank proper. The northern third has been developed into a residential area. The southern two thirds are mostly sports grounds and public gardens, a stark green reserve in the middle of Cairo. The island is connected with the river banks by four bridges: The Qasr El Nil Bridge, Galaa Bridge, 15 May Bridge and 6th October Bridge.

== Description ==
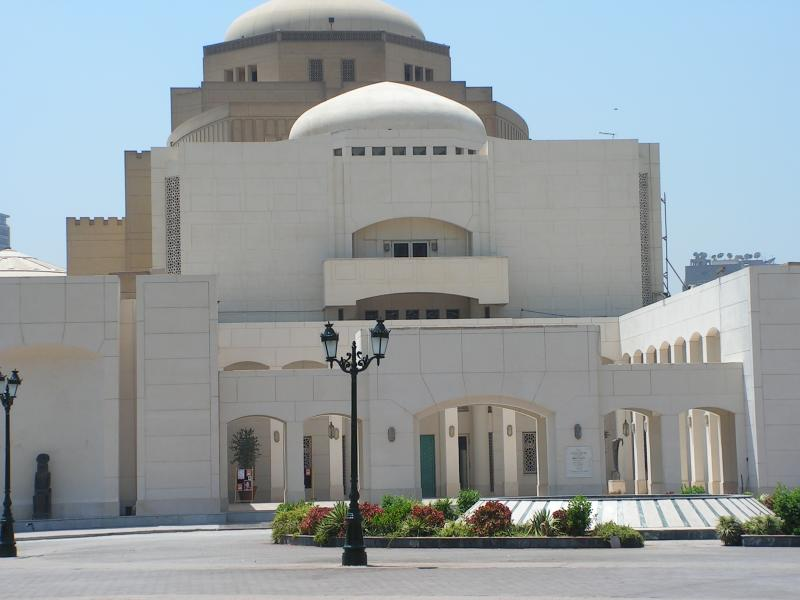
Gezira Island is home to the Cairo Opera House.

The island is divided into a northern third that is fully urbanised, and generally referred to as Zamalek, same as the official qism name covering the entire island from 1983. And the southern, green two thirds that have sports grounds, parks and a cultural district, and is still colloquially referred to as Gezira (lit. island in Arabic), the original name of the island as is reflected in the names of many institutions there, for example the Gezira Sporting Club, Sofitel Cairo Nile El-Gezira Hotel, and the Gezira Police Station.

=== Zamalek (Northern part) ===
The Zamalek portion of the island is a mixed residential and administrative neighbourhood that is almost a diplomatic quarter with at least 52 embassies and consulates, in addition to a number of ambassadors' residences taking up what is left of its early 20th Century villas and mansions, many of them of the Art Deco style. Along with Maadi, Mohandessin, Heliopolis, and Garden City, it is one of the more affluent residential districts in Greater Cairo, a fact reflected by clocking the highest average real estate prices in the city.

Paradoxically, many apartment buildings suffer sporadic maintenance because the landlords rarely make improvements; the rent control law (Old Rent) that allows several Zamalek complexes to house low income and middle income Egyptians despite the expensive real estate.

The northern third of the island is also culturally active: with art galleries, book stores and museums, including the Museum of Islamic Ceramics, the Aisha Fahmy Palace/ Zamalek Arts Center, and El Sawy Culture Wheel. Cairo's main Fine Arts faculty is in Zamalek, as well as the Conservatoire music college. Zamalek's first major building, the 1869 Gezira Palace, still survives though as part of a hotel, and its former grotto is now the fish-free Aquarium Grotto Garden.

=== Gezira (Southern part) ===
The southern two thirds of Zamalek is a mostly green area with sports grounds, parks and a cultural district. Dominating the middle is the originally colonial Gezira Sporting Club, while in the middle of its horse race course is the post-independence Gezira Youth Center. Zamalek is also home to the famous top league Ahly Sporting Club, and the Equestrian Club.

A former fair grounds located near the Qasr al-Nil and Galaa bridges has been converted over time into a cultural district where the central attraction is the modern Cairo Opera House. Others are the Modern Egyptian Art Museum, the Gezira Art Museum (arts collection from the former royal family), Arts Palace, the Hanager Arts Center, the Music Library, and the Cairo Planetarium, though long disused. Opposite the grounds is the Ramses Wissa Wassef designed Mukhtar Museum.

== History ==
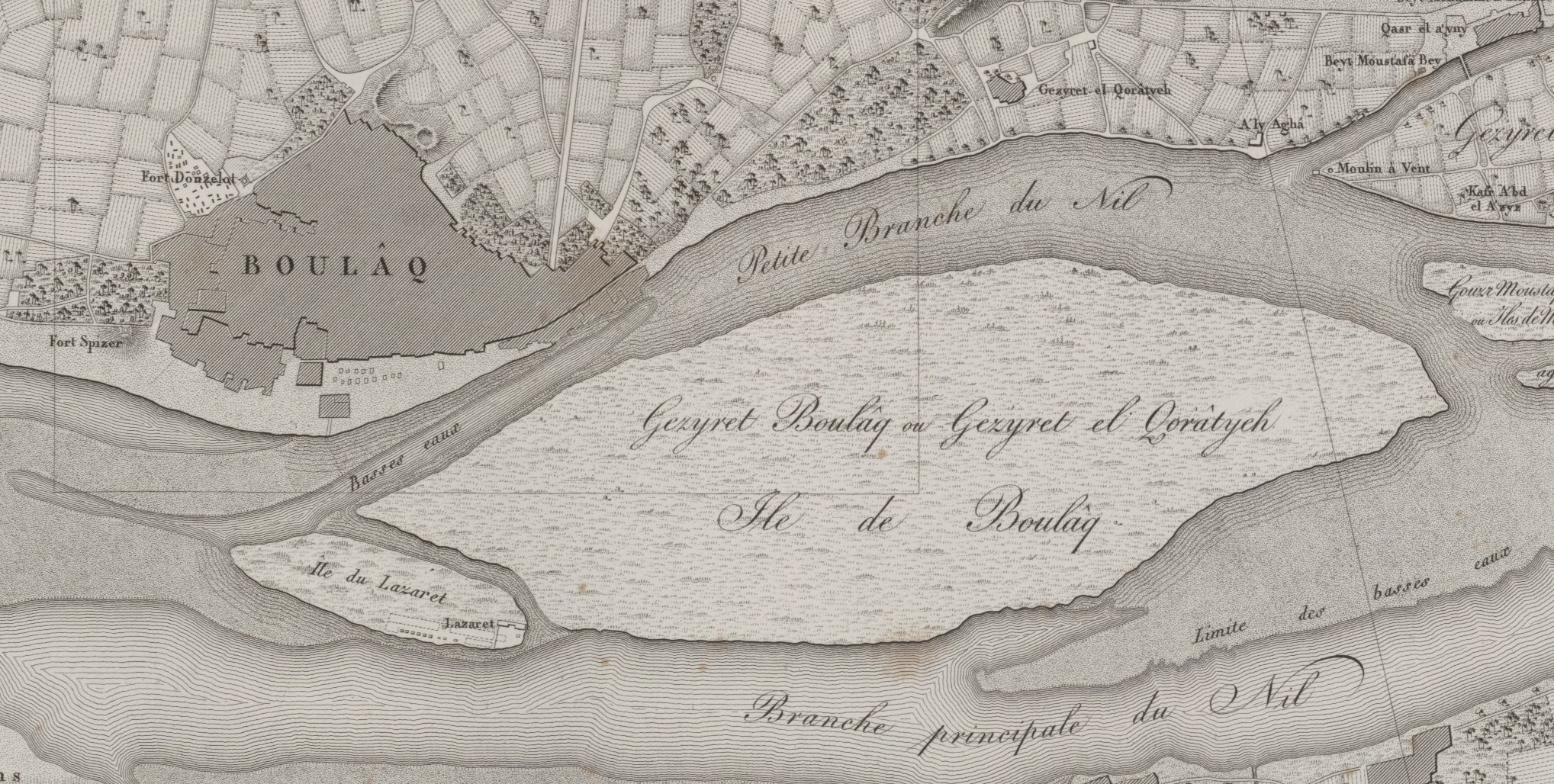
Bulaq and Zamalek (undeveloped, and labeled as "Bulaq Island"), in the c.1800 Description de l'Égypte

Under Khedive Ismail the Island was called "Jardin des Plantes" (Garden of Plants), because of its great collection of exotic plants shipped from all over the world. French landscape designer De la Chevalerie designed the island's landscape plan, gardens, and plant nurseries. On the east shore a kiosk was built for attending the island and supervising its development. Although the area is known as "Gezira Island", this is an unknown nomenclature for those living in Cairo and adjacent areas, most Egyptians know the area simply as "Zamalek".

The kiosk was replaced in 1869 with the Gezirah Palace, a U-shaped summer mansion, which was designed by Julius Franz Pasha and decorated by Carl von Diebitsch. The palace was built and first used for guests attending the 1869 opening of the Suez Canal. Emperor Franz Josef I of Austria and Eugénie, Empress of the French were some of the noble guests of the palace. Today the Gezira Palace is the central part of the Cairo Marriott Hotel, with its rooftop having an open-air theatre facing the Nile.

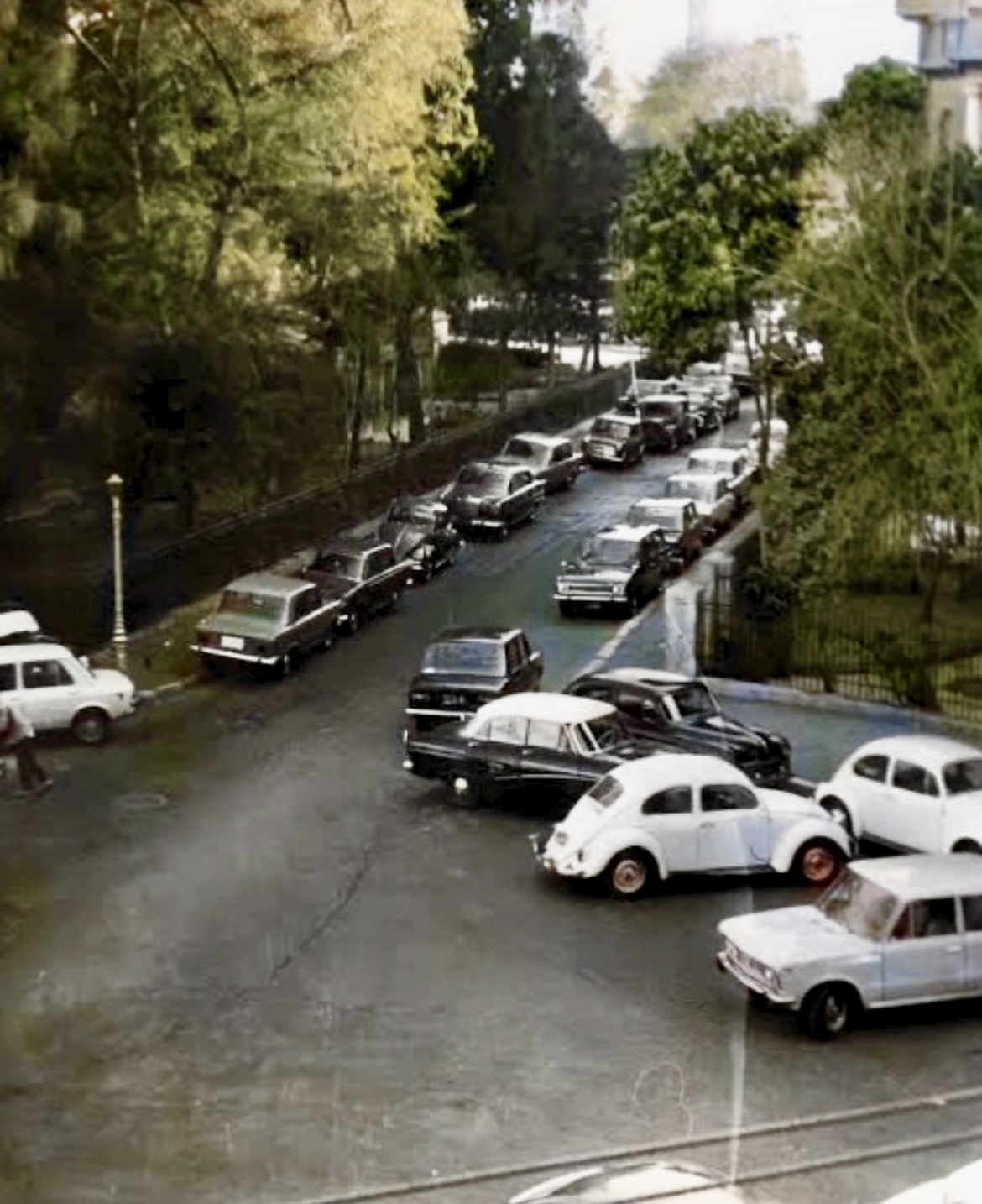
A street in Zamalek, 1972

Other palaces were also built in Zamalek, including Prince of the Sa'id Toussoun's palace, which is now a branch of the Council of Ministers, and Prince Amr Ibrahim Palace (1924), which is now the Museum of Islamic Ceramics. In 1882 the Gezira Sporting Club was built in the southern region of the island. Later a water garden known as the "Grotto Garden", with a rare collection of African fish, was built by British Captain Stanley Flower in Zamalek.

Several notable Egyptian figures lived in Zamalek including the Diva of the East Umm Kulthum and the famous movie star Salah Zulfikar.

== Administrative subdivisions and population ==
The 2017 census counted 14,946 residents in the island's four shiakhas.

Shiakha	Code 2017	Population
'Umar Khayyâm, al- (Omar Khayyam)	011803	1,392
Abû-l-Fidâ	011801	5,513
Jabalâya, al-	011802	2,992
Muḥammad Maẓhar	011804	5,049

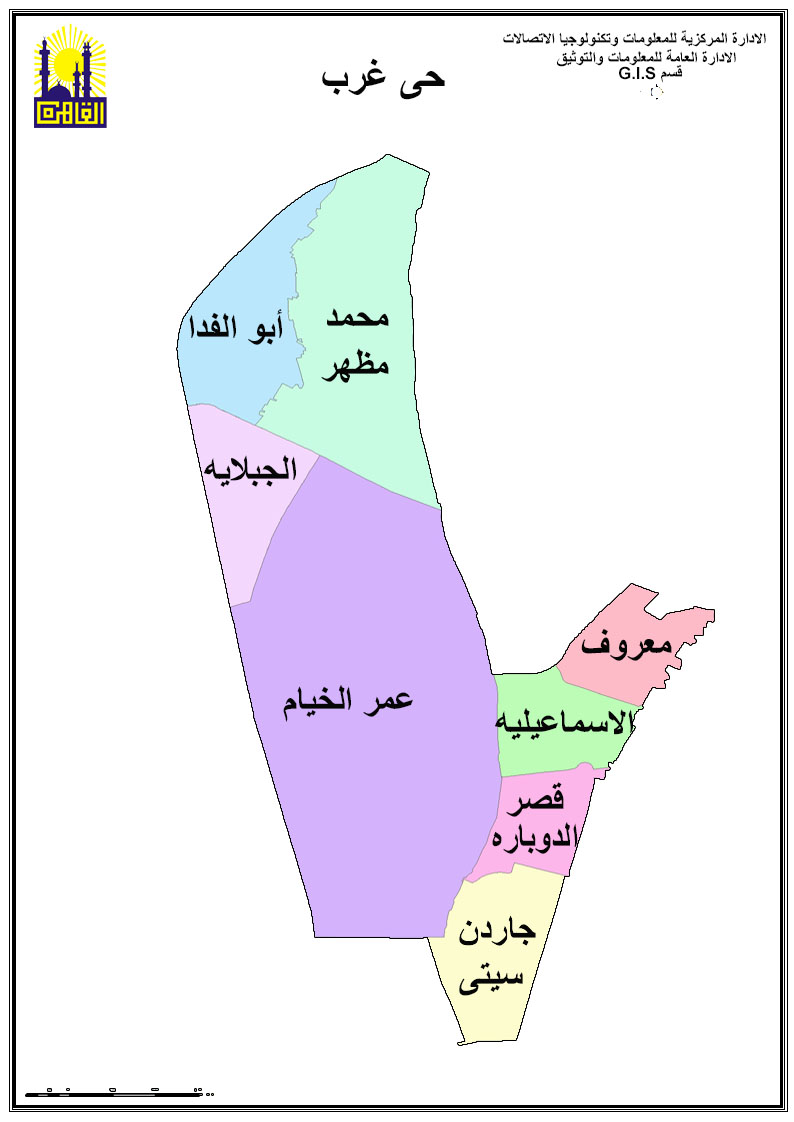
District map of the West District (Hayy Gharb), showing qism Zamalek's four shiakhas, in addition to qism Qasr al-Nil

== Landmarks ==
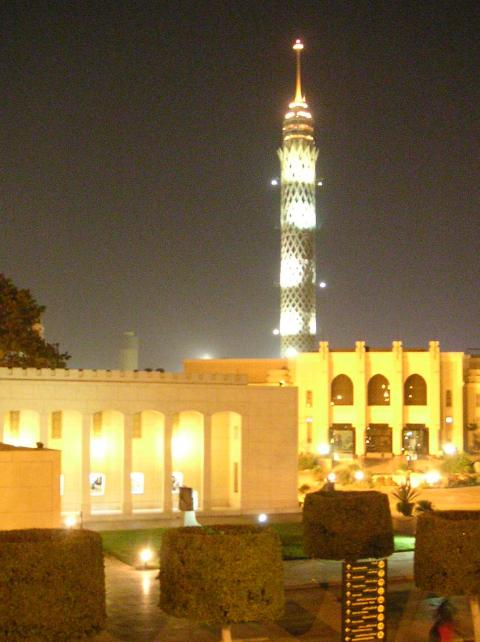
The Cairo Tower and Opera Square at night.

- Al Ahly SC (1907), the most successful sporting club in Egypt.
- Gezira Sporting Club (1882), the oldest club in Egypt.
- Cairo Tower (1960), the tallest concrete construction in Egypt, built near the Gezira Sporting Club.
- Egyptian Opera House (1988), built near the Cairo Tower, and one of the better performing arts venues in the Middle East.
- El Sawy Culture Wheel Centre (2003), (Arabic: ساقية الصاوى) located beneath 15 May Bridge in Zamalek, one of the most important cultural venues in Egypt.
- Museum of Islamic Ceramics
- Faculty of Fine Arts (1908)
- All Saints' Cathedral, Cairo
- Gezirah House, Omarah El Yamani, Oldest Building in Zamalek

== Education ==
International schools:

- Lycée Français du Caire Zamalek Primary Campus
- Pakistan International School of Cairo
- Previously, the British International School in Cairo (BISC)

== Embassies ==
There is a number of embassies in Zamalek:

- Albania
- Algeria
- Argentina
- Armenia
- Austria
- Bahrain
- Brazil
- Bulgaria
- Chile
- China
- Colombia
- Croatia
- Cyprus
- Democratic Republic of the Congo
- Estonia
- Finland
- Germany
- (Vatican City) Holy See
- Hungary
- India
- Iraq
- (Republic of Ireland) Ireland
- Latvia
- Lebanon
- Libya
- Lithuania
- Morocco
- Myanmar
- Nepal
- Netherlands
- Nigeria
- North Korea
- Norway
- Oman
- Panama
- Poland
- Portugal
- Romania
- Serbia
- Spain
- Sri Lanka
- Sweden
- Tunisia
- Uruguay
- Vietnam

== See also ==
- Gezira Island
- Cairo Eye
