= Gezirah Palace =

Palace in Cairo, Egypt

Coordinates: 30°03′26″N 31°13′30″E

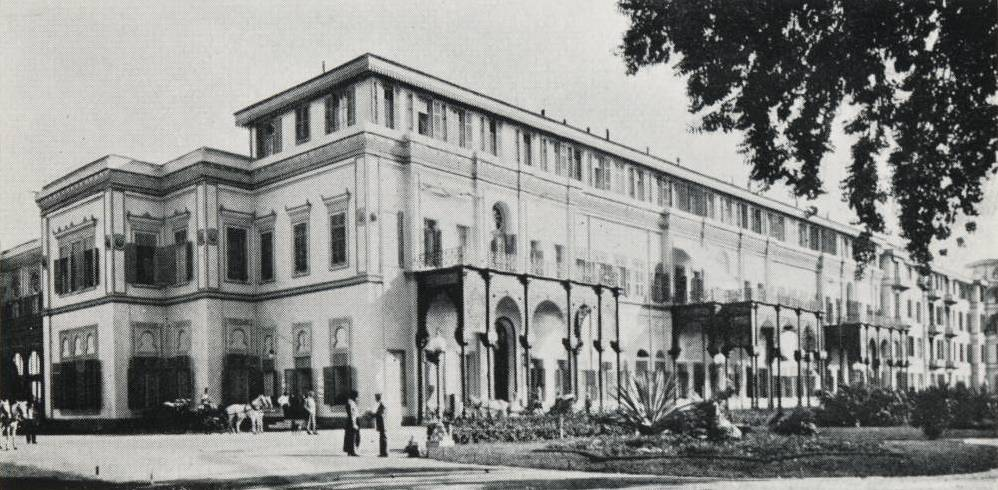
Ghezireh Palace, Zamalek district, Gezira Island, Cairo (1906 - as Hotel)

The Gezirah Palace (Arabic: قصر الجزيرة) was one of the Egyptian royal palaces of the Muhammad Ali Dynasty. It is located in the Zamalek district on Gezira Island in the Nile, just west of Downtown Cairo.

== History ==
The Gezirah Palace, designed c. 1868, was commissioned by Khedive Ismail for entertaining visiting international dignitaries during the opening of the Suez Canal in 1869.

At the palace's opening ceremony, guests saw the first performance of Giuseppe Verdi's opera Aida, commissioned for the opening of the Suez Canal.

Ismail Pasha fell into debt and sold the Palace ten years after its construction to Michel Lutfallah who turned it into his private residence. The palace was known during that period as the Lutfallah Palace.

During the Veiled British Protectorate, the palace was sold to Paul Draneht and Commander Oblieght in 1889, and converted by the Compagnie Internationale des Grands Hotels into The Ghezireh Palace Hotel in October 1894. During World War I it was put into service as the No.2 Australian General Hospital, after the Mena House was unable to cope with the huge number of casualties from the Battle of Gallipoli.

== Architecture ==
The Gezira Palace is a neoclassical structure with an alhambresque style used for interior decorations, the portico façade, and a monumental garden pavilion. The landscaped gardens surrounding the palace included a zoo.

Renowned European architects were commissioned for the project: Julius Franz of Germany designed the palace, Owen Jones of Britain did the interiors, and Carl von Diebitsch of Prussia designed the portico and the garden pavilion.

== Present day ==
The Gezirah Palace is currently the central part of the Cairo Marriott Hotel complex, between the hotel's pair of towers, on Gezira Island north of the 6th October Bridge.

== Gallery ==
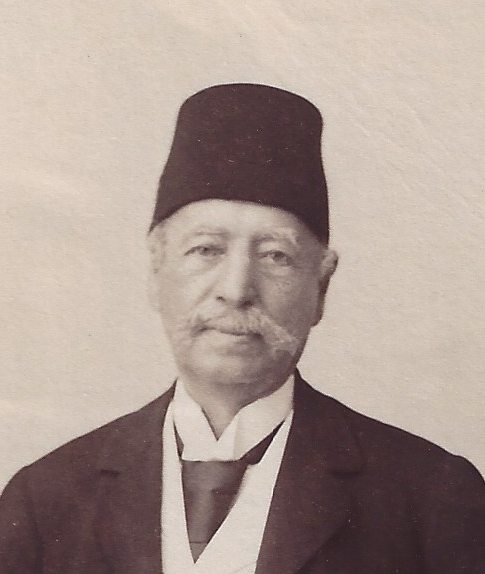
Draneht Pasha

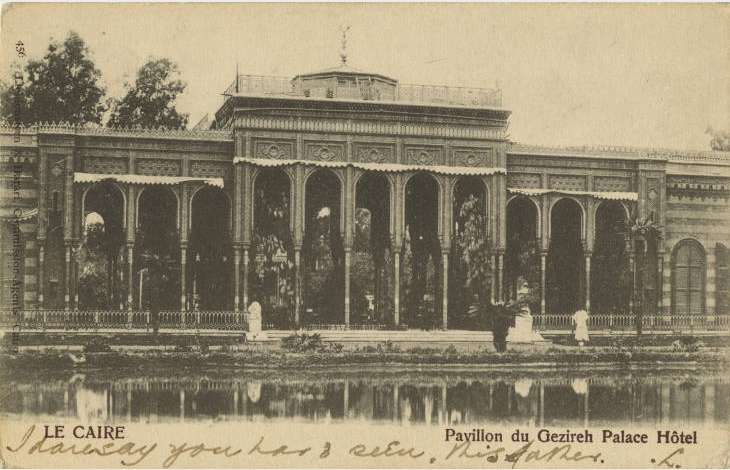
Pavilion du Gezirah Palace Hôtel

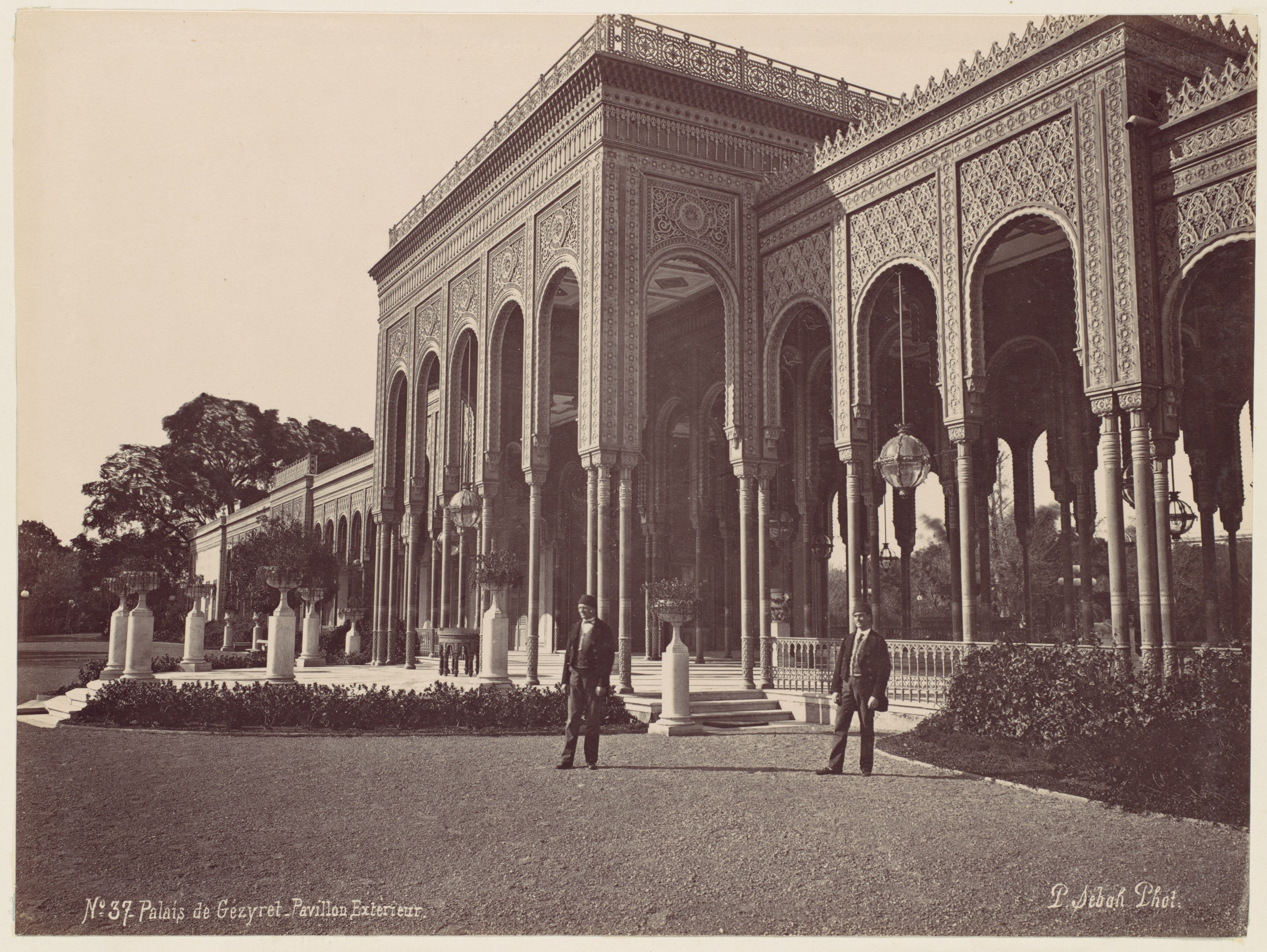
The alhambresque exterior pavilion designed by Carl Von Diebitsch.
