= Prince Amr Ibrahim Palace =

Historic building in Egypt and museum (established 1921)

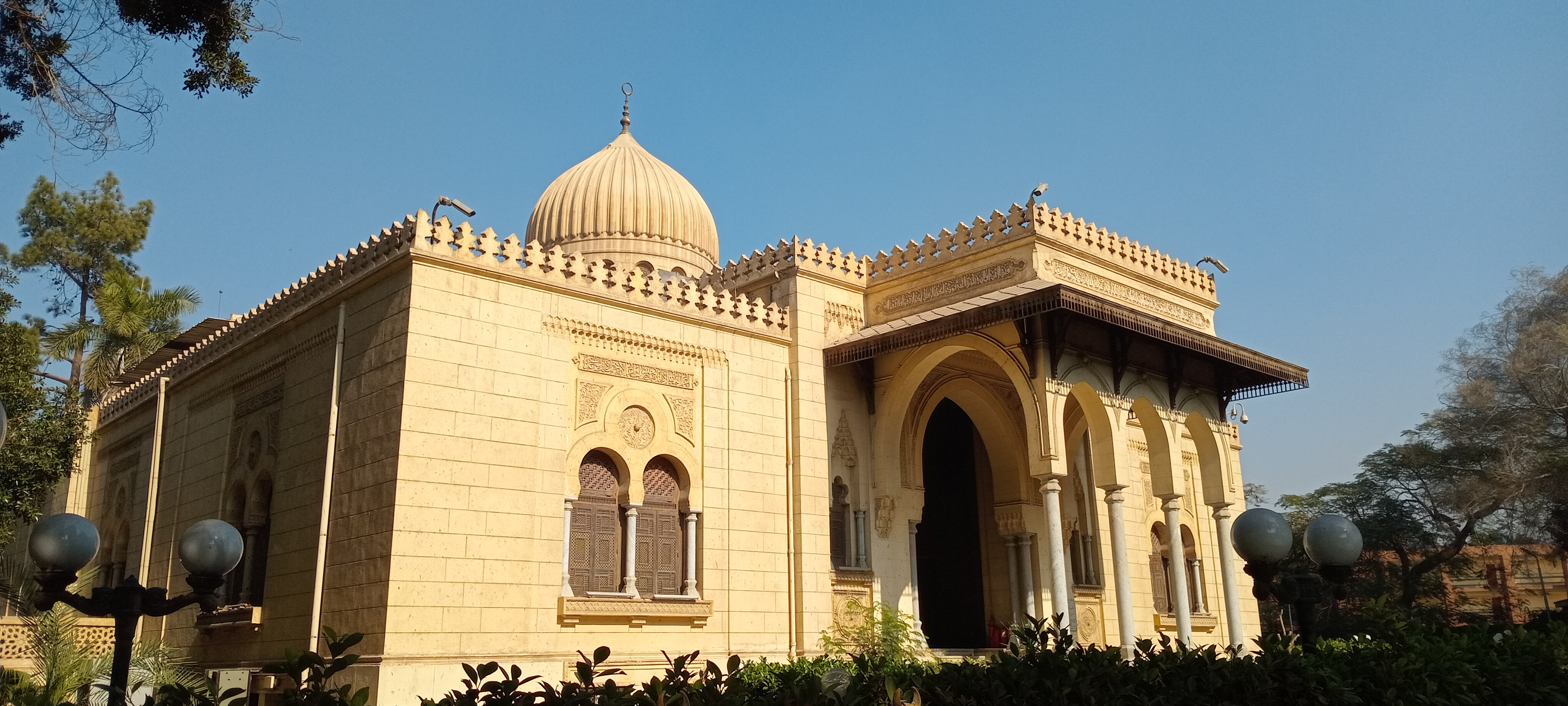
- Entrance to the Islamic Ceramic Museum

General information
- Architectural style: Neo-Ottoman
- Location: Zamalek, Egypt
- Coordinates: 30.0552°N 31.2257°E
- Completed: 1921; 105 years ago
- Cost: €200 million (US$257 million)
- Client: Prince Amr Ibrahim

Technical details
- Size: 850 square meters

Design and construction
- Architect: Garo Balyan

The Prince Amr Ibrahim Palace is a historical building in Cairo's Zamalek island, which is used as the Egypt's first ceramics museum, the Museum of Islamic Ceramics and as an art center.

== History and location ==
The palace is located in the Gezira area, an island in the Nile, of Zamalek in Cairo. It was built on the orders of Prince Amr Ibrahim (1903–1977), member of the Muhammad Ali dynasty, in 1921. Prince Amr Ibrahim was the husband of Necla Sultan, granddaughter of Ottoman ruler Mehmed VI, also known as Vahideddin. The architect of the building was Garo Balyan, the youngest member of the Balyan family. The cost of the construction was about 200 million euros ($257 million).

The palace was used by Prince Amr Ibrahim and his wife, Necla Sultan, as a summer residence.

== Style and layout ==
The architectural style of the palace is neo-Ottoman and neo-Islamic. It also reflects dominant styles of the Muhammad Ali dynasty in terms of its architectural and decorative style. There are also Moroccan and Andalusian influences in the architecture of the palace.

Total area of the building is 850 square meters. It is made of a basement and two floors. In the entrance hall there is a marble fountain decorated with blue ceramics. The palace is surrounded by a 2,800 square meter garden.

== Use ==
The palace became a state property on 9 November 1953 following the 1952 coup d'etat in Egypt. It was first employed as a club by the Arab Socialist Union until 1971. From 1971 the building was employed by the Ministry of Culture as an exhibition gallery for paintings endowed by former Prime Minister Mohammed Mahmoud Khalil.

In 1998 the building was renovated by the Egyptian architect Aly Raafat and became home to the Museum of Islamic Ceramics in February 1999. The Museum was reopened after further extensive renovations in October 2024. Entree to the palace and museum is free of charge.

== Museum of Islamic Ceramics ==
The museum collections are organized by time periods and place of origin: upon entering the palace, the foyer with a fountain of colored marble in its center, opens to the Fatimid era collection to the right and to the Turkish hall to the left. Both rooms have functional fireplaces made with ceramic tilework and in the typical conical shape from Turkey^{,}.

The former dining room, now housing the collection of ceramics from the Fatimid era also contains precious carved wooden furniture with mother of pearl inlays. To the left of the foyer, the room hosting the Turkish ceramics leads to another room displaying representative ceramics made in Egypt during the Ayoubi, Mamluk, Osmani and Umayyad periods.

The upper floor display is organized in the gallery around the dome for Iranian collections and other rare pieces of miscellaneous origin, such as Tunisian Qallaline ceramic tiles. The first floor consisted of a private bathroom for the Prince with a cold and warm water system imported from Italy, a small apartment now housing 12th and 13th century Syrian ceramics from Raqqa, and a changing room with an entire wall closet closed by wooden panels decorated with mother of pearl inlays.

== Gallery ==
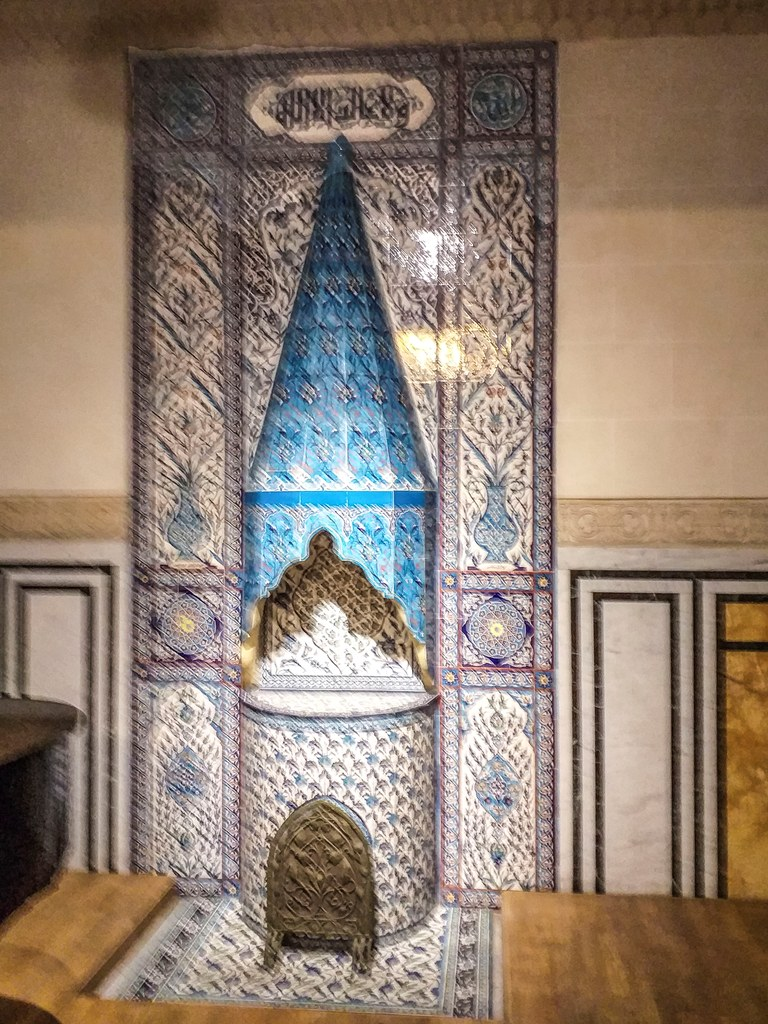
Functional fireplaces made with ceramic tilework in conical shape from Turkey 19th c.

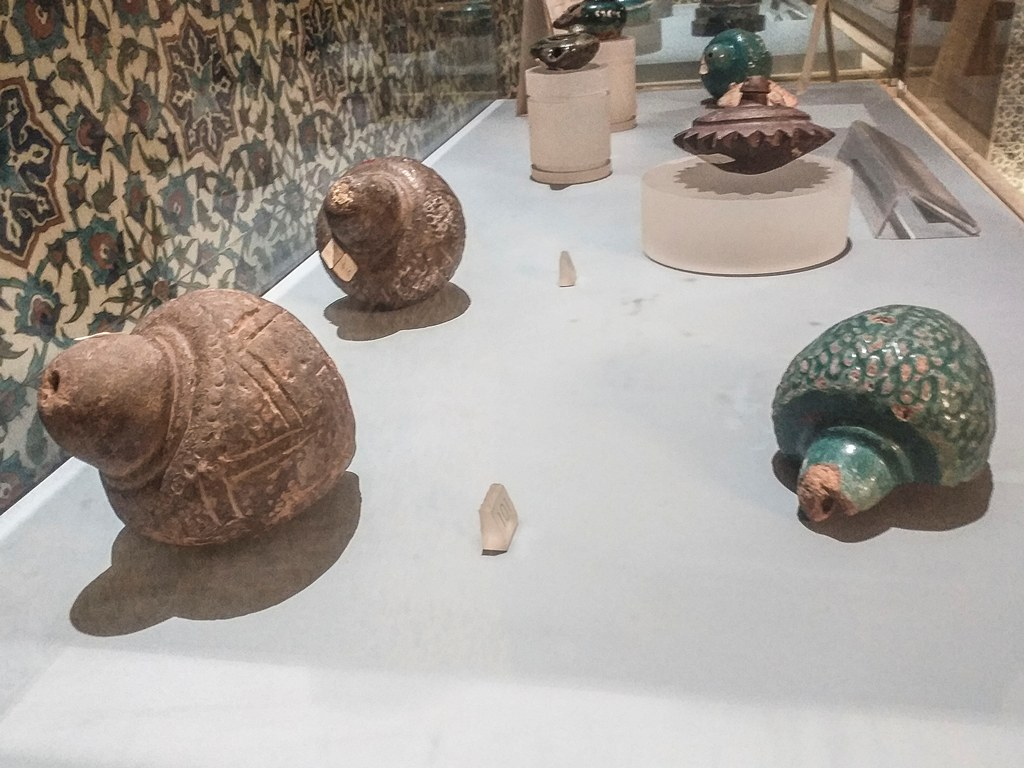
Hand grenades Egypt, Fatimid 11th c.

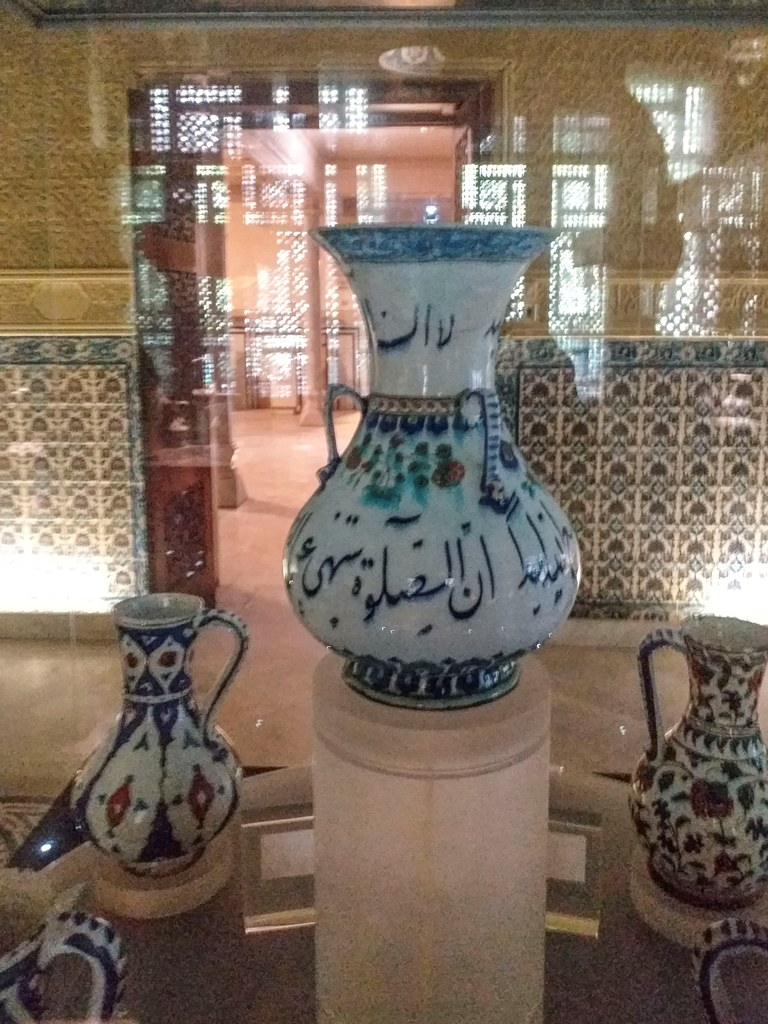
Jug - Turkey 17th c.

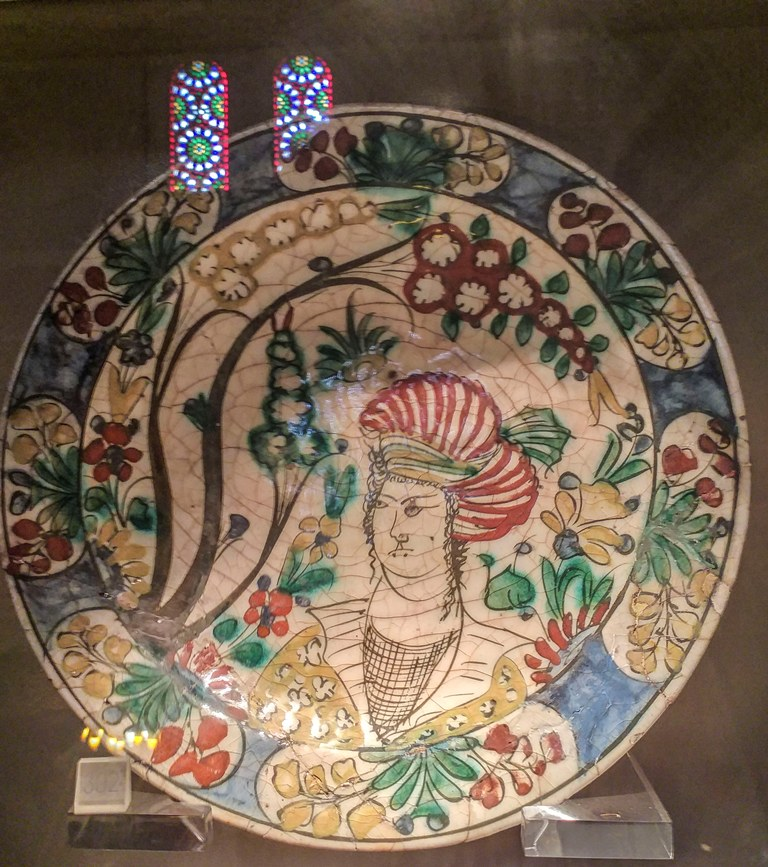
Persian plate

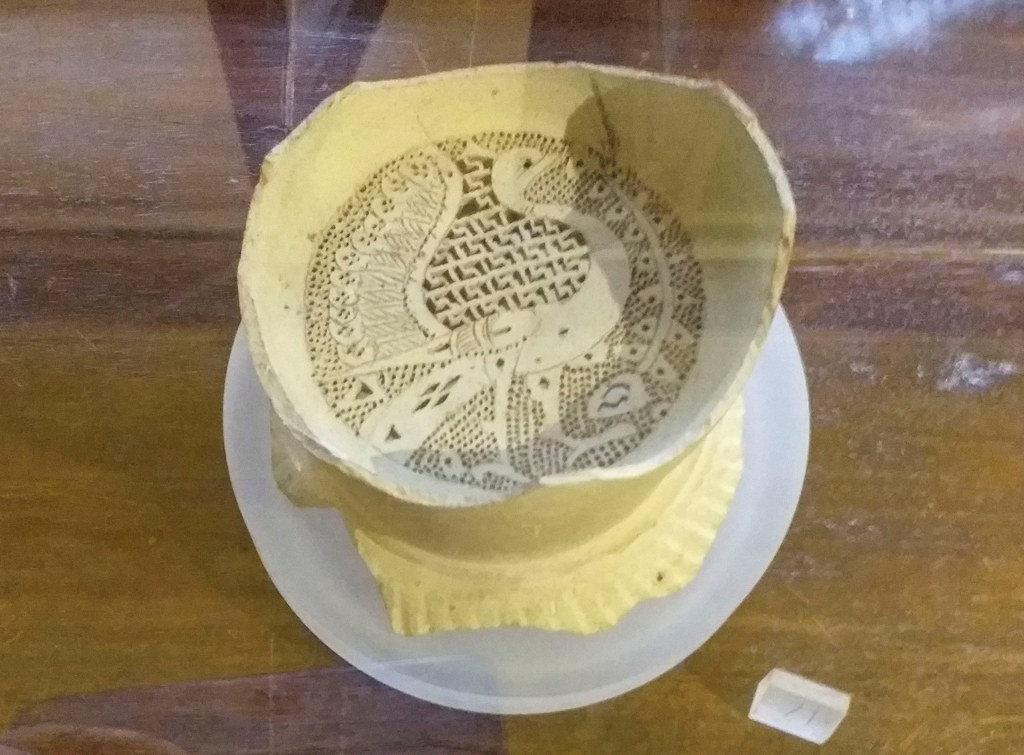
Water jug filter, Egypt, Fatimid 11th c.
