= Cairo Eye =

Ferris wheel in Egypt

- عين القاهرة
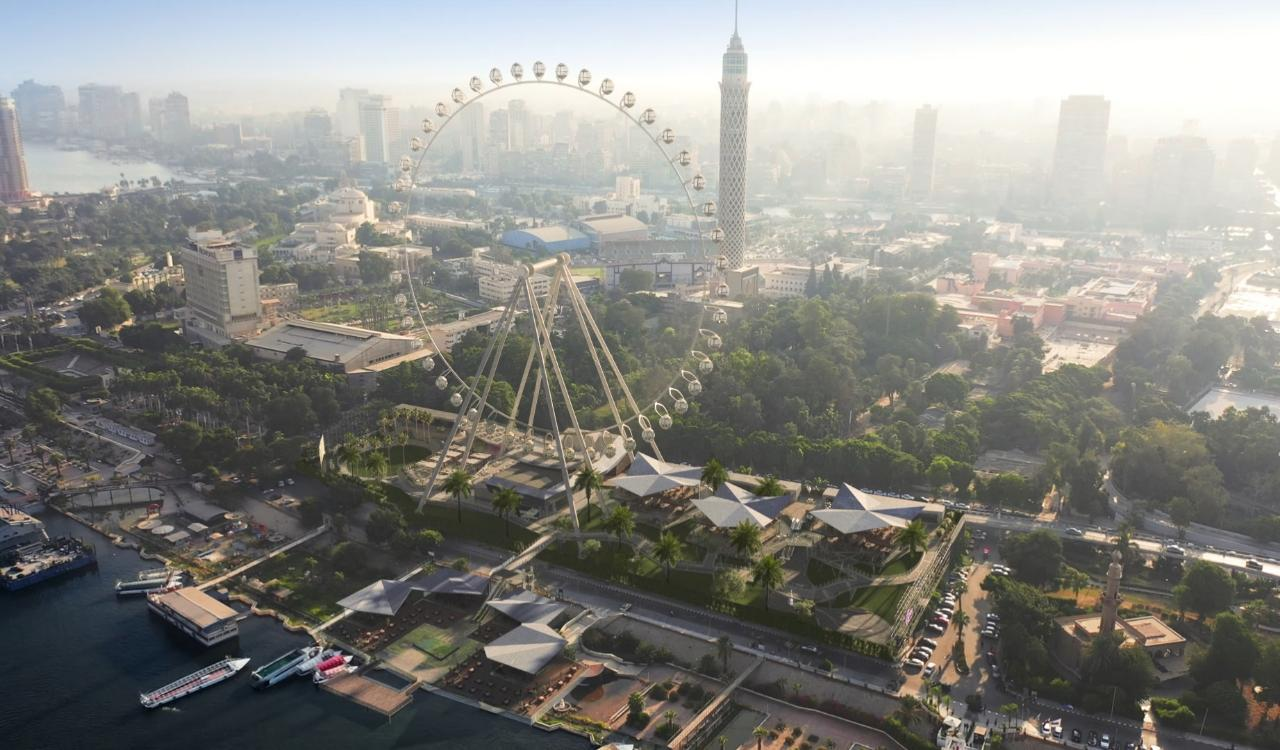
- Alternative names: Ain Cairo

General information
- Status: Under construction
- Type: Ferris wheel
- Location: Cairo, Egypt, Zamalek
- Construction started: January 21st, 2021
- Completed: Not completed
- Cost: EGP 500 million ($32 million)
- Owner: Hawaii Tourism

Height
- Height: 120 meters (390 ft)

Technical details
- Floor area: 5000 square metres (54,000 sq ft)

Other information
- Parking: 500 vehicles

Cairo Eye, also known as Ain Cairo (Arabic: عين القاهرة) is a ferris wheel under construction located on the banks of the Nile River in the Zamalek district of Cairo, Egypt.

It will be considered Cairo's first recreational and touristic observation wheel spanning over 5,000 square metres (54,000 ft^{2}) of land area and a height of 120 metres (390 ft), making it the largest ferris wheel in Africa and the fifth largest worldwide, expected to attract around 2.5 million visitors a year.

In recent years, the adjacent city of Giza, which is home to the Giza pyramid complex and the Great Sphinx, has received significant investment in tourism infrastructure. Projects include Grand Egyptian Museum, a new visitor center at the Giza pyramid complex and, Sphinx International Airport, These developments are intended to expand tourism facilities in the Giza area and improve access to major archaeological sites.

In accordance with Egypt's 2030 Vision, Egypt aims to resuscitate its tourism sector with the new tourist attraction. As Egypt's tourism authority anticipates that the wheel will certainly boost Egypt's economy, especially after the effects of the coronavirus pandemic.

The project was set to be completed in 2022, but it seems to have been abandoned.

== Facilities ==
Cairo Eye is placed near one of Cairo's major archaeological attractions, the Cairo Tower, and it aims to link both entertainment and cultural learning together, set to have an integrated recreational area established around the Ferris wheel to serve as a tourist destination.

The wheel will have 48 total cabins with a panoramic 360 view of Cairo with a capacity of 6-8 passengers for each cabin, and will carry around 15,000 visitors a day. The height of the wheel is 120 metres (390 ft), offers a bird's-eye view of the city for up to 50 kilometres (31 mi) which includes the views of downtown Cairo, the renowned Great Pyramid of Giza and the Sphinx.

The Cairo Eye will also include services and facilities like retailers of international brands, fine dining restaurants, a food court, an entertainment and events area as well as a 1,000 square metres (11,000 ft^{2}) multi-purpose hall overlooking the Nile River.

As for the inevitable congestion and traffic jams, the project will be provided with a covered car parking area (two levels) with a capacity of 500 vehicles, 'Ain Cairo taxi services' and 'Ain Cairo free transport drop on/off buses' as well as river transportation.

Tickets to ride the Cairo Eye are expected to range between $15 and $22, but prices will be reviewed once the project is complete.

== Construction ==
The beginning of construction on the Cairo Eye wheel was officially announced by the Governor of Cairo on January 21, 2021, and it comes to support the Egypt Vision 2030 strategy to boost tourism in Egypt and economic development launched by the president of Egypt, Abdel Fattah el-Sisi. The project is owned by Hawaii Tourism, which are in negotiations with 4 banks to finance 50% of the investment cost of the Cairo Eye project.

Cairo Eye was set to be completed and opened in 2022 at a cost of EGP 500 million ($32 million), providing 1,200 direct job opportunities and 4,000 indirect job opportunities.

== Concerns ==
=== Location ===
Zamalek residents have raised concerns over the project's potential impact on the already-crowded district and its infrastructure. In order to preserve the identity and entity of the district, while taking into account the eservation of all trees and palms in the area, the project has adopted a plan to achieve an increase in the total green areas of the project by 15% to reach 7,000 square metres (75,000 ft^{2}) instead of the current 6,100 square metres (66,000 ft^{2}).

Even after Cairo Eye officials stated that the project will actually increase total green space by 15%. Some stakeholders, such as Egyptian billionaire Naguib Sawiris, suggest moving the attraction closer to Egypt's New Administrative Capital, an under-construction local designed to alleviate Cairo congestion.

=== Traffic ===
Cairo is notoriously gridlocked, and many residents and even government officials worry an attraction of this size could only worsen things. Project leaders stated that they have studied traffic management and proposed solutions like the Cairo Eye Nile Taxi, a hop-on-hop-off bus, and a parking garage set to hold up to 500 cars.
