= Carl von Diebitsch =

Prussian architect active in Egypt and Prussia

Carl von Diebitsch (1819–1869) was a Prussian architect from Berlin active in Egypt and Prussia. He is notable for his role in the design of the Gezira Palace for Khedive Isma'il of Egypt.

== Biography ==
He traveled from 1842 to 1848 during his studies, in Rome, Sicily, North Africa, and Spain.

He worked with Julius Franz and Owen Jones on the design of the Gezira Palace for Khedive Isma'il of Egypt, contributing an Alhambresque portico and a monumental garden kiosk.

He designed the Maurischer Kiosk, inspired by the Alhambra which he studied while in Spain, for the Prussian participation in the 1867 Exposition Universelle in Paris.

== Clients and works ==
Client's name	Profession	Religion	Building	Building location
Johann Christian Gentz	Bourgeois in Neuruppin, Brandenburg	Protestant	Turkish Villa Tempelgarten	Nerrupin, Brandenburg, Germany
Carl von Diebitsch	Architect	Protestant	Moorish House	Berlin, Germany
Alexander Gentz, son of Johann Christian Gentz	bourgeois in Neuruppin, Brandenburg	Protestant	Granary of Gentzrode	Near Neuruppin, Brandenburg, Germany
Henry Oppenheim	German banker	Jewish convert to Anglicanism after marrying a British wife	Iron work and interior design of Villa Oppenheim (no longer exists)	Cairo, Egypt
Mohamed Sherif Pasha	Minister of foreign affairs in Egypt	Muslim	Hypostyle and stairway in cast iron (no longer exists)	Cairo, Egypt
Soliman Pasha al-Faransawi	Major General in Egyptian army	French by birth converted to Islam	Mausoleum (still existing)	Cairo, Egypt
Ismaʼil Pasha	Khedive of Egypt	Muslim	Iron work and interior design of palace (still existing) and garden pavilion on Al-Gazira island (no longer exists)	Cairo, Egypt
Nubar Pasha	Egyptian Minister	Armenian Christian	Rebuilding and enlarging the palace of Nubar Pasha (no longer exists)	Cairo, Egypt
Descendant of a Mecca pilgrim		Muslim	Maqsura for a saint in a mosque on the Muqattam hills	Cairo, Egypt
Menshausen	Banker	Protestant	Villa Menshausen (no longer exists)	Alexandria, Egypt
Count Gerbel or Göbel	Aristocrat	Christian	Villa Gerbel or Göbel (no longer exists)	Cairo, Egypt
Bethel Henry Strousberg	Railway magnate	Jewish convert to Anglicanism after marrying a British wife	Moorish pavilion from the 1867 Exposition Universelle, (bought from Diebitsch's wife after his death)	Schloß Zbirow, Bohemia (today in Schloß Linderhof, Bavaria, Germany)
Ludwig II	King of Bavaria	Catholic	Moorish pavilion from the 1867 Exposition Universelle, (bought from Strousberg when he became insolvent)	Schloß Linderhof, Bavaria, Germany
