= Compagnie Internationale des Grands Hotels =

The Compagnie Internationale des Grands Hôtels (CIGH) was founded on 11 April 1894 as a subsidiary of the railway company Compagnie Internationale des Wagons-Lits (CIWL). This hotel chain was established to provide the customers of CIWL with high quality accommodation before or after their train journey.

== History ==
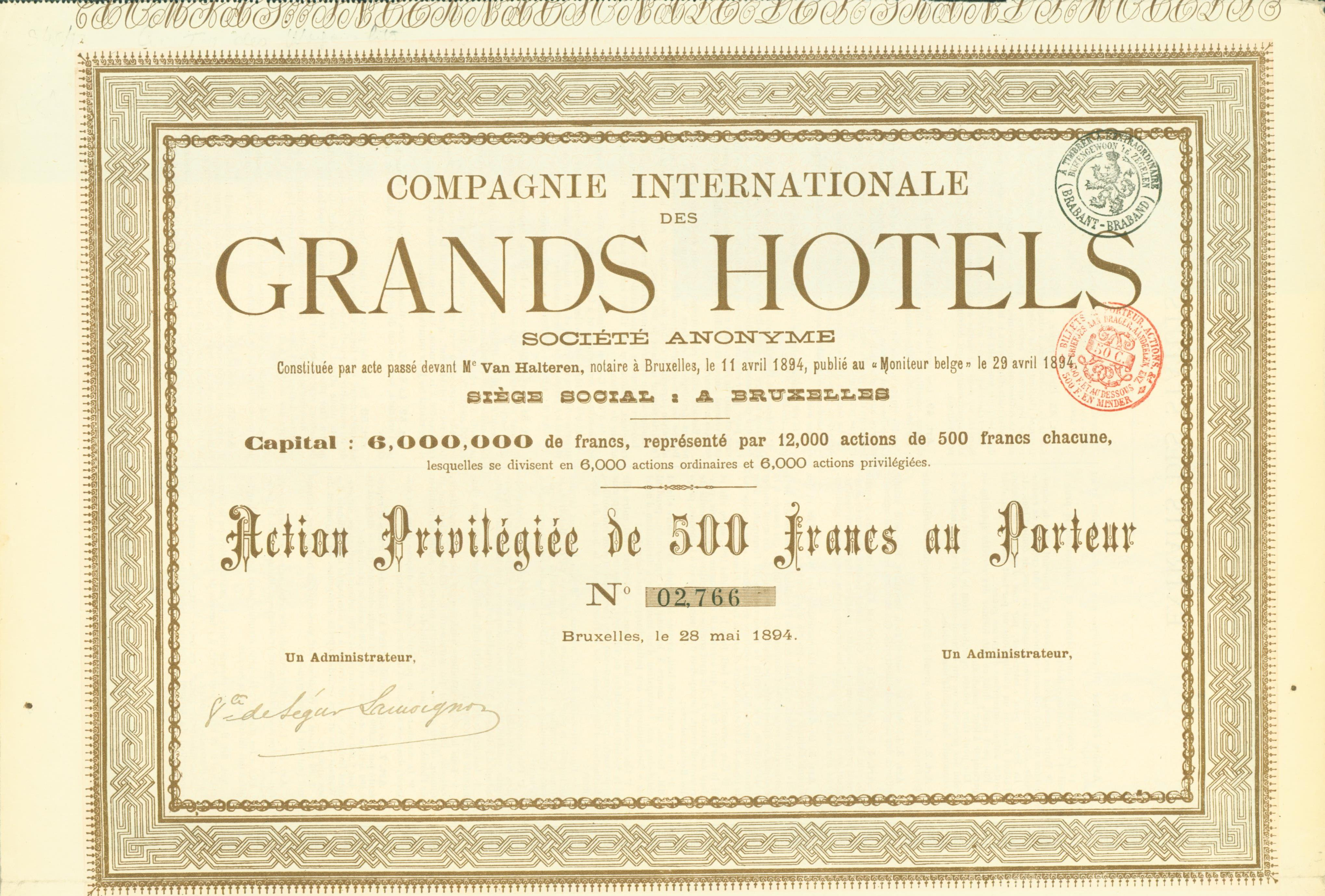
Preferred share of the Comp. Internationale des Grands Hotels, issued 28 Mai 1894

Georges Nagelmackers created the Compagnie Internationale des Grands Hotels to develop and operate luxury hotels throughout its trains' routes. Three hotels already operated by CIWL before 1894 were integrated in the hotel chain.

The CIGH operated most of King Ismail's palaces in Egypt before his abdication in 1879. It then remodeled the Gezirah Palace and opened it in 1894. The CIGH's instant expansion throughout Europe made it the first international hotel chain.

The CIGH had operated successfully for twenty years when World War I heavily affected the hotel business. CIGH had to sell or close many hotels and at the end of World War I only four hotels were operated by CIGH. After World War I, the CIGH wasn't regarded as a core business, and it wasn't until after World War II that the hotel business was revived.

== Properties ==
Details and changes are in the article regarding the hotel.

Hotel	Place	Country	Management by CIGH
Avenida Palace	Lisbon	Portugal	1891
Le Bosphorus Summer Palace	Therapia	Turkey	1894
Buffet de Lyon	Lyon	France	1900
Buffet Terminus	Oran	Algeria	1914
Chateau Royal d'Ardenne	Dinant	Belgium	1900
Elysée Palace	Paris	France	1896
Gezirah Palace	Cairo	Egypt	1894
Grand Hotel des Bains	Cherbourg	France	1901
Grand Hotel International	Brindisi	Italy	1893
Grand Hotel des Wagons-Lits	Beijing	China	1904
Hotels et Bains de Hongrie	Csorba	Hungary	1903
Maloja Palace	Maloja	Switzerland	1895
Pavillon de Bellevue	Meudon	France	1899
Pera Palace	Constantinople	Turkey	1894
Hôtel de la Plage	Ostend	Belgium	1895
Quarnero	Abbazia	Austria	1898
Riviera Palace	Nice	France	1893
Riviera Palace	Monte Carlo (Beausoleil, Alpes-Maritimes)	Monaco	1899
Hôtel Royal Palace	Ostend	Belgium	1899
Shepheard's Hotel	Cairo	Egypt	1897
Hotel Terminus	Bordeaux	France	1897
Hotel Terminus et Buffet	Marseille	France	1900
Hotel Terminus Maritime	Ostend	Belgium	1913
Tunisia Palace	Tunis	Tunisia	1902
Victoria Hotel	Ismailia	Egypt	1898

== See also ==
- Compagnie Internationale des Wagons-Lits
- Georges Nagelmackers
