= Nabq =

Nabq may refer to:

- Nabq Protected Area, a nature reserve in Egypt
- A subdivision of Sharm El Sheikh, Egypt

== See also ==
- Nabqa day, a Palestinian day of commemoration
