= Pamu =

Pamu or PAMU may refer to:

- Pamu, a food brand of Landcorp in New Zealand
- Pamu Pamorada (Annielie Gerez Pamorada, born 1992), Filipina actress and comedian
- Protected Area Management Unit of the Nabq Protected Area in Egypt
- Pan-American Muaythai Union, a member of the International Federation of Muaythai Associations
- Physics and Applied Mathematics Unit of the Indian Statistical Institute

== See also ==
- Parnu (disambiguation)
