= Al-Sahaba Mosque (Sharm el-Sheikh) =

Mosque in Sharm El Sheikh, Egypt

- مسجد الصحابة
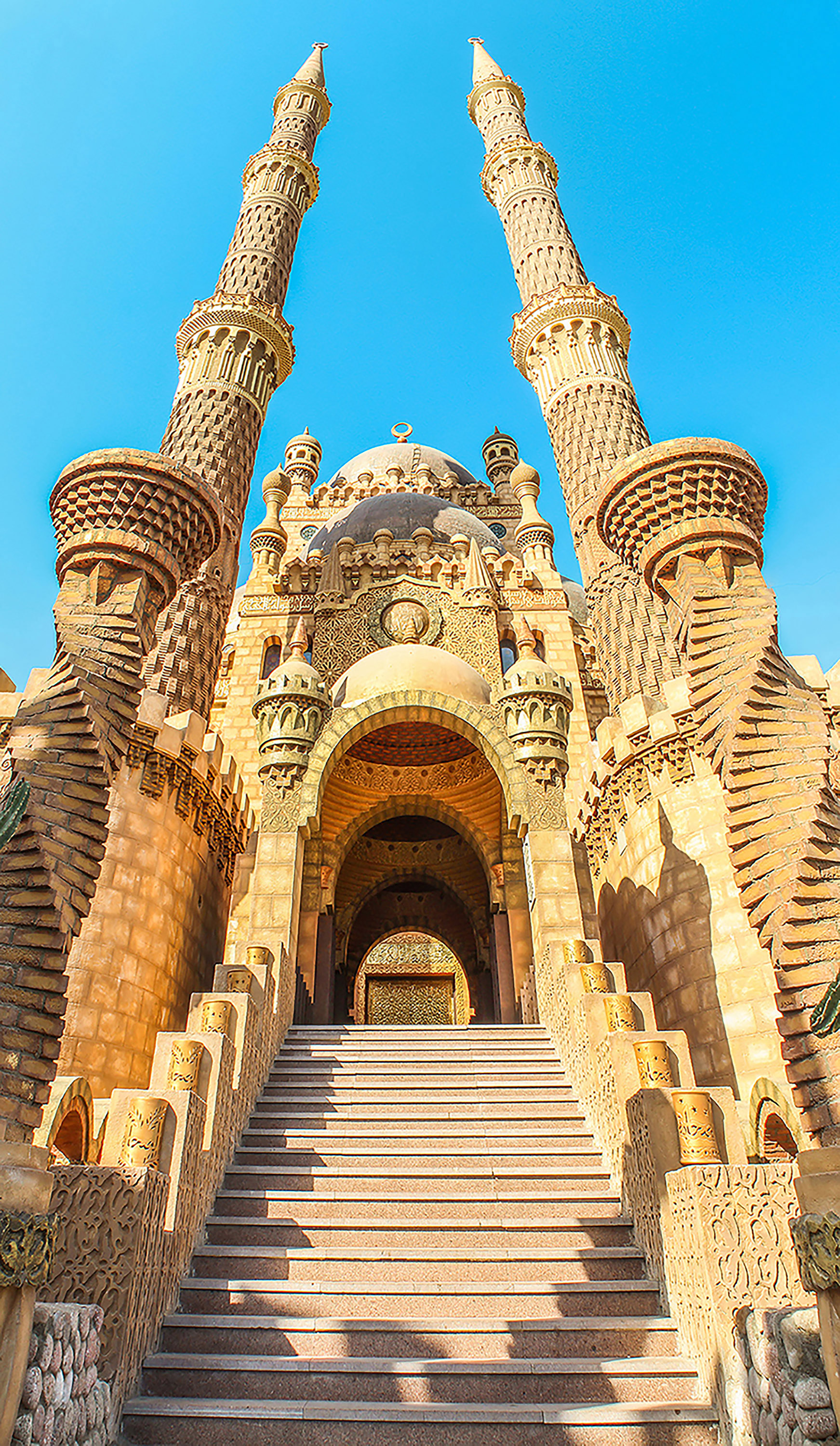

Religion
- Affiliation: Islam
- Ecclesiastical or organisational status: Mosque and mausoleum
- Status: Active

Location
- Location: Sharm El Sheikh
- Country: Egypt
- Interactive map of Al-Sahaba Mosque
- Coordinates: 27.8665°N 34.2952°E

Architecture
- Type: Mosque
- Completed: 2017

The Al-Sahaba Mosque (Arabic: مَسْجِد الصحابة, romanized: Masjid al-Sahaba) is a mosque located in the Old Market District of Sharm El Sheikh, Egypt. Built in 2017, it is the second largest mosque in the city after the Al-Mostafa Mosque. It is named Al-Sahaba (The Companions) after the Companions of the Prophet Muhammad.

== History ==
Founded in 2010, the mosque was designed by Egyptian architect Fouad Tawfik Hafez, designer of the Al-Mostafa mosque, free of charge. Construction stalled as a result of the 2011 Egyptian revolution. After resumption, the mosque eventually finished construction stage on 24 March 2017, reaching a budget of 30 million Egyptian pounds.

== Description ==
The mosque is built on an area of 3,000 square meters, with two 76-meter-long minarets.The mosque can accommodate around 3,000 visitors a day, and has a roof that rises 37 meters high. The mosque is built using Ottoman, Mamluk, and Fatimid features. The names of several of the companions of the Prophet Muhammad are inscribed inside the mosque's walls. The mosque contains a global Islamic cultural center as well as a library. The mosque employs sheikhs who can speak three languages alongside Arabic, those being English, French, and Russian.

== Gallery ==
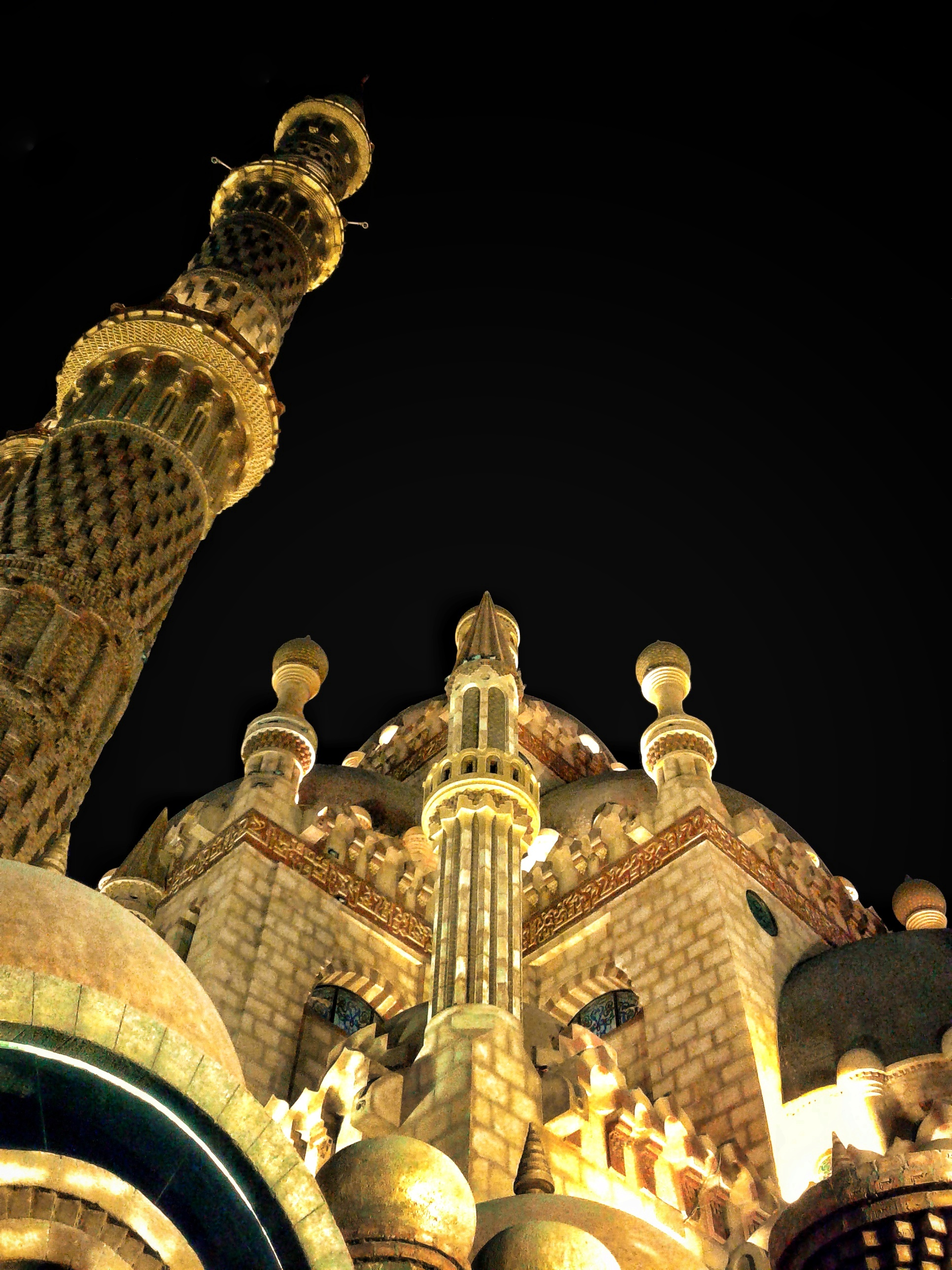
The mosque at night

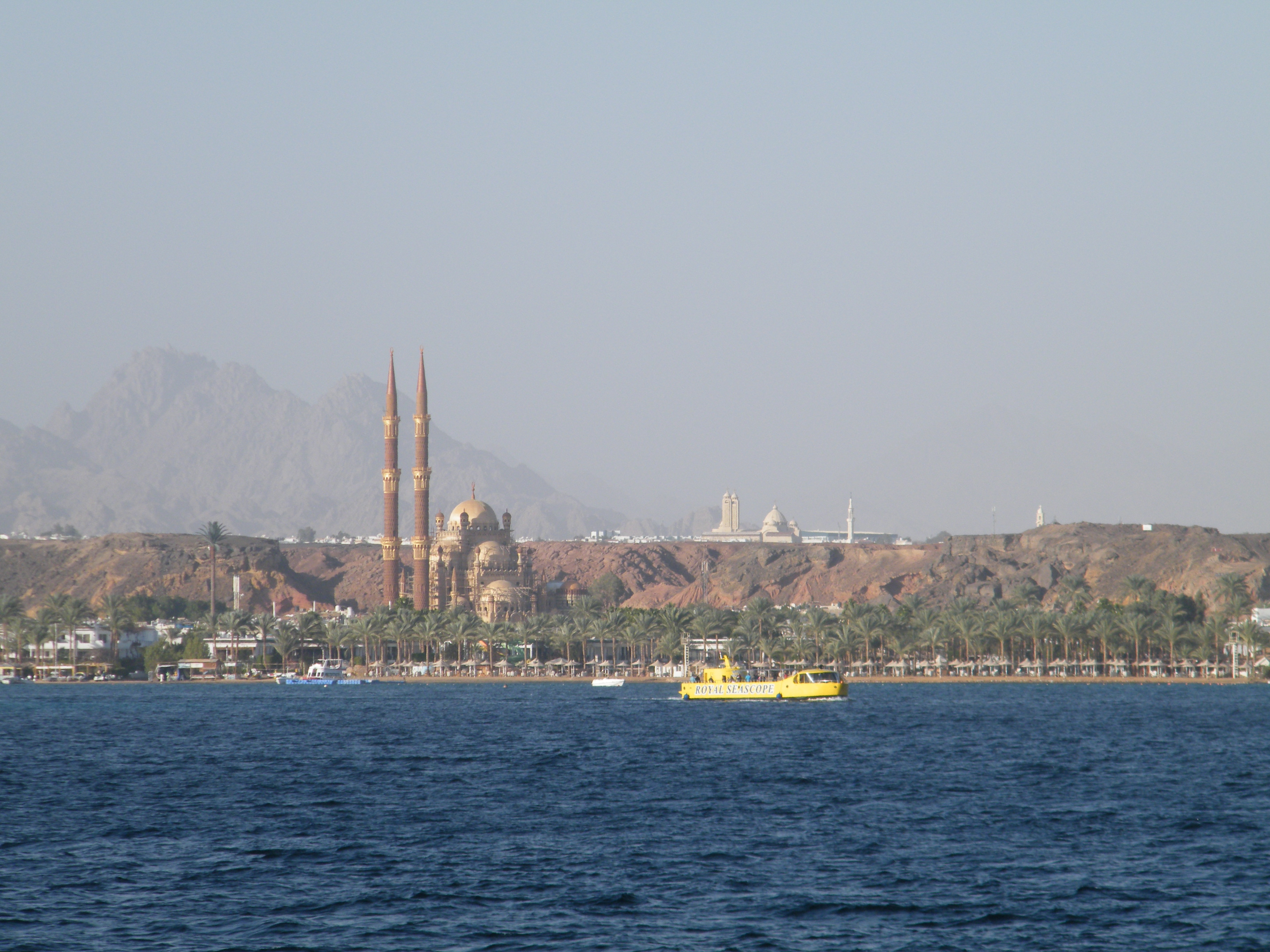
Panorama view of Sharm el-Sheikh with the mosque visible
