= Naama Bay =

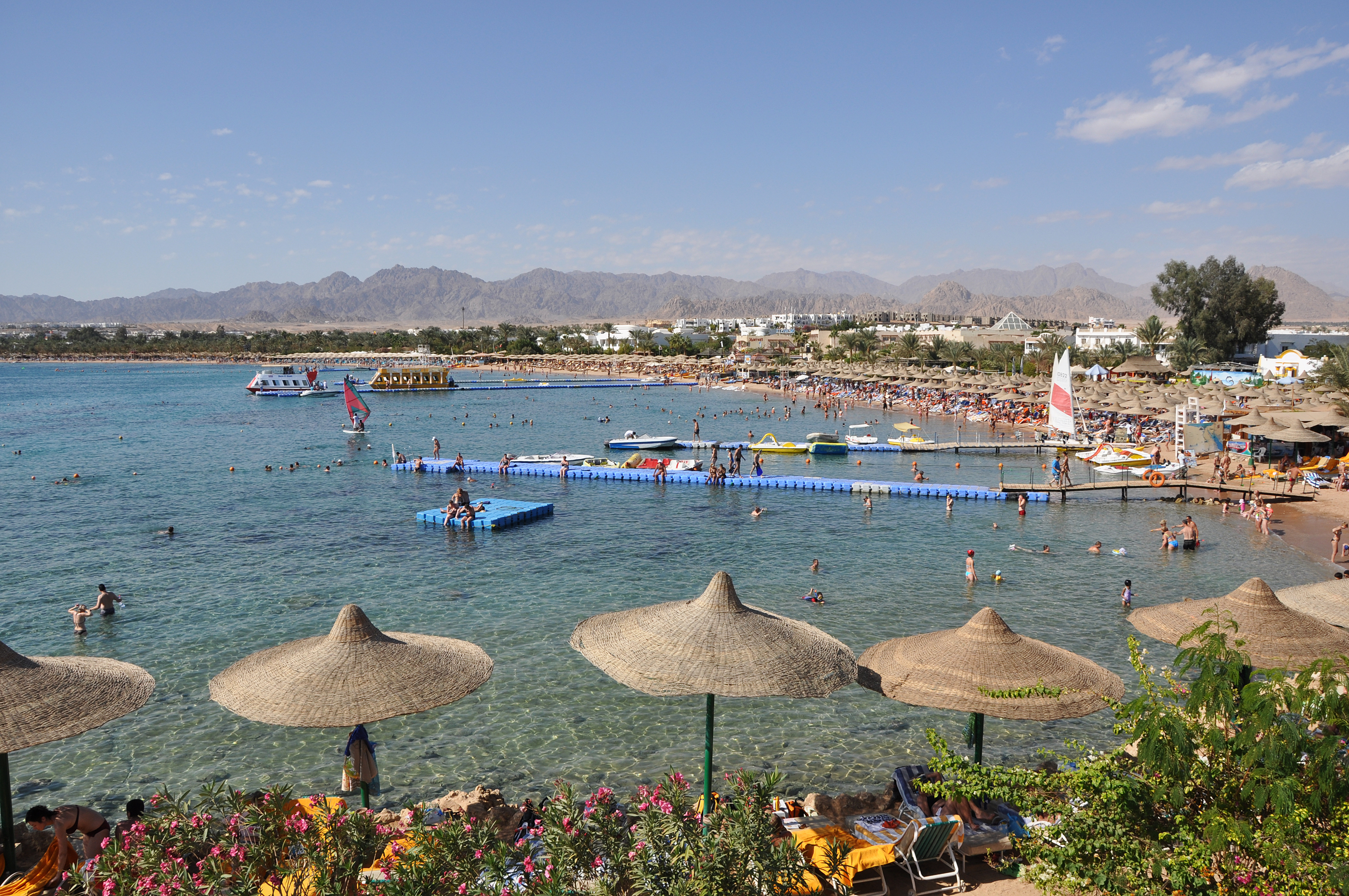

- Location within Sinai Location within Egypt
- Interactive map of Naama Bay
- Location: Sharm El Sheikh, South Sinai, Egypt
- Coordinates: 27.910528°N 34.332422°E
- Type: Natural bay

Naama Bay is a natural bay in Sharm El Sheikh, Egypt. It is considered the main hub for tourists in the city, as it is famous for its cafes, restaurants, hotels, and bazaars.
