= Parnu (disambiguation) =

Pärnu is a city in Estonia.

Parnu or Pärnu may also refer to:

- Pärnu County, a first-level administrative subdivision of Estonia
  - Pärnu (urban municipality), a subdivision of Parnu County
- Pärnu (river), a river in Estonia
- Ghodiyu, a type of cradle known in South India as "parnu"
