= Sharm El Sheikh =

Sharm El Sheikh شرم الشيخ
- City
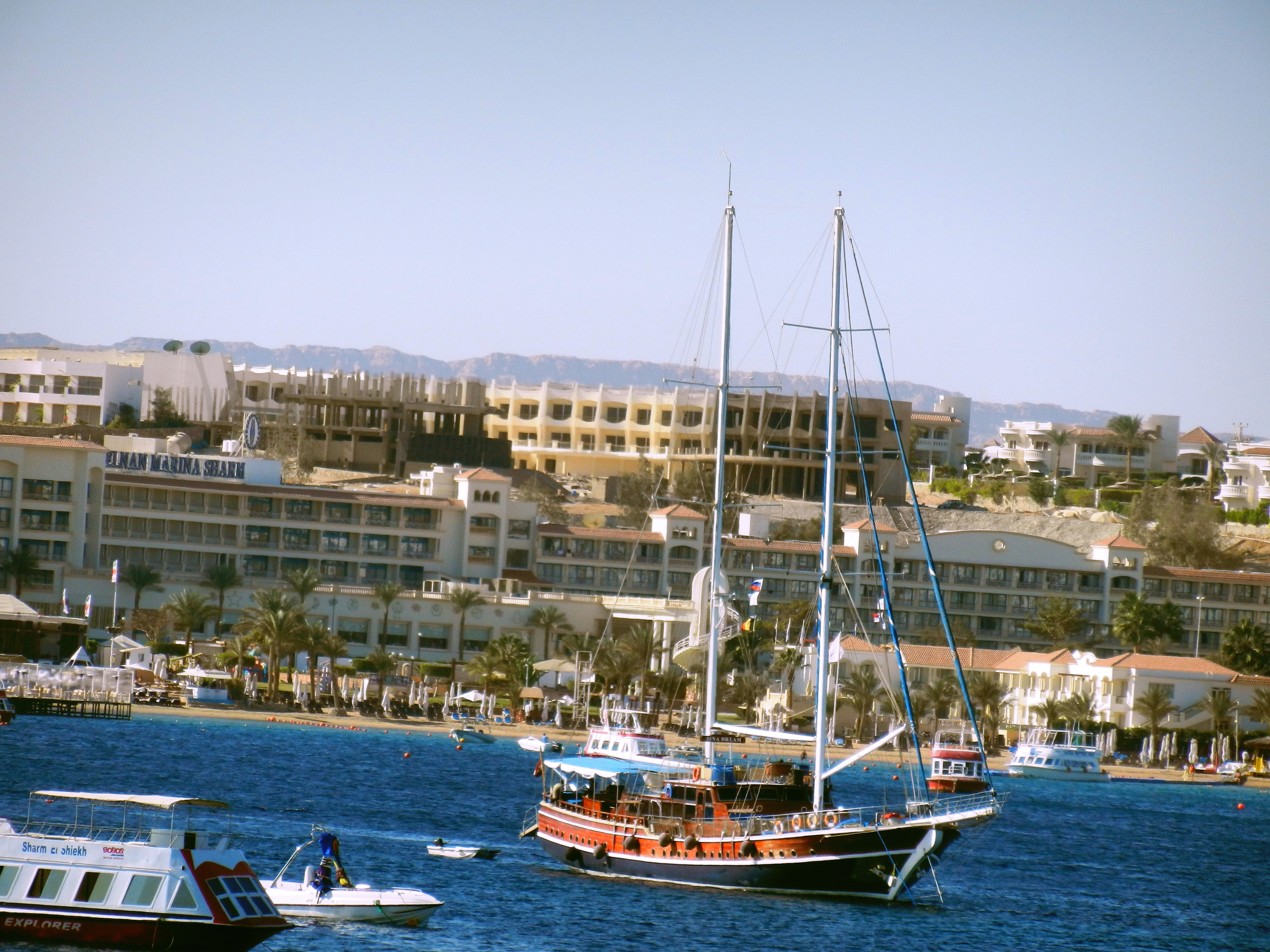
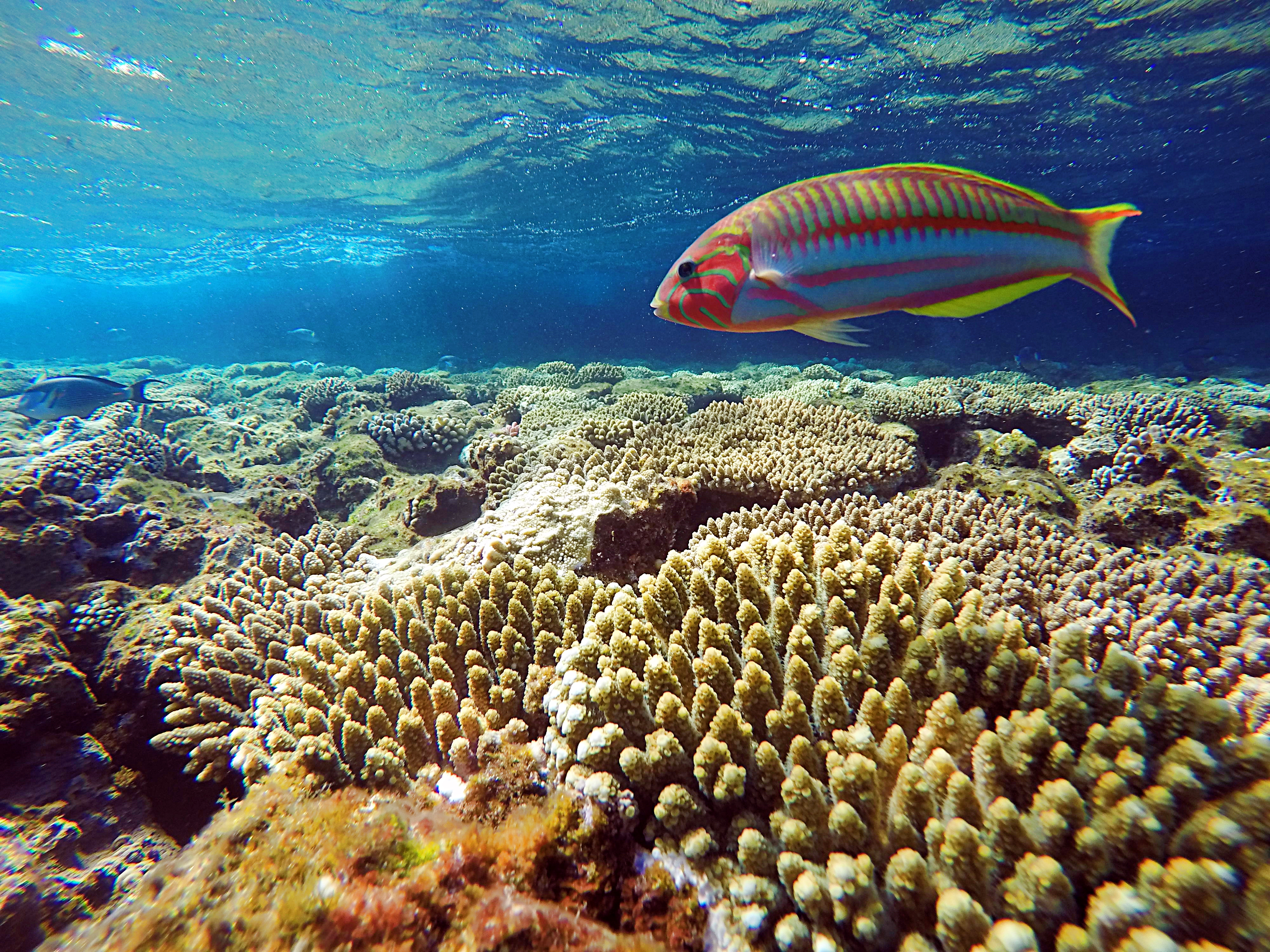
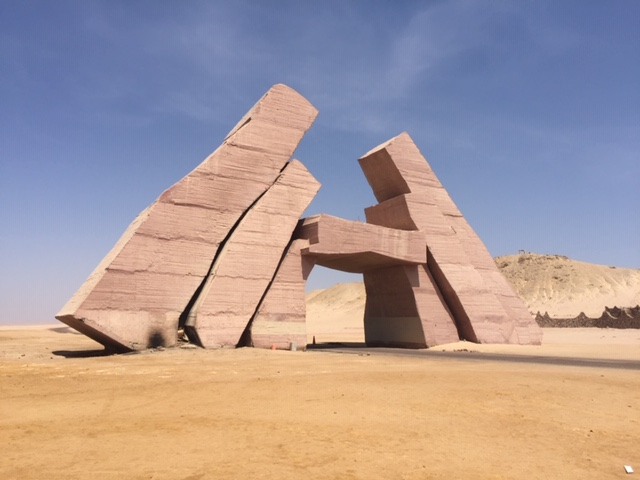
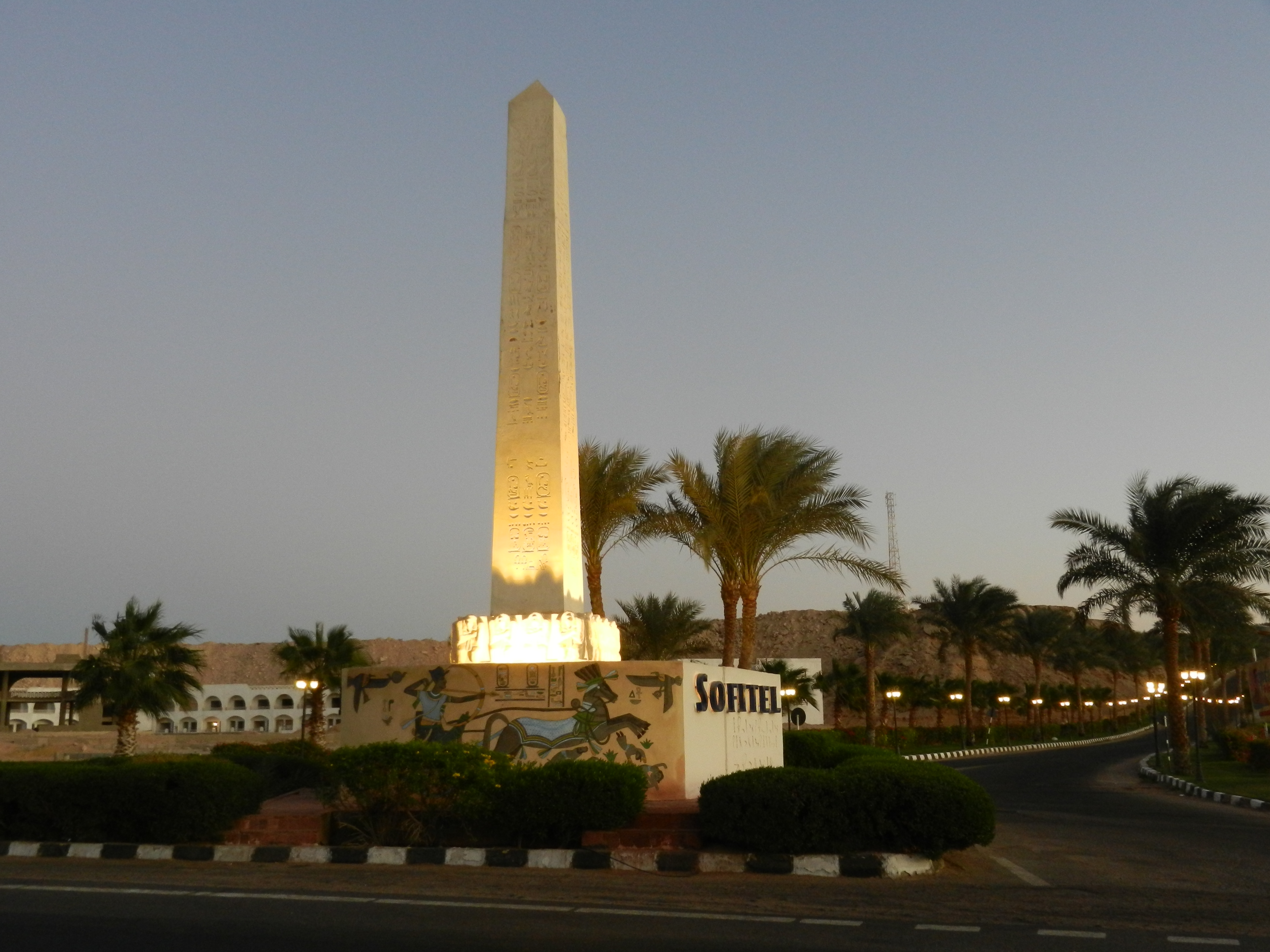
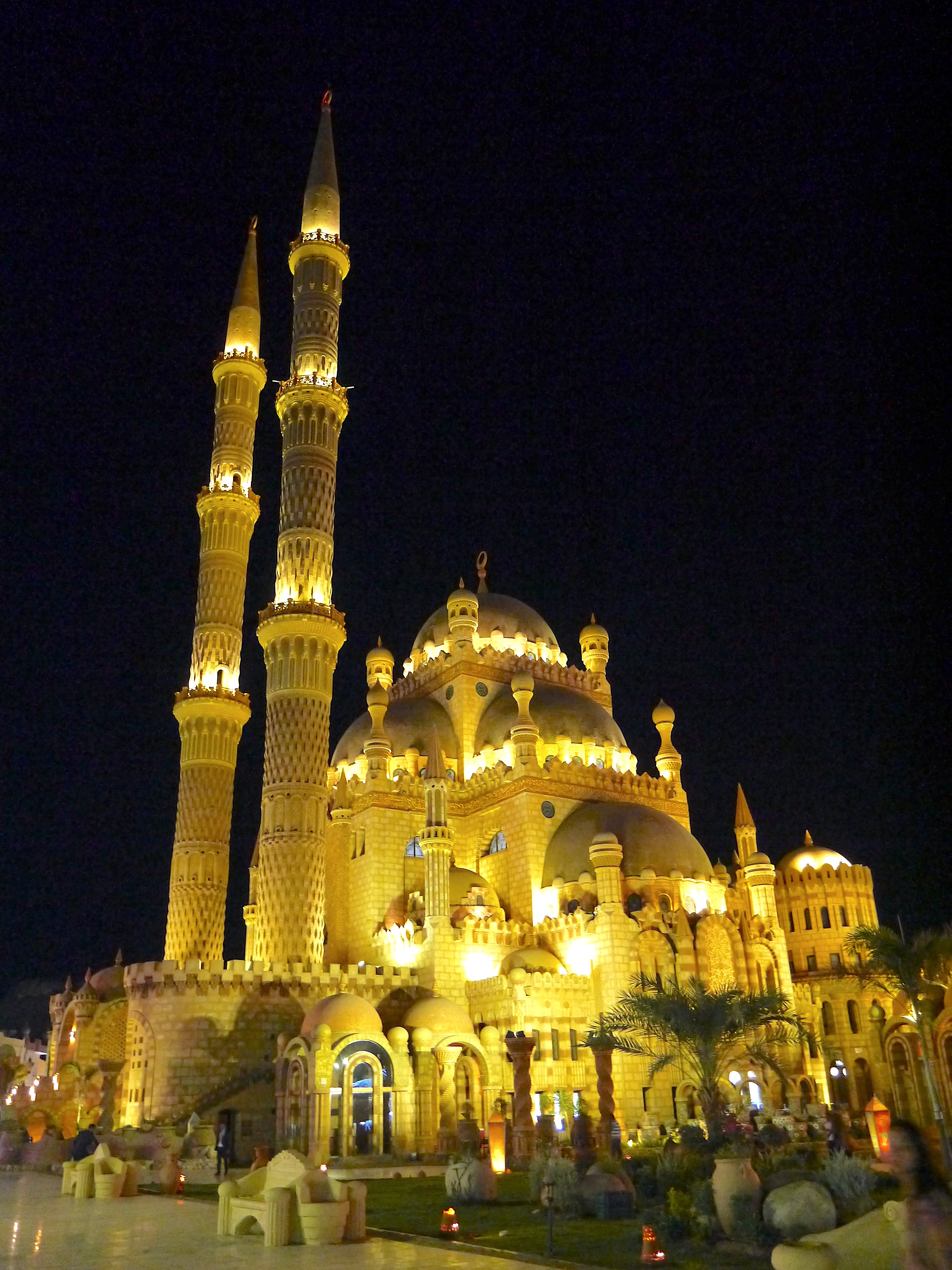
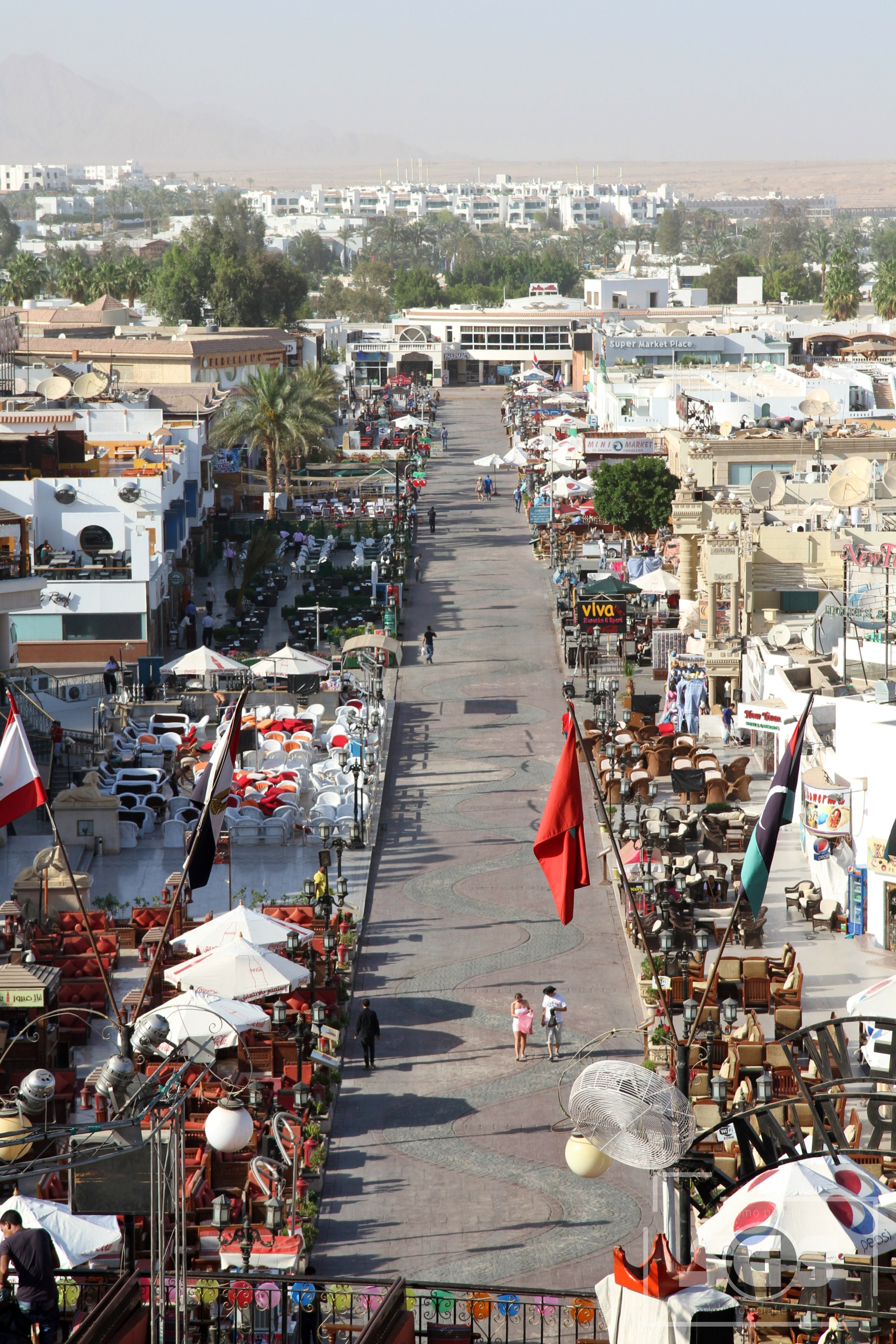
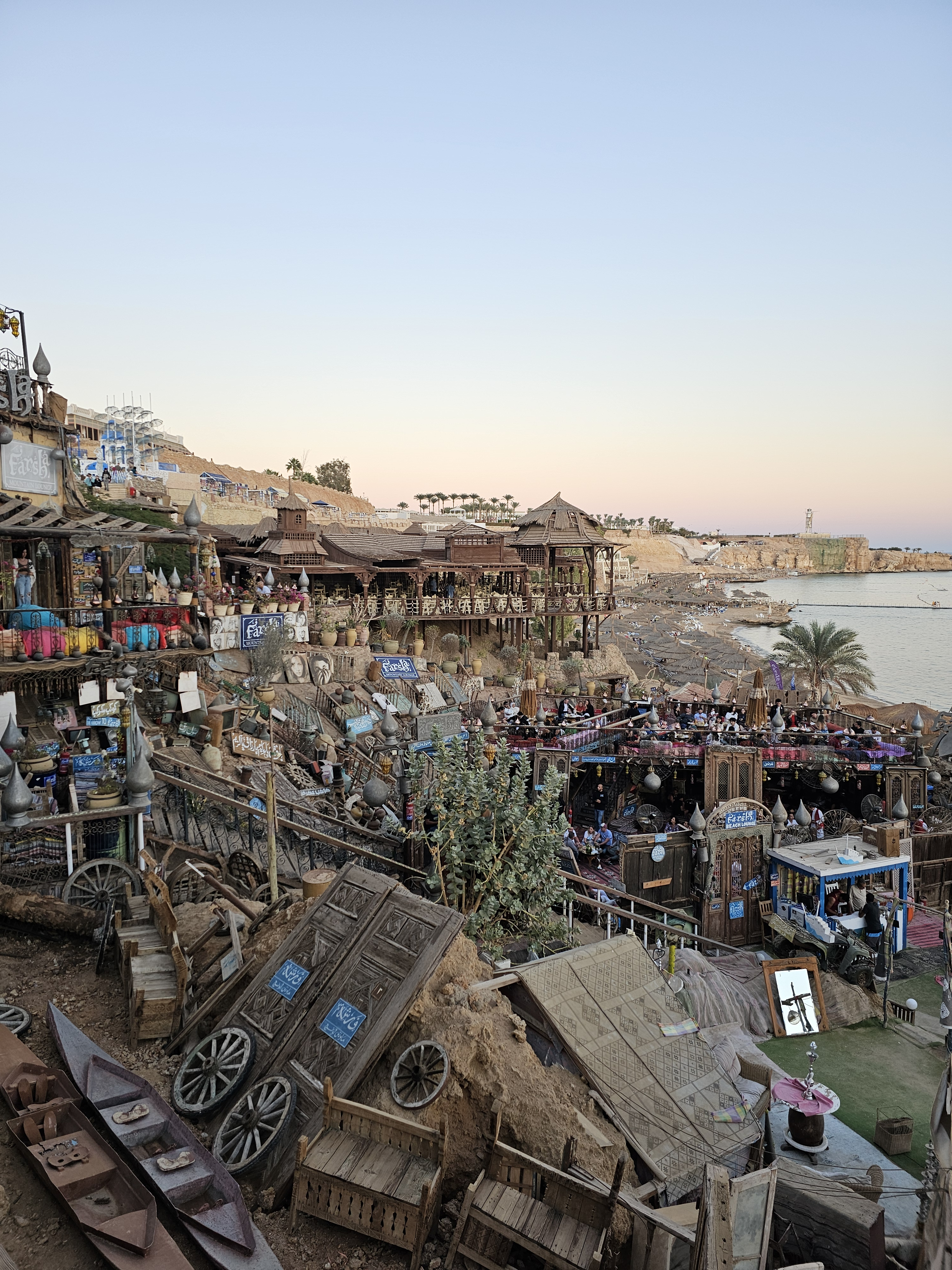
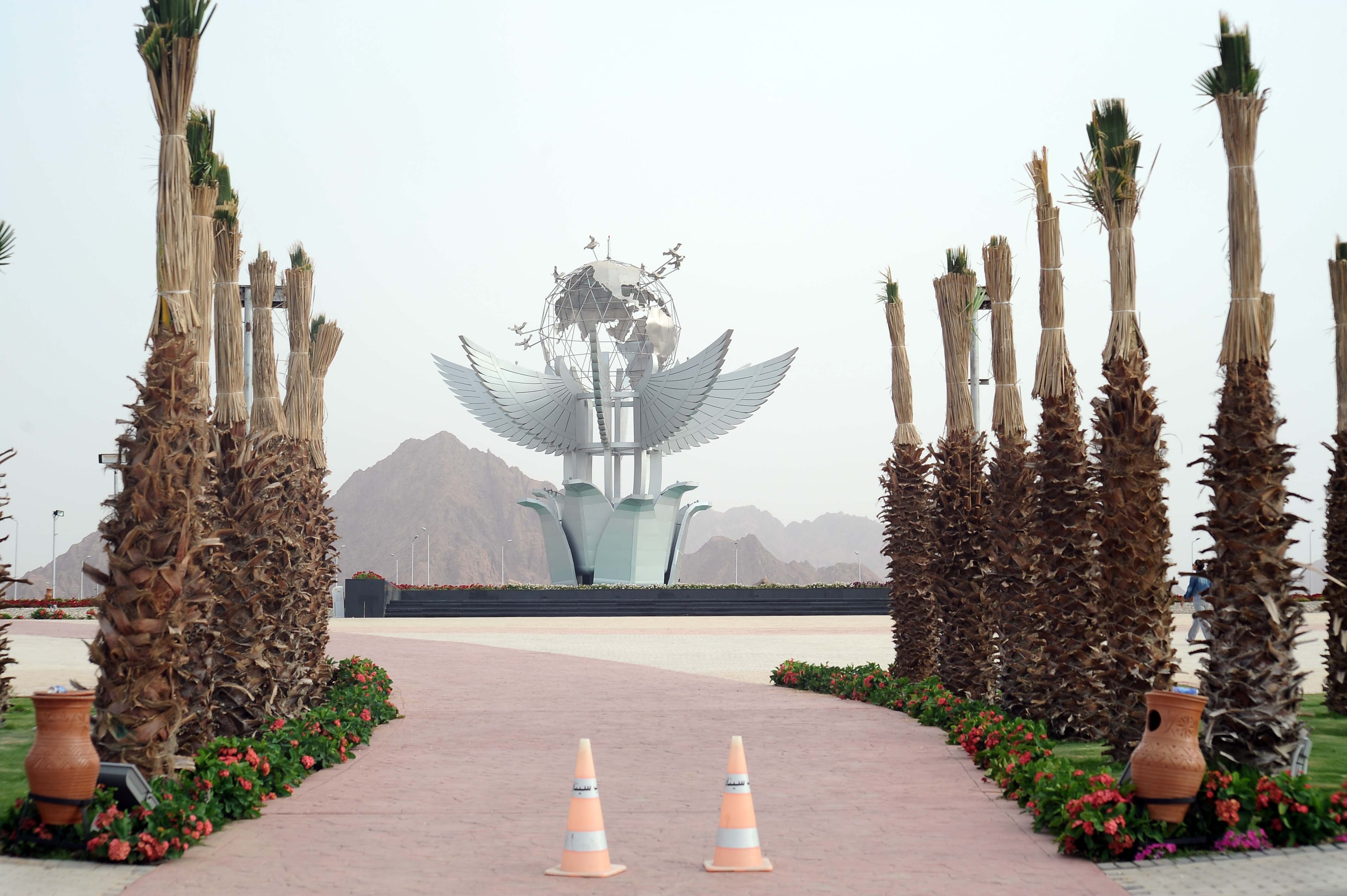
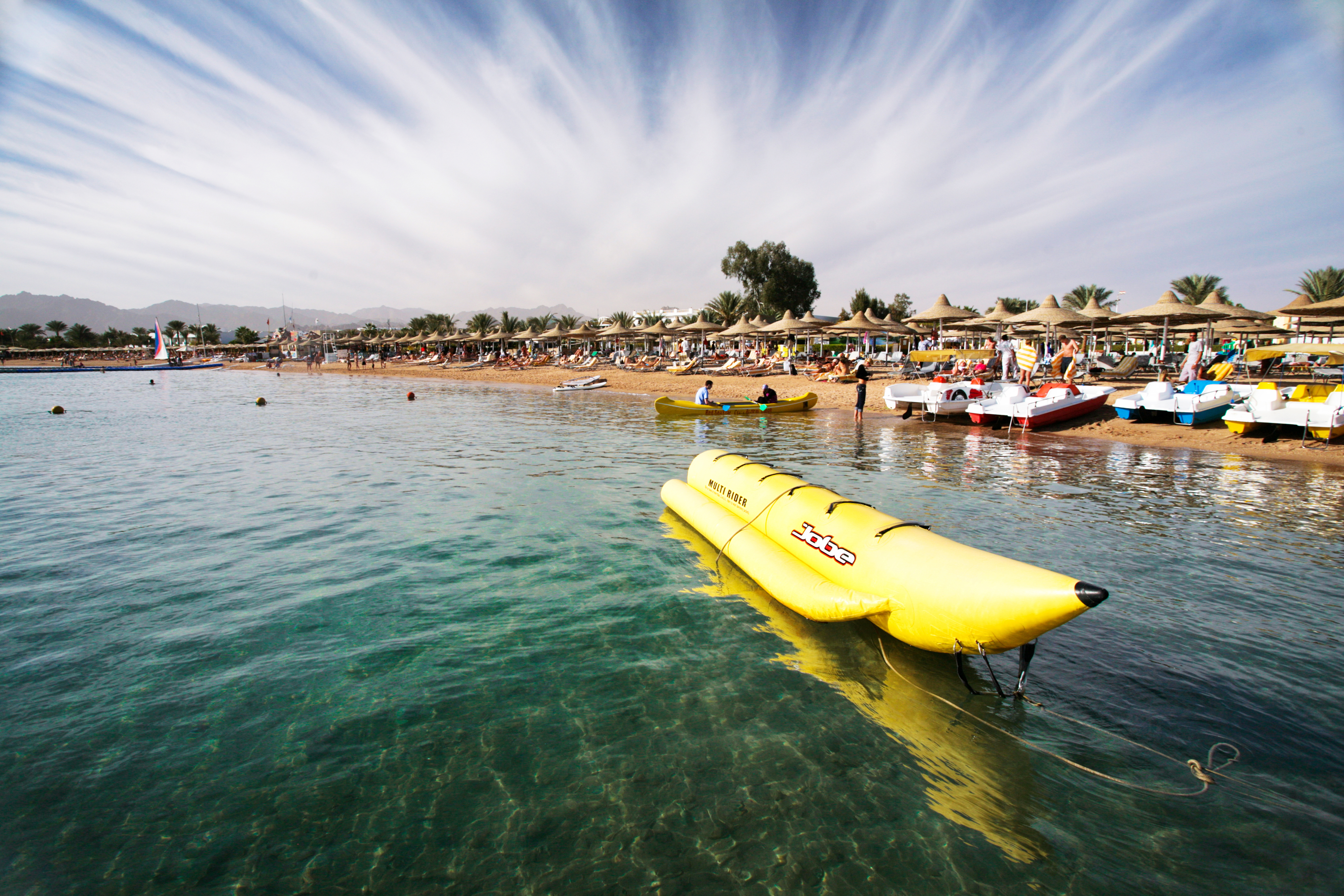
- Top-bottom, left-right: Sharm El Sheikh panorama, Coral reefs, Ras Mohamad Natural park entrance, City's obelisk, Al-Sahaba Mosque, Hadaba area and souk, Farsha Cafe, Monument of Peace and Naama Bay.

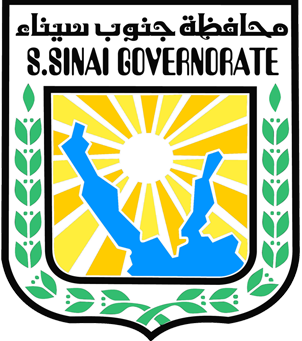
- Flag Seal
- Nickname: The City of Peace
- Location within Sinai Location within Egypt
- Coordinates: 27°54′54″N 34°19′39″E
- Country: Egypt
- Governorate: South Sinai

Area
  - Total: 44.68 km^{2} (17.25 sq mi)
- Elevation: 1 m (3.3 ft)

Population (2017)
  - Total: 77,000
  - Density: 1,700/km^{2} (4,500/sq mi)
- Time zone: UTC+2 (EGY)
  - Summer (DST): UTC+3 (EEST)
- Website: www.southsinai.gov.eg/City/Details/3

Sharm El Sheikh, (Note: (Egyptian Arabic: شرم الشيخ, romanized: Šarm eš-Šayḫ, IPA: [ˈʃɑɾm eʃˈʃeːx], literally "bay of the Sheikh")) alternatively rendered Sharm el-Sheikh or Charm el Sheikh, is an Egyptian city located on the southern tip of the Sinai Peninsula, in South Sinai Governorate, on the coastal strip along the Red Sea in Asia. Its population is approximately 77,000 as of 2017. Sharm El Sheikh is the administrative hub of Egypt's South Sinai Governorate, which includes the smaller coastal towns of Dahab and Nuweiba as well as the mountainous interior, St. Catherine and Mount Sinai.

It was historically a fishing town and military base, and was developed into a commercial and tourist-centric city afterwards. The Egyptian government continued and expanded the development, promoting Sharm El Sheikh as a major international resort city. Today, the city and holiday resort is a significant centre for tourism in Egypt, while also attracting many international conferences, concerts, clubbing and diplomatic meetings.

Downtown Sharm El Sheikh has the major concentrations of international banks in the city and is home to several large national companies. The city is home to major hospitals and health facilities, including Sharm International Hospital, the city's largest hospital and others engaged in health-related care and research. Sharm El Sheikh port is the city's seaport, which lies on the coast of the Red Sea, and the nearest airport is the city's Sharm El Sheikh International Airport. The Sharm El Sheikh metropolitan area is one of the most visited cities in Egypt, with over 3 million visitors in 2024.

== Name ==
The English name of Sharm El Sheikh is a borrowing of the Egyptian Arabic شرم الشيخ, šarm aš-šayḵ and, as such, does not have a fixed romanisation. There are documented uses of alternate versions such as Sharm el Sheikh and Sharm el-Sheikh, sometimes within the same news article.

Sharm El Sheikh is sometimes referred to as the "City of Peace" (مدينة السلام, madinet es-salām), referring to the large number of international peace conferences that have been held there.

Amongst Egyptians and also many visitors, the name of the city is commonly shortened to "Sharm" (Egyptian Arabic: [ʃɑɾm]), which is its common name in Egyptian Arabic.

== Geography and history ==
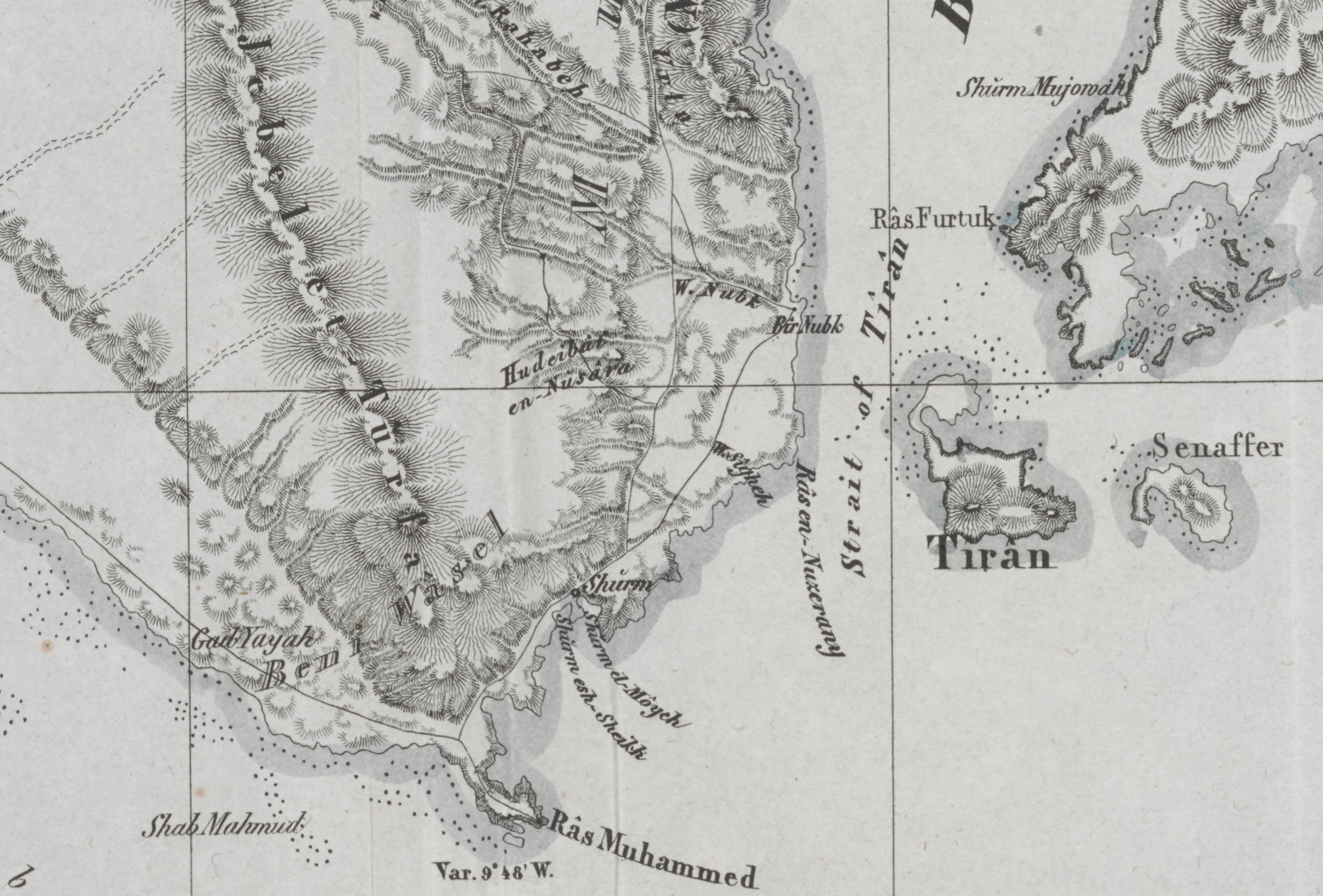
Sharm el Sheikh and the Strait of Tiran in the 1840 Kiepert map of the Sinai Peninsula. The town of Shurm is shown just north of two bays: Sharm El Sheikh and Sharm El Miya (Arabic: شرم المية). This area forms the southern tip of the modern city.

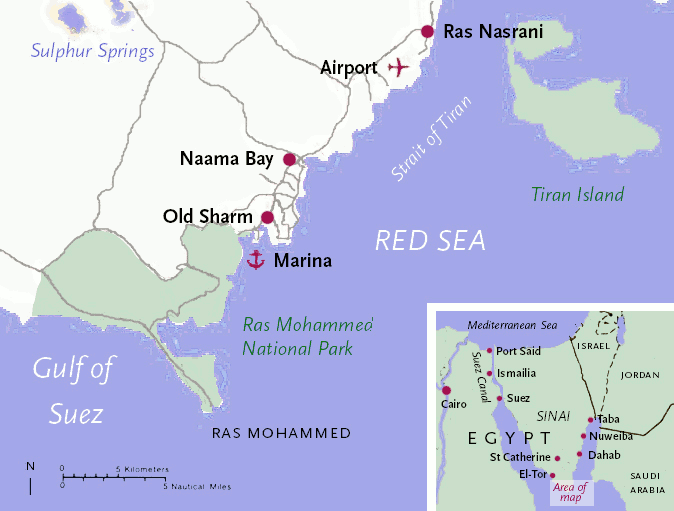
Sharm El Sheikh is located on the Egyptian Red Sea coast, at the southern tip of the Sinai Peninsula

Sharm El Sheikh is on a promontory overlooking the Straits of Tiran at the mouth of the Gulf of Aqaba. Its strategic importance led to its transformation from a fishing village into a major port and naval base for the Egyptian Navy. It was conquered by Israel during the Suez Crisis of 1956 and returned to Egypt in 1957. A United Nations peacekeeping force was stationed there until 1967 when it was ordered to leave by Egyptian President Gamal Abdel Nasser, a fact that precipitated the Six-Day War during which it was reoccupied by Israel. Sharm El Sheikh remained under Israeli control from 1967 until the Sinai Peninsula was returned back to Egypt in 1982, after the Egypt–Israel peace treaty of 1979 that was signed in Washington, D.C. During that time, an Israeli settlement named Ofira was built in the area. In 1968, Israel opened an air force military base there, where Egypt later built the Sharm el-Sheikh International Airport on the same location that included an enormous $420m investment by the Egyptian Holding Company for Airports and Air Navigation, a major project that helped put the city on global map. Unlike Sinai's other well-known settlement, Yamit, Ofira was not demolished after Israel ceded control of Sinai to Egypt following the Camp David Accords, but was handed over intact and is today a thriving tourist town and home to local Egyptian residents.

Egypt's former president Hosni Mubarak designated Sharm El Sheikh as The City of Peace in 1982 and the Egyptian government began a policy of encouraging massive development of the city. Egyptian businessmen and investors, along with global investors contributed to building several mega projects, including mosques and churches. The city is now an international tourist destination, and environmental zoning laws limit the height of buildings to avoid obscuring the natural beauty of the surroundings. In 2022, Sharm El-Sheikh along with another Egyptian city, Hurghada, were both chosen by Trip advisor as the world's top 25 tourist destinations.

A hierarchical planning approach was adopted for the Gulf of Aqaba, whereby the area's components were evaluated and subdivided into zones, cities and centers. In accordance with this approach, the Gulf of Aqaba zone was subdivided into four cities: Taba, Nuweiba, Dahab and Sharm El Sheikh. Sharm El Sheikh city has been subdivided into five homogeneous centers, namely Nabq, Ras Nusrani, Naama Bay, Umm Sid and Sharm El Maya.

Sharm El Sheikh city, with Naama Bay, Hay el Nour, Hadaba, Rowaysat, Montazah and Shark's Bay form a metropolitan area.

The site off the shore gun emplacements at Ras Nasrani opposite Tiran Island is now a diving area.

In 2005, the resort was hit by the Sharm El Sheikh terrorist attacks, which were carried out by an extremist Islamist organisation targeting Egypt's tourist industry. Eighty-eight people were killed, the majority of them Egyptians, and over 200 were wounded by the attack, making it the second deadliest terrorist attack in the country's history.

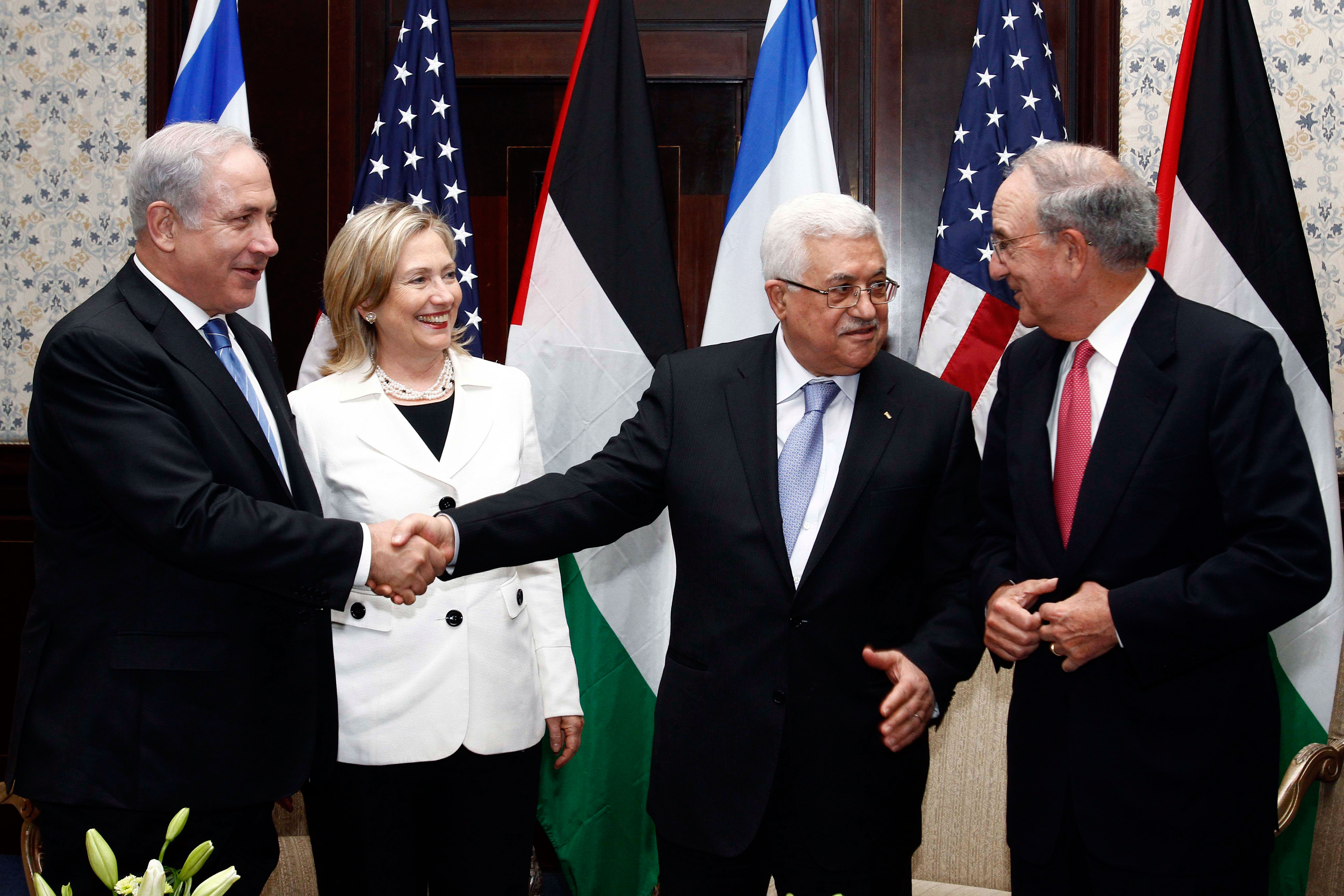
The city has hosted a number of important Middle Eastern peace conferences, including the 2010–2011 Israeli–Palestinian peace talks.

The city has played host to a number of important Middle Eastern peace conferences, including the 4 September 1999 agreement to establish Palestinian self-rule over the Gaza Strip. A second summit was held at Sharm on 17 October 2000 following the outbreak of the second Palestinian intifada, but it failed to end the violence. A summit was held in the city on 3 August 2005 on developments in the Arab world, such as the situation in the Arab–Israeli conflict. Again in 2007, an important ministerial meeting took place in Sharm, where dignitaries discussed Iraqi reconstruction.

The World Economic Forum on the Middle East was hosted by Sharm El Sheikh in 2006 and 2008. Amidst the 2011 Egyptian protests, then-president Mubarak reportedly went to Sharm El Sheikh and resigned there on 11 February 2011. The 2014 World Economic Forum in Sharm El Sheikh heralded a new initiative for desert cities urban development in Egypt.

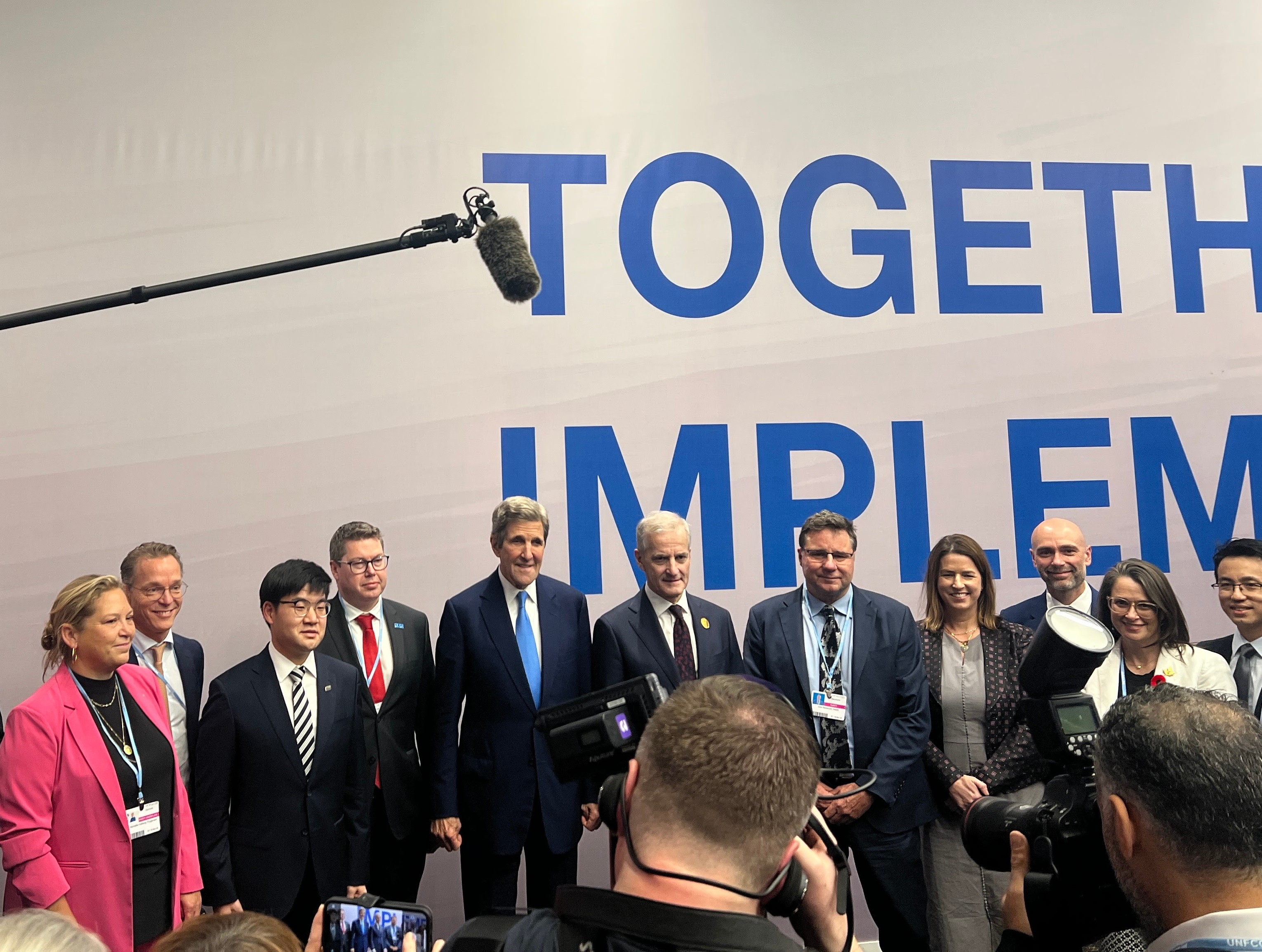
John Kerry, Sam Cho, and others at COP27, Sharm-El-Sheikh, Egypt (2022).

In November 2022, the United Nations Climate Change Conference (COP27) was held in Sharm El Sheikh. This conference led to the first loss and damage fund being created.

On Monday, October 13, 2025, the city hosted the Gaza peace summit which was co-chaired by President Abdel Fattah El-Sisi and US President Donald Trump, with the participation of world leaders from more than 20 countries aiming to end the war in the Gaza Strip.

== Climate ==
Sharm El Sheikh

Climate chart (precipitation, max. and min. temperature)
| J | F | M | A | M | J | J | A | S | O | N | D |
| 0 21 10 | 1 22 11 | 1 25 14 | 0 28 17 | 0 31 20 | 0 34 23 | 0 34 25 | 0 35 25 | 0 33 23 | 1 30 20 | 0 26 16 | 1 22 12 |
- █ Average max. and min. temperatures in °C
- █ Precipitation totals in mm
- Source: Climate-Data.org
Imperial conversion
| J | F | M | A | M | J | J | A | S | O | N | D |
| 0 70 50 | 0 72 51 | 0 77 57 | 0 82 62 | 0 89 68 | 0 93 74 | 0 94 76 | 0 94 76 | 0 91 74 | 0 86 67 | 0 79 60 | 0 72 53 |
- █ Average max. and min. temperatures in °F
- █ Precipitation totals in inches

The city experiences a subtropical arid climate, classified by the Köppen–Geiger system as hot desert (BWh). Temperatures are just short of a tropical climate. Typical temperatures range from 18 to 23 °C (64 to 73 °F) in January and 33 to 37 °C (91 to 99 °F) in August. The temperature of the Red Sea in this region ranges from 21 to 28 °C (70 to 82 °F) over the course of the year.

Marsa Alam, Kosseir and Sharm El Sheikh have the warmest winter night temperatures of cities and resorts in Egypt.

The highest recorded temperature was 46 °C (115 °F) on 3 June 2013, and the lowest recorded temperature was 5 °C (41 °F) on 23 February 2000.

Climate data for Sharm El Sheikh
| Month | Jan | Feb | Mar | Apr | May | Jun | Jul | Aug | Sep | Oct | Nov | Dec | Year |
|---|---|---|---|---|---|---|---|---|---|---|---|---|---|
| Record high °C (°F) | 31 (88) | 34 (93) | 37 (99) | 41 (106) | 44 (111) | 46 (115) | 46 (115) | 45 (113) | 43 (109) | 41 (106) | 37 (99) | 32 (90) | 46 (115) |
| Mean daily maximum °C (°F) | 21.7 (71.1) | 22.4 (72.3) | 25.1 (77.2) | 29.8 (85.6) | 33.9 (93.0) | 37 (99) | 37.5 (99.5) | 37.5 (99.5) | 35.4 (95.7) | 31.5 (88.7) | 27 (81) | 23.2 (73.8) | 30.2 (86.4) |
| Daily mean °C (°F) | 15.6 (60.1) | 16.5 (61.7) | 19.6 (67.3) | 22.2 (72.0) | 25.8 (78.4) | 28.5 (83.3) | 29.4 (84.9) | 29.6 (85.3) | 27.8 (82.0) | 24.7 (76.5) | 20.9 (69.6) | 16.9 (62.4) | 23.1 (73.6) |
| Mean daily minimum °C (°F) | 13.3 (55.9) | 13.7 (56.7) | 16.1 (61.0) | 20.1 (68.2) | 23.8 (74.8) | 26.5 (79.7) | 26.7 (80.1) | 28 (82) | 26.5 (79.7) | 23.4 (74.1) | 18.9 (66.0) | 15 (59) | 21.0 (69.8) |
| Record low °C (°F) | 7 (45) | 5 (41) | 10 (50) | 12 (54) | 17 (63) | 23 (73) | 20 (68) | 23 (73) | 22 (72) | 17 (63) | 14 (57) | 8 (46) | 5 (41) |
| Average precipitation mm (inches) | 0.5 (0.02) | 0.2 (0.01) | 1.2 (0.05) | 0.2 (0.01) | 0.5 (0.02) | 0 (0) | 0 (0) | 0 (0) | 0.04 (0.00) | 0.8 (0.03) | 3.3 (0.13) | 0.5 (0.02) | 7.24 (0.29) |
| Average precipitation days (≥ 0.01 mm) | 0.3 | 0.1 | 0.5 | 0.1 | 0 | 0 | 0 | 0 | 0.1 | 0.4 | 0.4 | 0.3 | 2.2 |
| Average relative humidity (%) (daily average) | 42 | 40 | 35 | 31 | 29 | 27 | 31 | 32 | 39 | 42 | 41 | 40 | 36 |
| Average dew point °C (°F) | 5 (41) | 5 (41) | 6 (43) | 7 (45) | 9 (48) | 10 (50) | 14 (57) | 14 (57) | 15 (59) | 14 (57) | 10 (50) | 6 (43) | 10 (49) |
| Mean monthly sunshine hours | 279 | 251 | 310 | 300 | 341 | 390 | 403 | 372 | 330 | 310 | 270 | 248 | 3,804 |
| Mean daily sunshine hours | 8 | 9 | 10 | 10 | 11 | 13 | 13 | 12 | 11 | 10 | 9 | 8 | 10 |
Source 1: World Meteorological Organization, Climate-Data.org for mean temperatures
Source 2: Voodoo Skies for record temperatures Time and Date (dewpoints and humidity, 2005-2015) Weather Atlas (mean daily sun hours)

Climate data for Sharm El Sheikh (Sharm El Sheikh International Airport) 1991–2020 normals
| Month | Jan | Feb | Mar | Apr | May | Jun | Jul | Aug | Sep | Oct | Nov | Dec | Year |
|---|---|---|---|---|---|---|---|---|---|---|---|---|---|
| Mean daily maximum °C (°F) | 22.2 (72.0) | 23.6 (74.5) | 26.4 (79.5) | 30.4 (86.7) | 34.7 (94.5) | 37.5 (99.5) | 38.3 (100.9) | 38.2 (100.8) | 36.1 (97.0) | 32.5 (90.5) | 27.8 (82.0) | 23.9 (75.0) | 31.0 (87.7) |
| Daily mean °C (°F) | 17.8 (64.0) | 19.1 (66.4) | 21.8 (71.2) | 25.3 (77.5) | 29.4 (84.9) | 32.2 (90.0) | 33.1 (91.6) | 33.3 (91.9) | 31.3 (88.3) | 28.0 (82.4) | 23.5 (74.3) | 19.6 (67.3) | 26.2 (79.1) |
| Mean daily minimum °C (°F) | 13.8 (56.8) | 14.6 (58.3) | 17.3 (63.1) | 20.6 (69.1) | 24.3 (75.7) | 27.0 (80.6) | 28.3 (82.9) | 28.8 (83.8) | 27.0 (80.6) | 24.1 (75.4) | 19.6 (67.3) | 15.6 (60.1) | 21.8 (71.1) |
| Average precipitation mm (inches) | 2.81 (0.11) | 0.09 (0.00) | 1.59 (0.06) | 0.18 (0.01) | 0.5 (0.02) | 0.0 (0.0) | 0.0 (0.0) | 0.0 (0.0) | 0.03 (0.00) | 1.56 (0.06) | 2.21 (0.09) | 1.08 (0.04) | 10.05 (0.39) |
| Average precipitation days (≥ 1.0 mm) | 0.17 | 0.07 | 0.13 | 0.0 | 0.14 | 0.0 | 0.0 | 0.0 | 0.0 | 0.14 | 0.14 | 0.1 | 0.89 |
Source: NOAA

Climate data for Sharm El-Sheikh
| Month | Jan | Feb | Mar | Apr | May | Jun | Jul | Aug | Sep | Oct | Nov | Dec | Year |
|---|---|---|---|---|---|---|---|---|---|---|---|---|---|
| Average sea temperature °C (°F) | 23.3 (74.0) | 22.4 (72.4) | 22.6 (72.7) | 23.1 (73.6) | 24.6 (76.3) | 26.3 (79.4) | 28.3 (83.0) | 28.8 (83.9) | 27.9 (82.1) | 27.5 (81.5) | 25.6 (78.2) | 24.4 (75.9) | 25.4 (77.8) |
| Mean daily daylight hours | 11.0 | 11.0 | 12.0 | 13.0 | 14.0 | 14.0 | 14.0 | 13.0 | 12.0 | 11.0 | 11.0 | 10.0 | 12.2 |
| Average Ultraviolet index | 5 | 6 | 8 | 11 | 11 | 11+ | 11+ | 11 | 10 | 8 | 5 | 4 | 8.4 |
Source #1: seatemperature.org (Sea temperature)
Source #2: Weather Atlas

== Economy and tourism ==
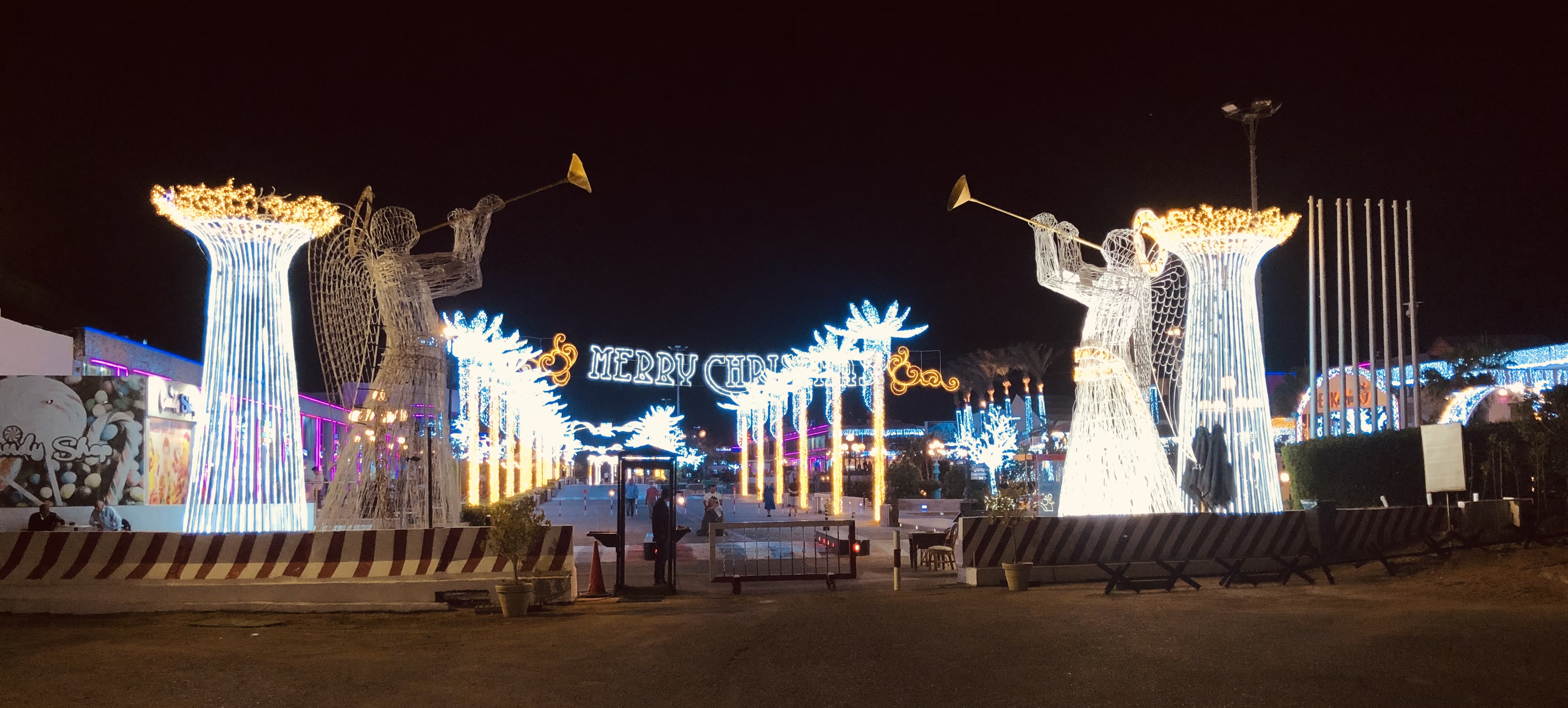
Soho Square Sharm El Sheikh

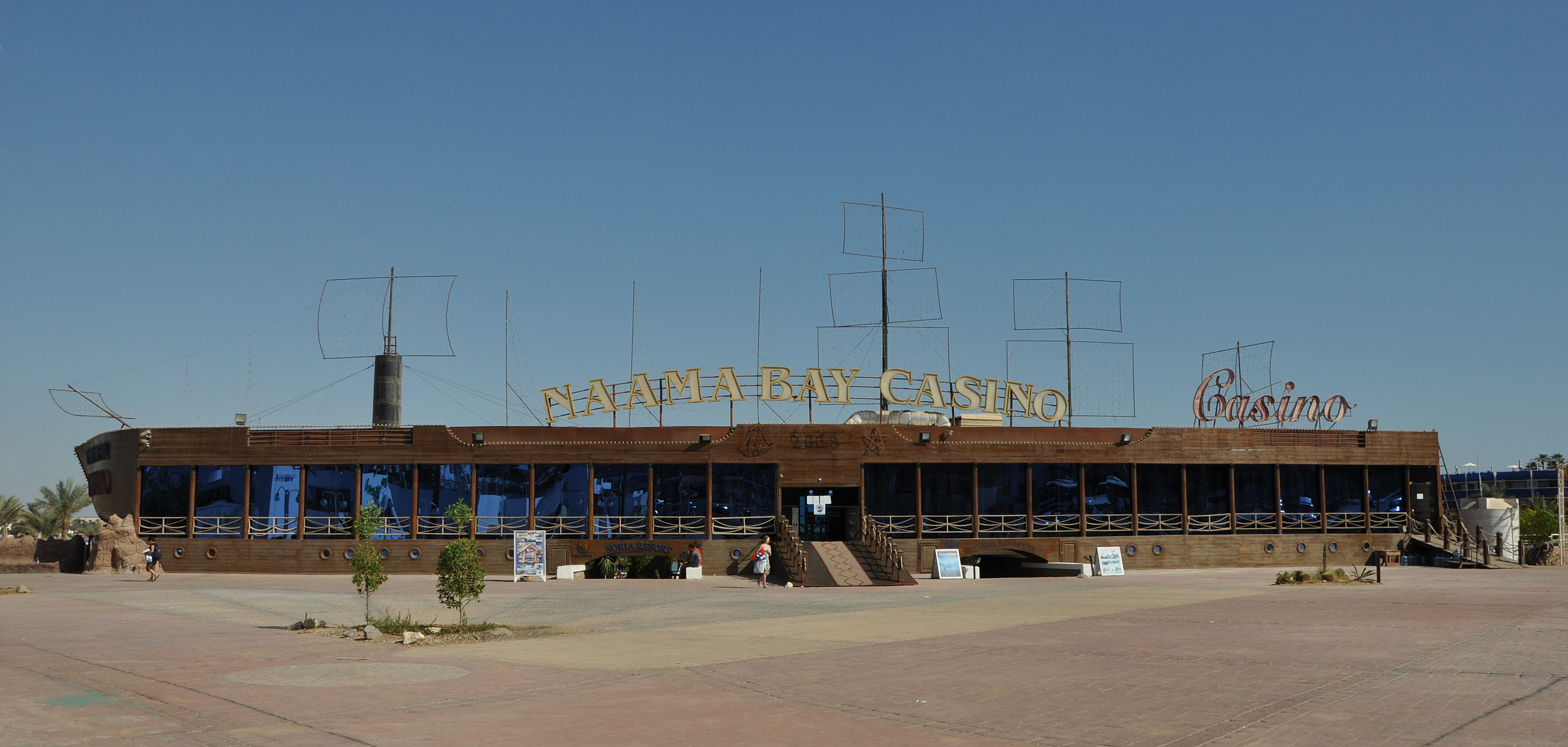
Naama Bay Casino

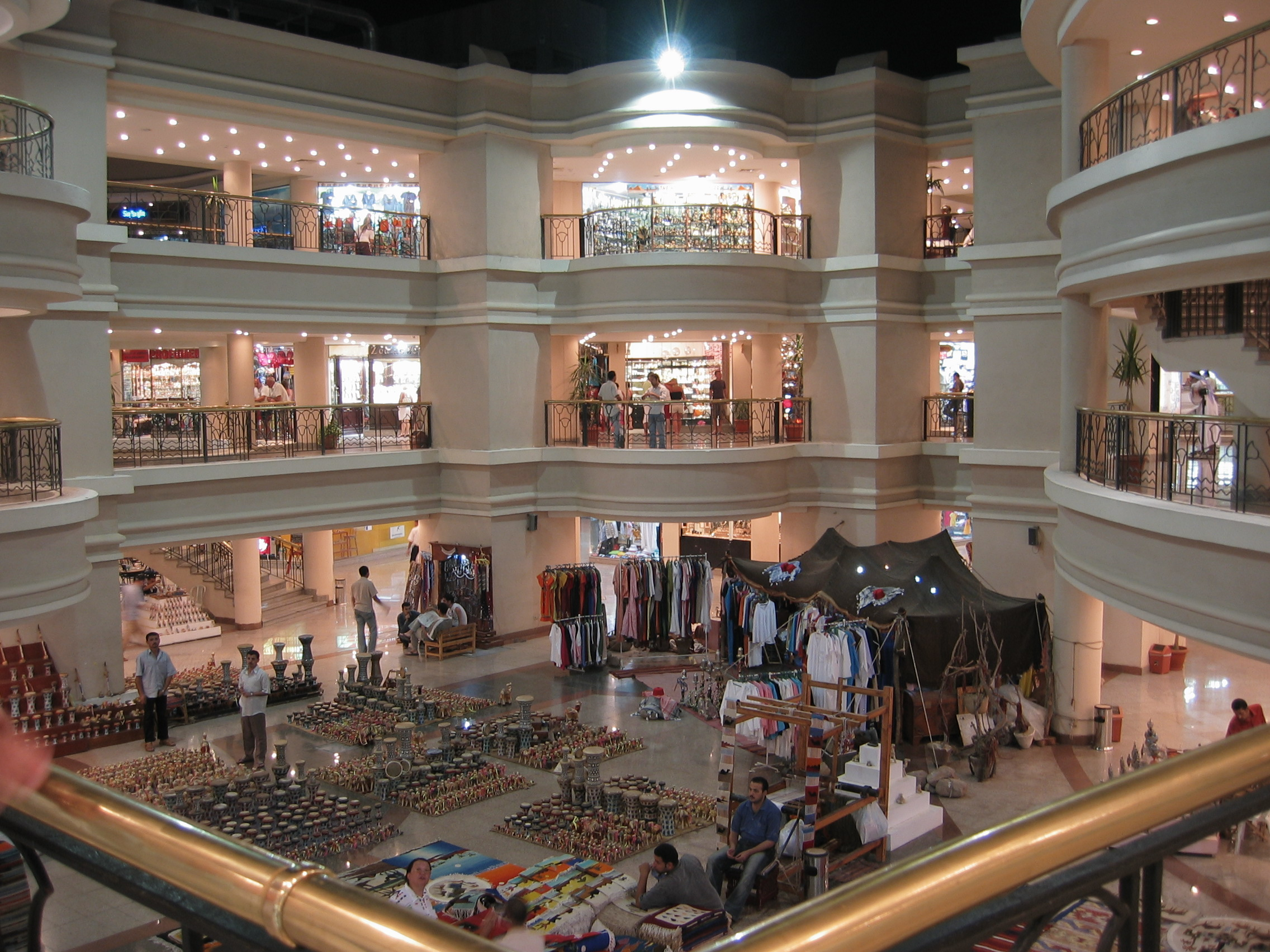
Naama Bay mall

Sharm El Sheikh's major industry is foreign and domestic tourism, owing to its landscape, year-round dry climate with long hot summers and warm winters and its long beaches. Its waters are clear and calm for most of the year and have become popular for various water sports, particularly recreational scuba diving and snorkelling. There is scope for scientific tourism due to the diversity of marine life: 250 different coral reefs and 1000 species of fishes.

These natural resources, together with its proximity to tourist markets in Europe, have stimulated rapid growth in tourism in the region. The number of resorts has increased from three in 1982 to ninety-one in 2000. Guest nights also increased in that period from sixteen thousand to 5.1 million. International hotel companies that currently operate in the city include Accor (Mövenpick, Novotel, Rixos), Deutsche Hospitality (Steigenberger), Four Seasons, Hilton (DoubleTree), Marriott (Renaissance, Sheraton), and Rotana, with categories of three to five stars. In 2007, the first aqua park hotel resort opened in the area. The four-star Aqua Blu Sharm Resort was built on the Ras Om El Seid, with an area of 133,905 square metres (1,441,340 ft^{2}).

Sharm is also home to a congress center, located along Peace Road, where international political and economic meetings have been held, including peace conferences, ministerial meetings, world bank meetings, and Arab League meetings. The Maritim Sharm El Sheikh International Congress Centre can host events and congresses for up to 4,700 participants.

There is nightlife in Sharm El Sheikh. The colourful handicraft stands of the local Bedouin culture are a popular attraction. Ras Muhammad National Park, at the southernmost tip of the peninsula, has been designated a national park, protecting the area's wildlife, natural landscape, shoreline and coral reef. There are a number of international hotels and restaurants in the centre of Sharm, in the area known as Naama Bay, with golf courses and other leisure facilities further up the coast.

The Nabq Managed Resource Protected Area is a 600-square-kilometre (230 mi^{2}) area of mangroves, coral reefs, fertile dunes, birds and wildlife.

As of 2012, nationals from the EU and the US do not require a visa for travel to Sharm El Sheikh if the visit is for fourteen days or less, although those travelling outside the Sinai area may still require a visa, which is purchasable for a small fee on arrival. Visitors are often ushered into a queue to buy a visa after entering the airport upon landing.

=== Flight incidents ===
On 23 August 2015, Thomson Airways Flight 476, approaching Sharm El Sheikh at the end of a flight from London Stansted Airport with 189 passengers aboard, took evasive action to avoid a missile traveling toward it. the missile missed the airliner by about 1,000 feet (300 meters), and the plane landed safely. A UK investigation concluded that the missile was an Egyptian armed forces missile that had strayed from a military exercise, although the Egyptian government said the flight was never at risk.

On 31 October 2015, while flying from Sharm El Sheikh to Saint Petersburg, Metrojet Flight 9268 was destroyed by a bomb above the northern Sinai following its departure from Sharm El Sheikh International Airport, killing all 224 people on board, Islamic State of Iraq and the Levant (ISIL) claimed responsibility for this incident. This caused the repatriation of British and Russian tourists from 5 November 2015. Following these events, many countries ordered all flights to Sharm El Sheikh be suspended. These suspensions were gradually lifted as the security situation improved, with the UK government ending its ban on direct flights on 22 October 2019. The process of lifting flight suspensions was completed on 9 August 2021, when the first direct flight from Russia since November 2015 (operated by Rossiya Airlines) landed at Sharm El Sheikh International Airport.

== Transport ==
Lampposts on El Salaam Street use solar power. Taxis and buses are numbered for safety.

Sharm's marina has been redeveloped for private yachts and sailing boats, with a passenger terminal for cruise ships.

The city is served by Sharm El Sheikh International Airport, the third largest airport in Egypt.

Sharm has frequent coach services to Cairo leaving from the Delta Sharm bus station.

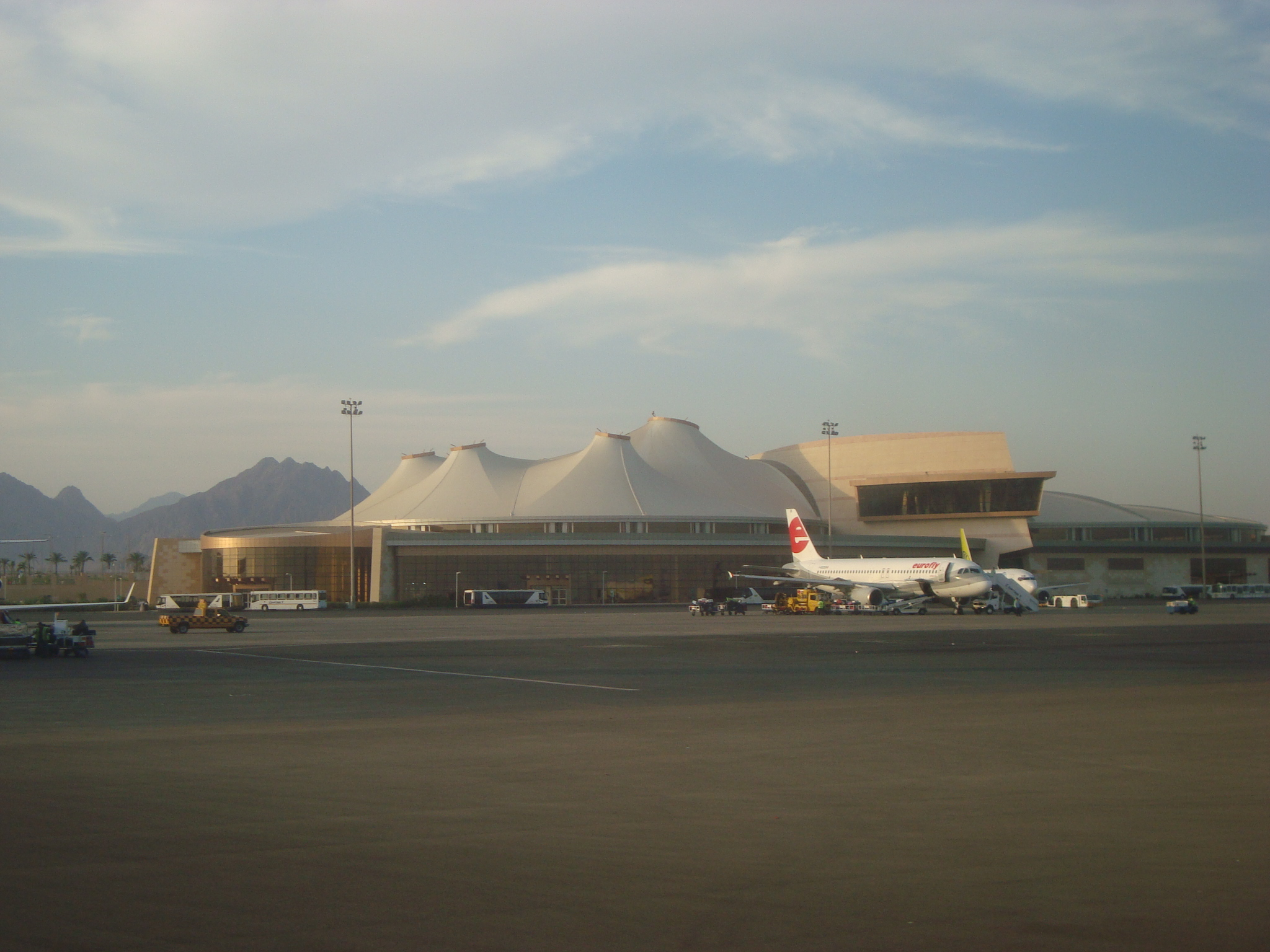
Sharm El Sheikh International Airport

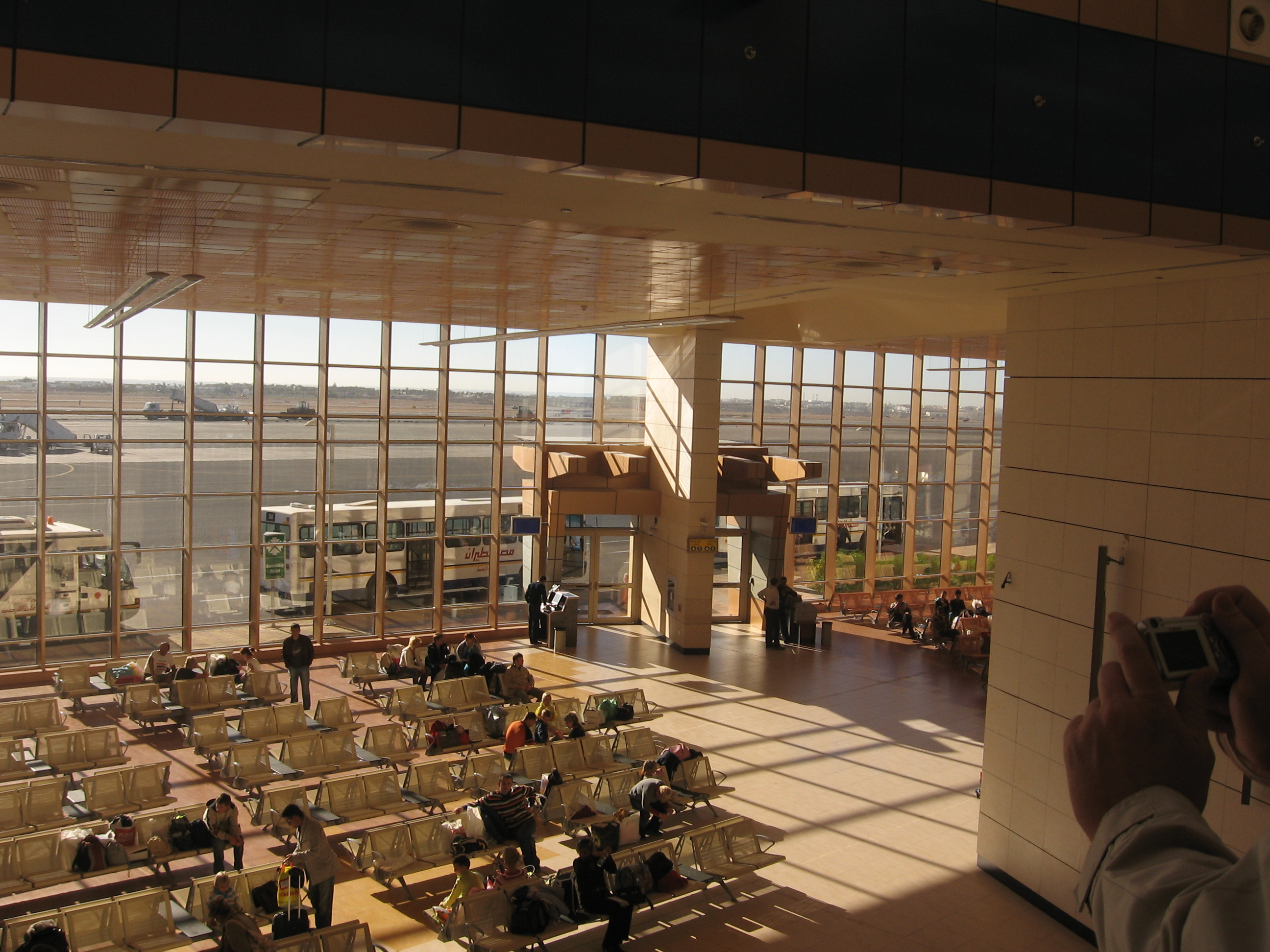
Departure Hall

== Water sports ==
Sharm El Sheikh has become a popular location for scuba diving as a result of its underwater scenery and warm waters. Other beach activities include snorkelling, windsurfing, kite-surfing, para-sailing, boating, and canoeing and stand up paddleboarding.

Ras Muhammad National Park is located at the southernmost tip of the Sinai Peninsula where the waters of the Red Sea and Gulf of Suez meet, producing strong currents and providing a habitat for diverse marine life. Two reefs popular with divers are Shark Reef, a vertical wall descending to over 800 metres (2,600 ft), and Yolanda Reef, the site of the wreck of the Yolanda.

The Straits of Tiran are located at the mouth of the Gulf of Aqaba and in a major shipping lane. There are four reefs there, each named after one of the British cartographers who first mapped them: Gordan, Thomas, Woodhouse and Jackson. In summer months, hammerhead sharks swim in schools near the reefs.

The Sharm El Sheikh Hyperbaric Medical Center was founded in 1993 by the Egyptian Ministry of Tourism with a grant from USAID, to assist with diving-related medical conditions.

=== Shark attacks ===
On 1 December 2010, four tourists − three Russians and a Ukrainian − were attacked and injured by an oceanic whitetip shark or sharks in three separate incidents off Sharm El Sheikh. One victim lost a leg, and another an arm. The Egyptian authorities claimed that the shark responsible for the attacks had been captured alive, but the identification was disputed by the diving industry, based on eyewitness and photographic evidence. Four days later, on 5 December, an elderly German woman was attacked and killed by a shark while snorkeling at the resort.

== Education ==
- St. Joseph Schools
- L'école française de Sharm el Sheikh EFSSH (FRENCH SCHOOL)
- Fayroz Experimental School
- Geel October School
- Sharm College
- Sharm British School
- King Salman International University, Sharm El Sheikh campus

== Twin towns ==
- Aqaba, Jordan (since December 2015)
- Swakopmund, Namibia (since June 2008)

== Gallery ==
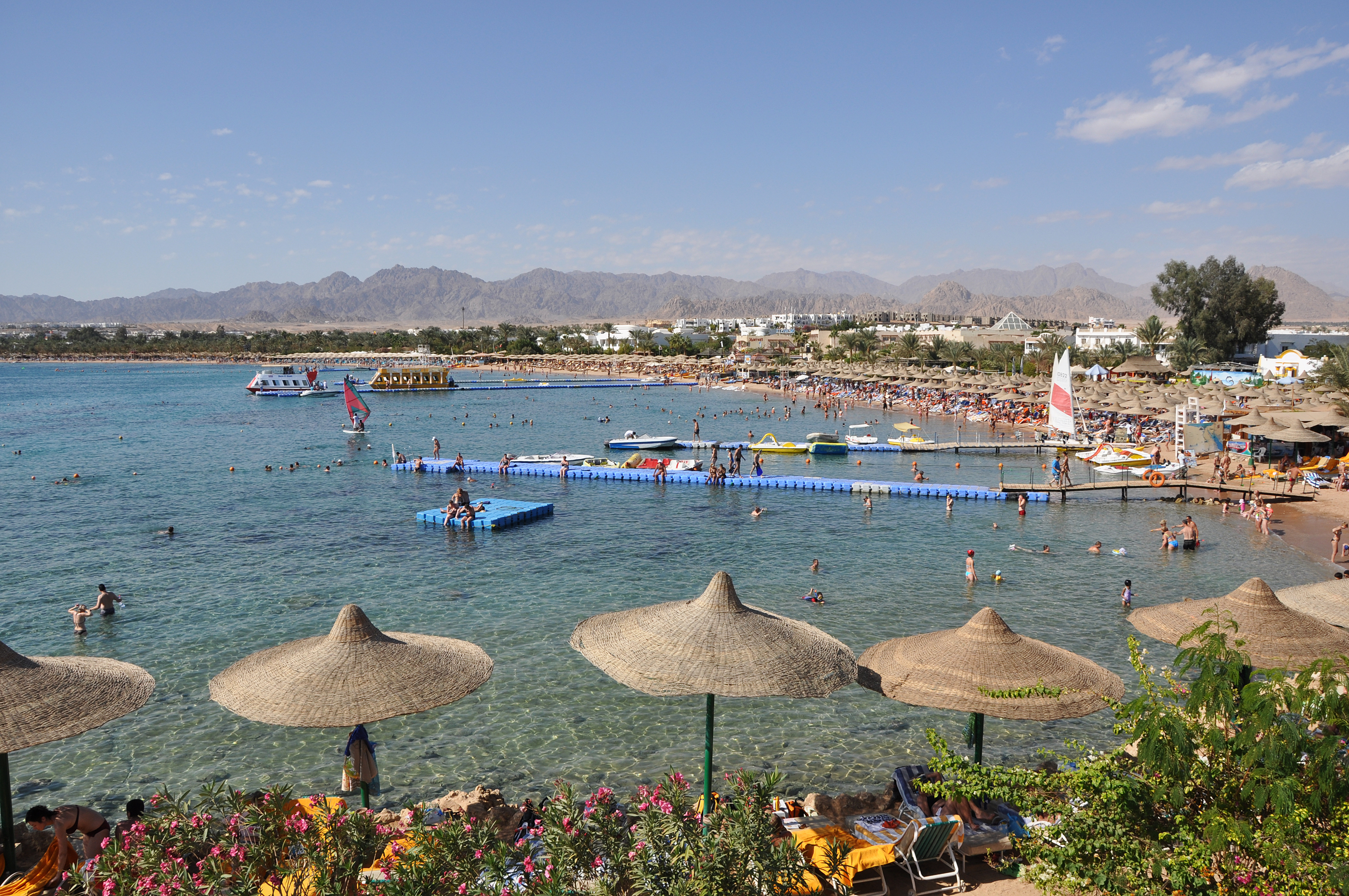
Naama Beach

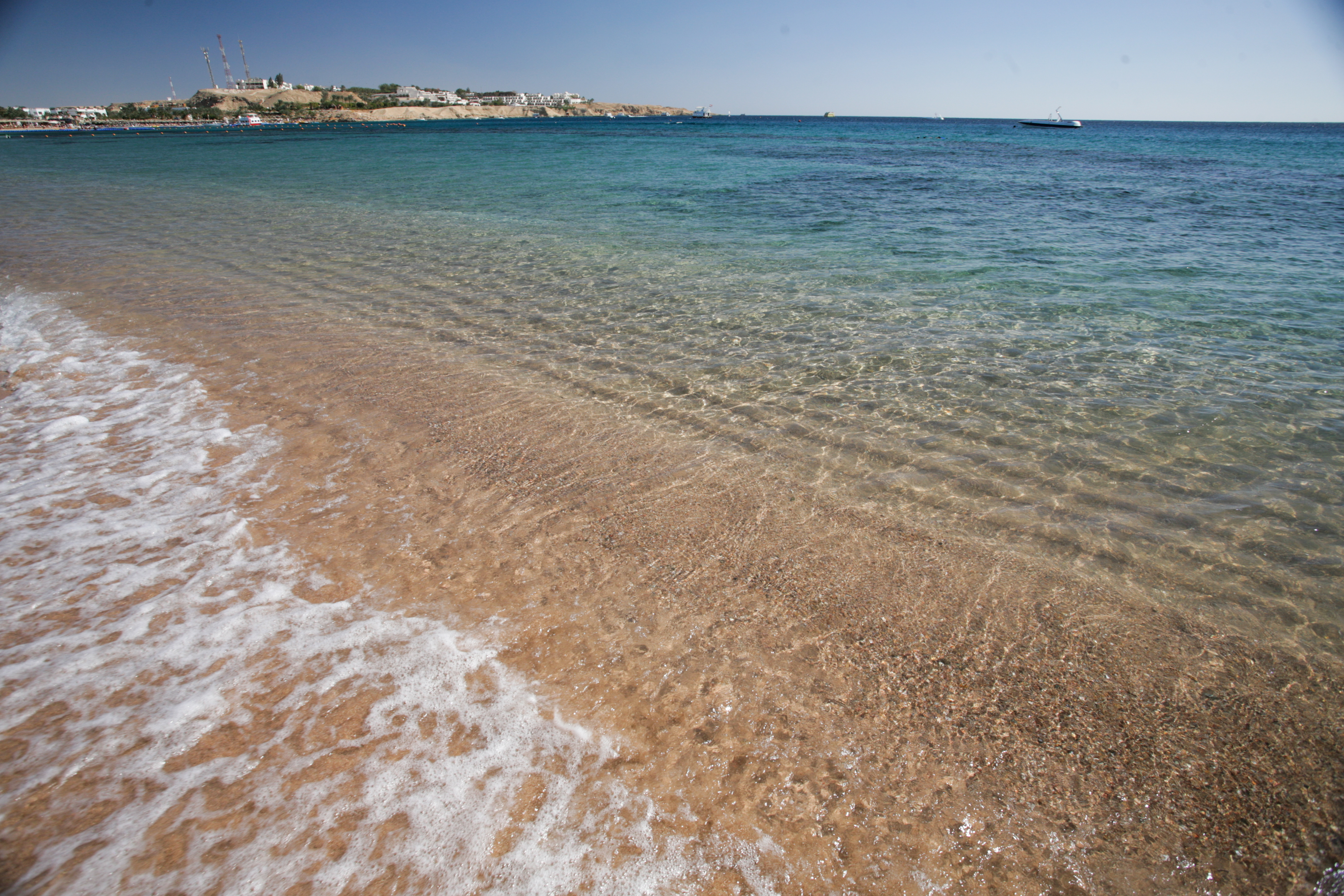
Naama Beach

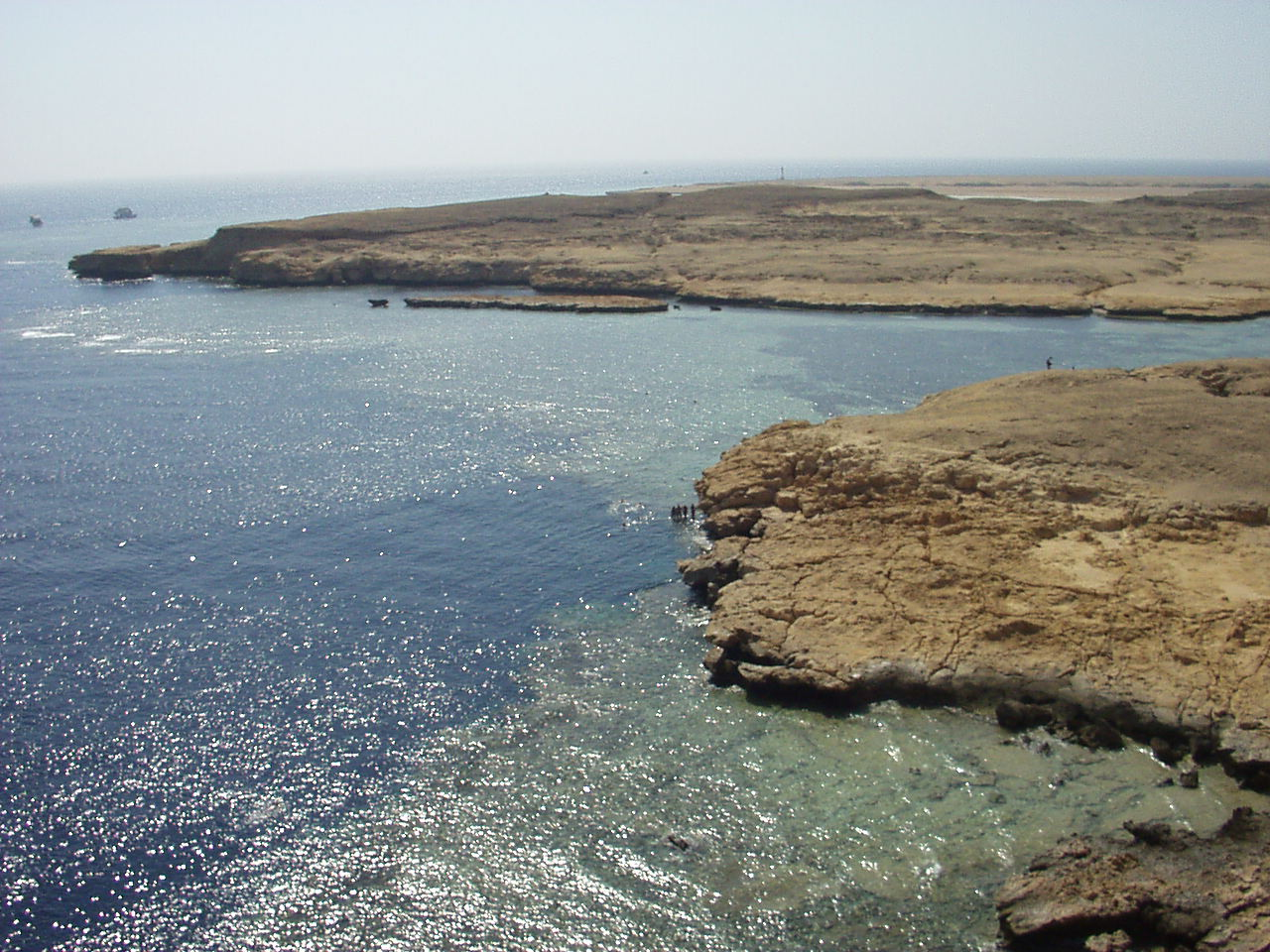
Ras Muhammad National Park

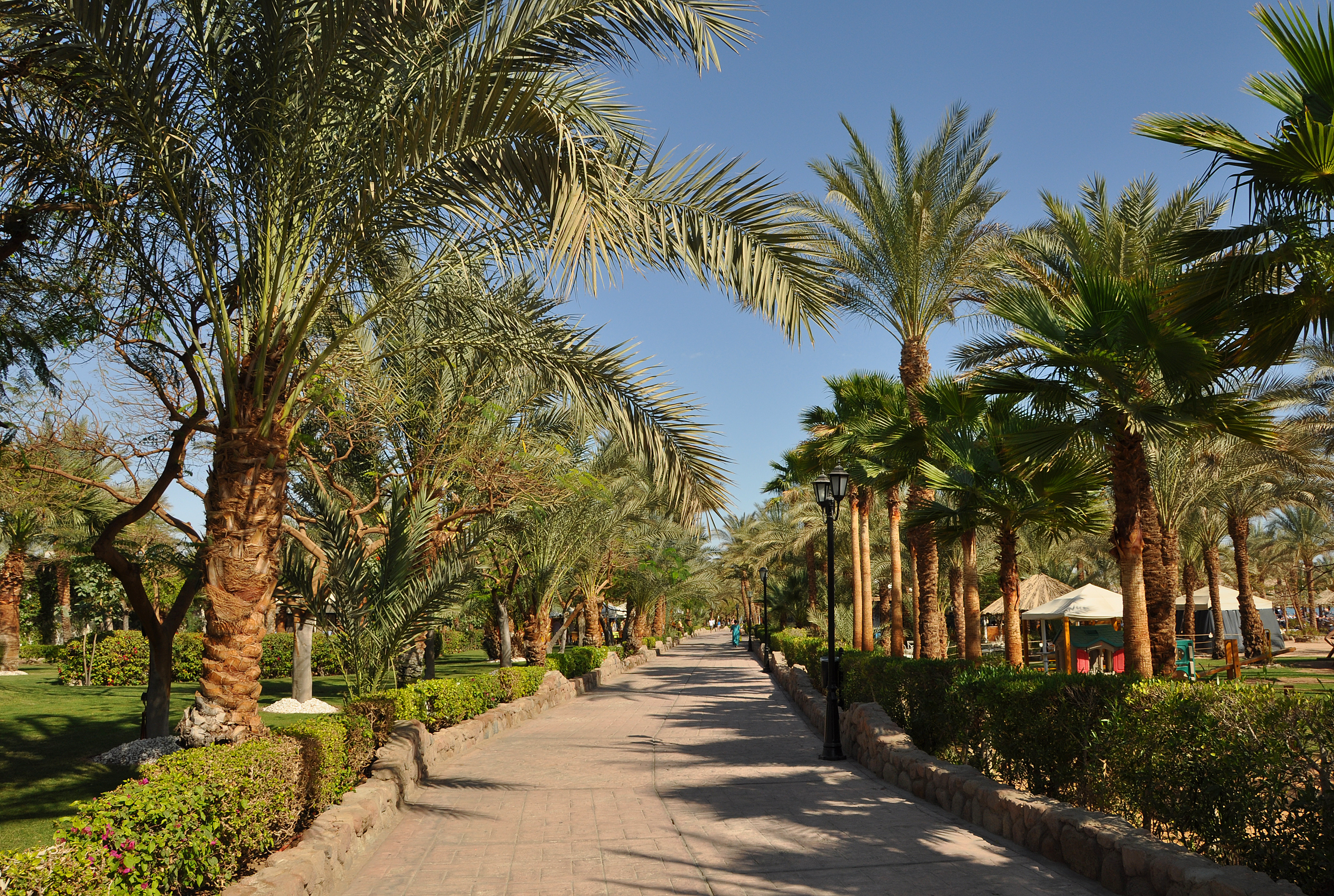
Naama Bay Promenade

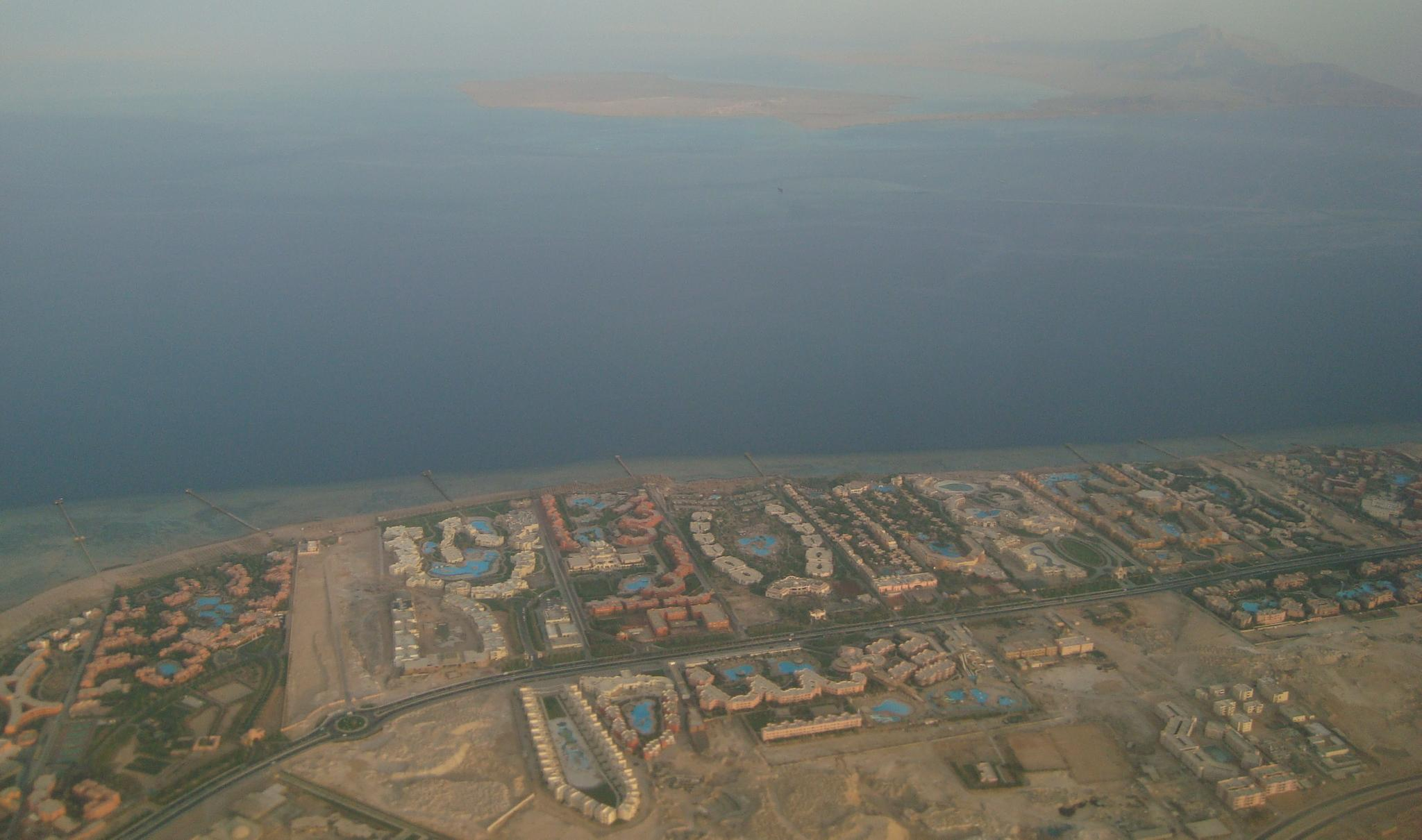
Aerial view

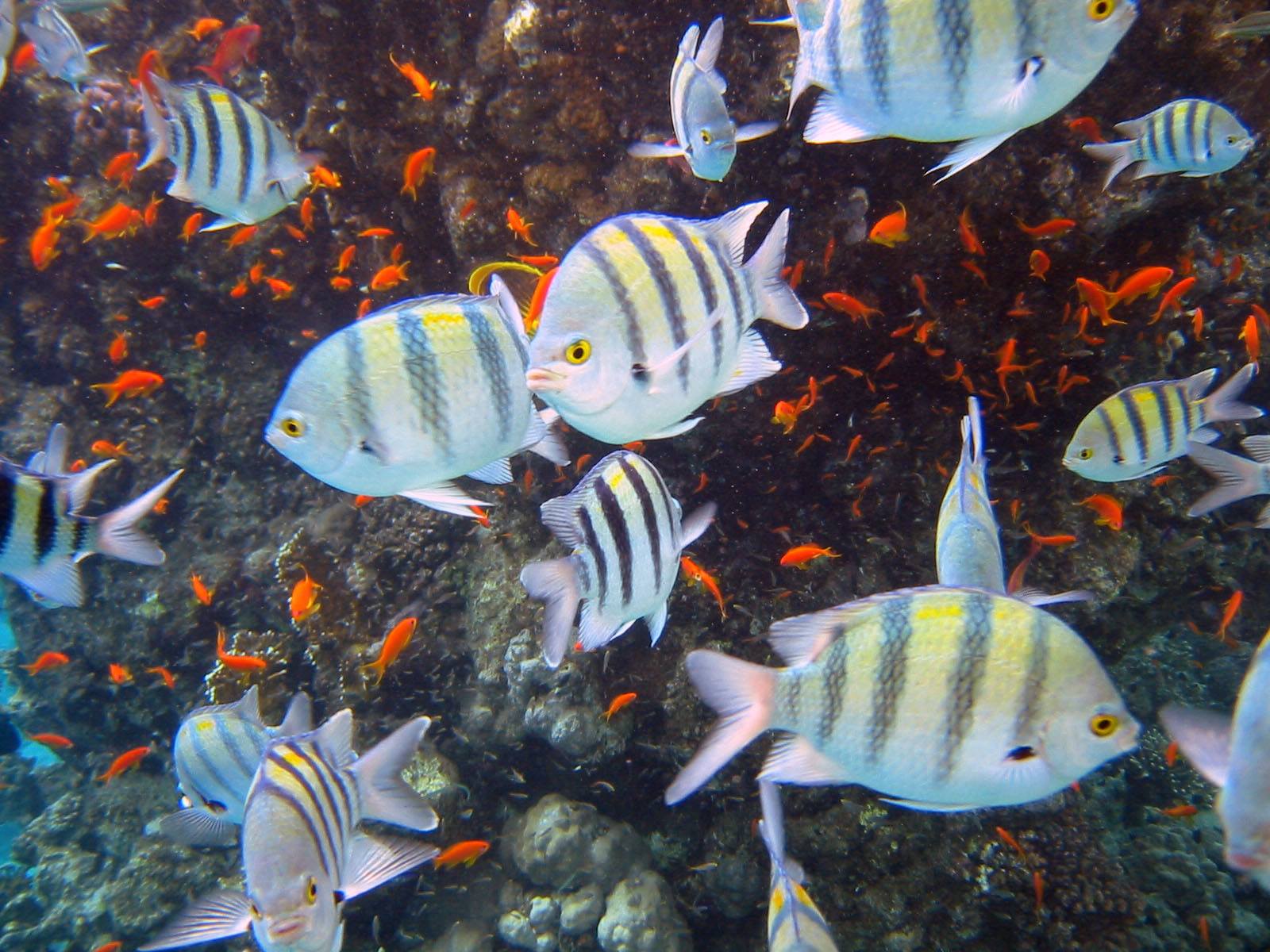
Red Sea reef

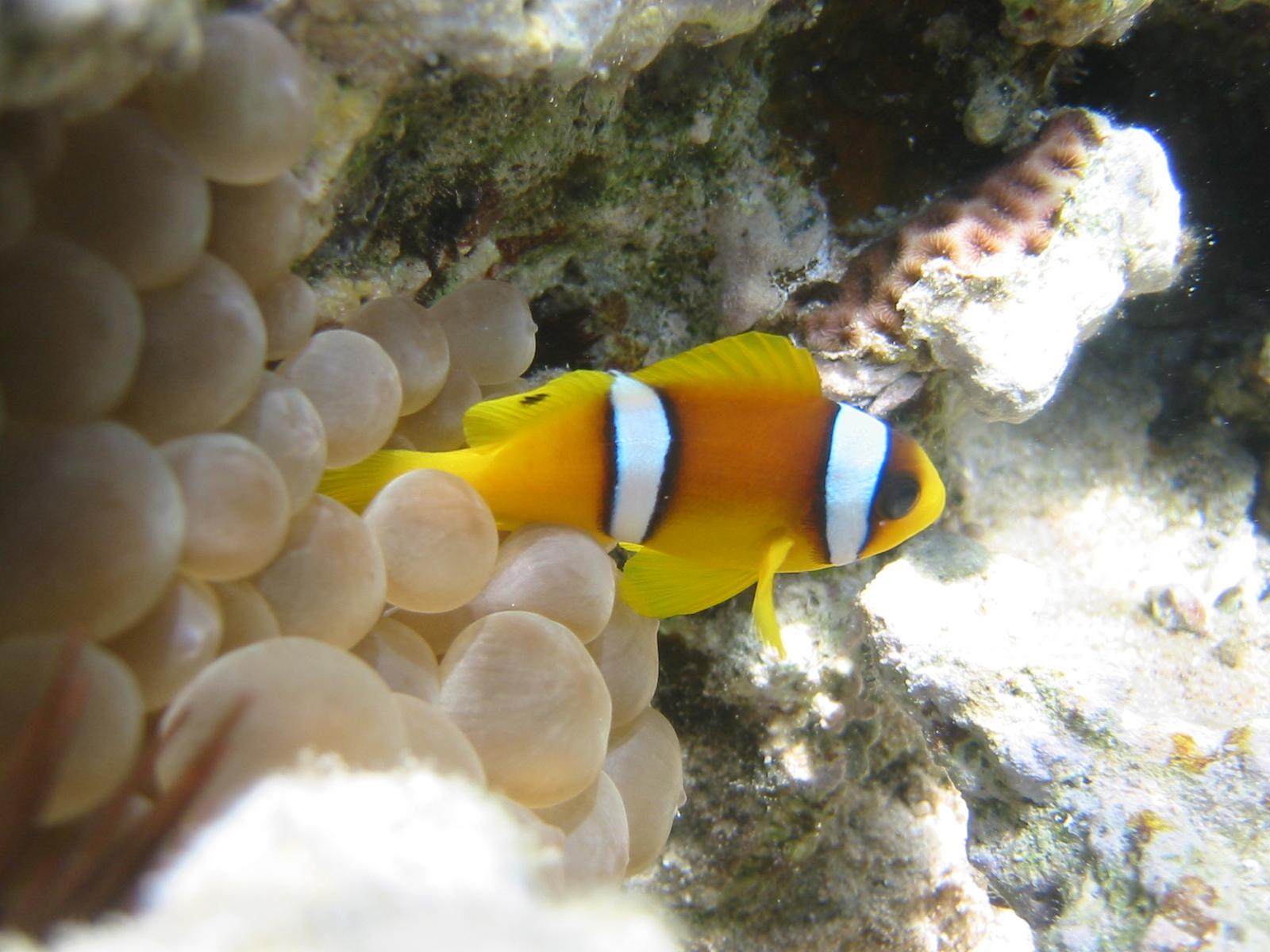
Red Sea reef

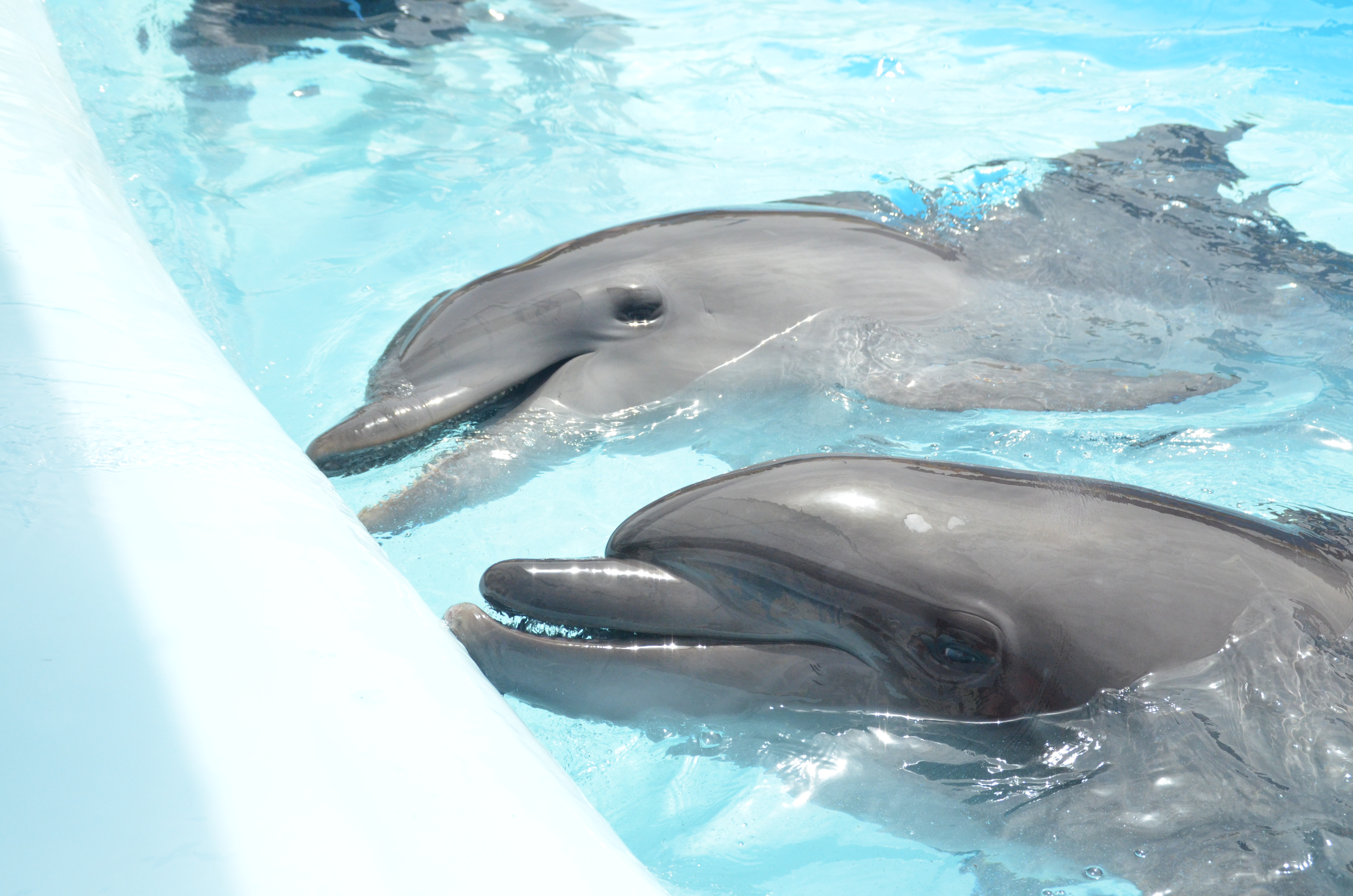
Bottle-nosed dolphins at a local dolphinarium

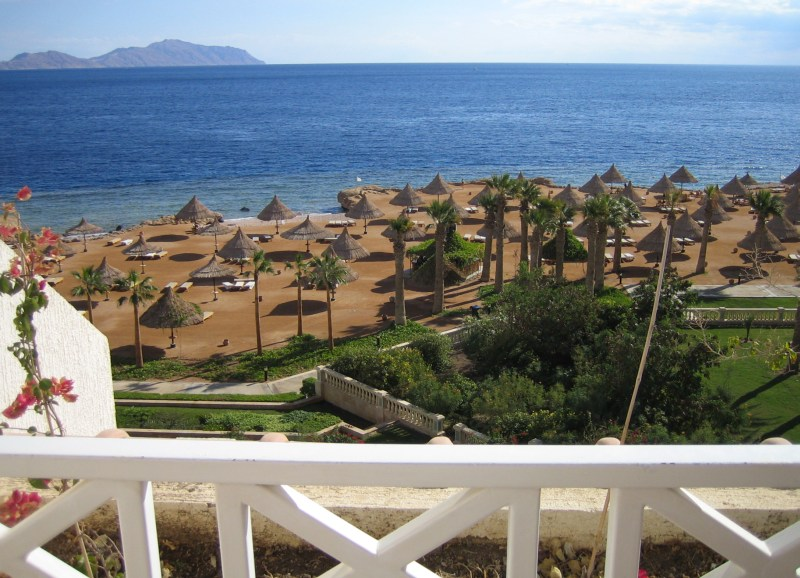
View of the Red Sea from a local resort hotel

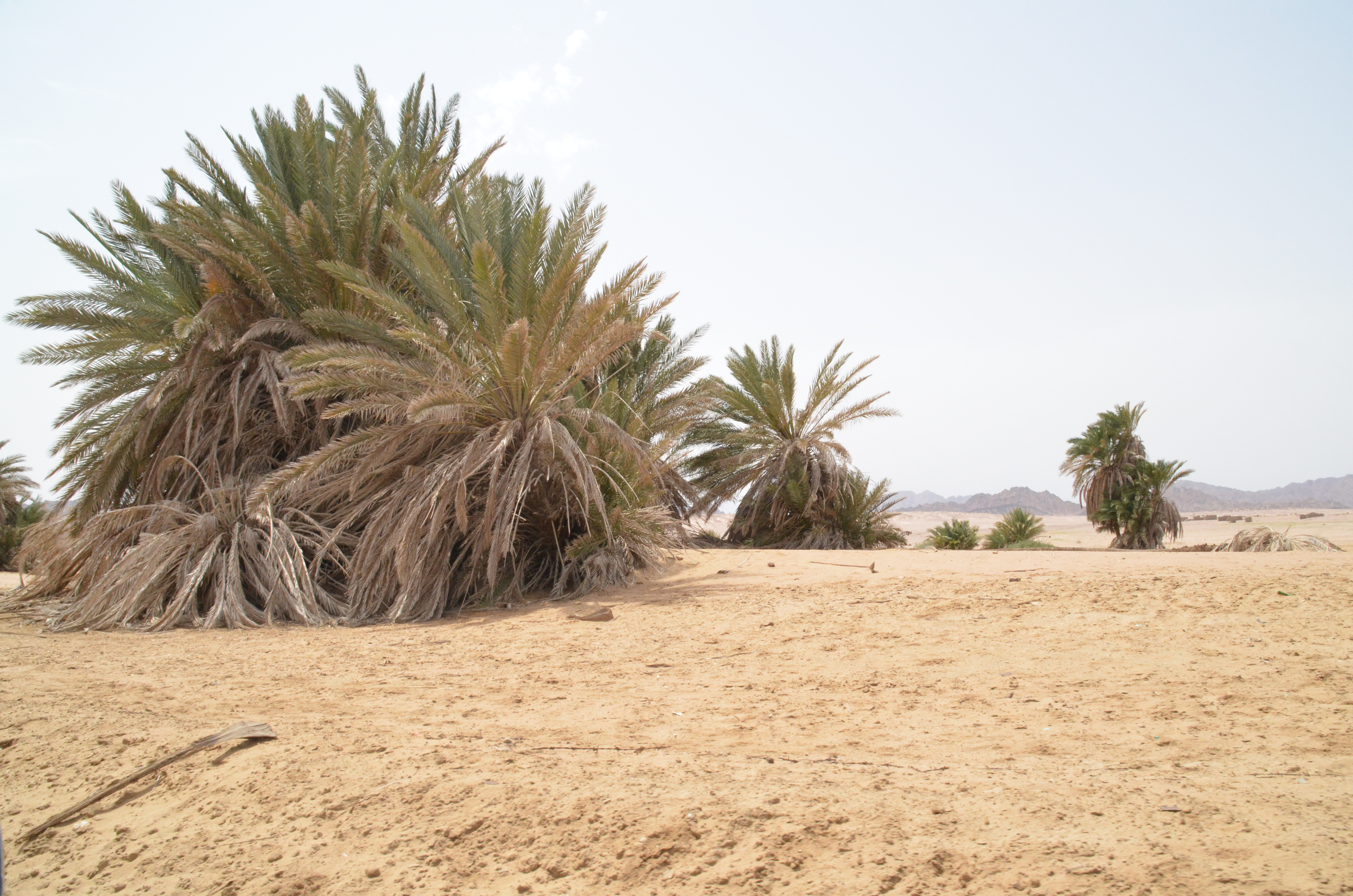
Nabq Protected Area

== See also ==
- Red Sea Riviera
- Sharm El Sheikh Memorandum
- South Sinai Hospital
- Ras Sedr
- Ras Muhammad National Park
- Dahab
- Taba
- Nuweiba
- Flash Airlines Flight 604
