= Ghodiyu =

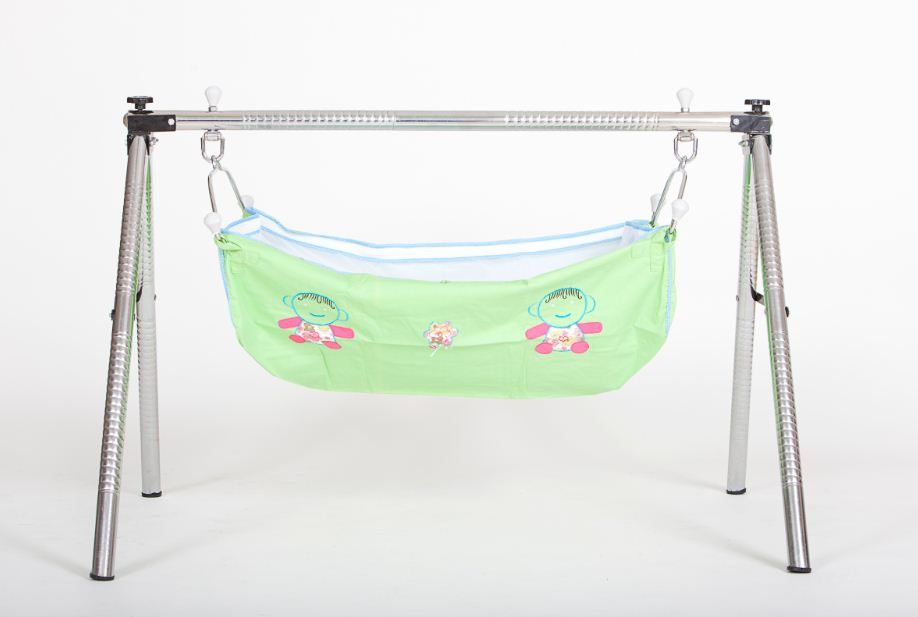
Modern commercial ghodiyu

A ghodiyu is an infant cradle formed of a wooden frame and a cloth hammock (jholi).

The device originated in Gujarat, and marwar region in India to help babies sleep. People in India have used this type of device for hundreds of years so that their baby can fall asleep quickly and get the rest they need while developing proper sleeping habits. A similar functioning device from the South India is called a jhula or parnu.

== Construction ==
A ghodiyu is a swing framework with a pair of legs on two ends of middle rod. This was originally made of wood (called sankheda), however, in modern times strong and durable material such as stainless steel is used during the manufacturing. The frame is often hooked onto a hammock which harnesses the young baby.

Typically, a ghodiyu is designed to have a low center of gravity. This enables a person to swing the child back and forth.

== Usage ==
People in India believe that the rocking motion soothes and relaxes the child and enables them to fall asleep quickly by replicating the comfort and security of the womb. Indian mothers claim that using a ghodiyu for their child can relieve baby colic symptoms due to the rocking motion which they believe relaxes the baby.
