= Nabq Protected Area =

Nature reserve in Egypt

NABQ Protected Area
- IUCN category VI (protected area with sustainable use of natural resources)
- Location within Egypt
- Location: South Sinai Governorate, Egypt
- Nearest city: Sharm el-Sheikh
- Coordinates: 28°16′41″N 34°22′48″E
- Area: 600 km^{2} (230 mi^{2})
- Established: 1992
- Website: www.sis.gov.eg/vr/protected/html/nabq.htm

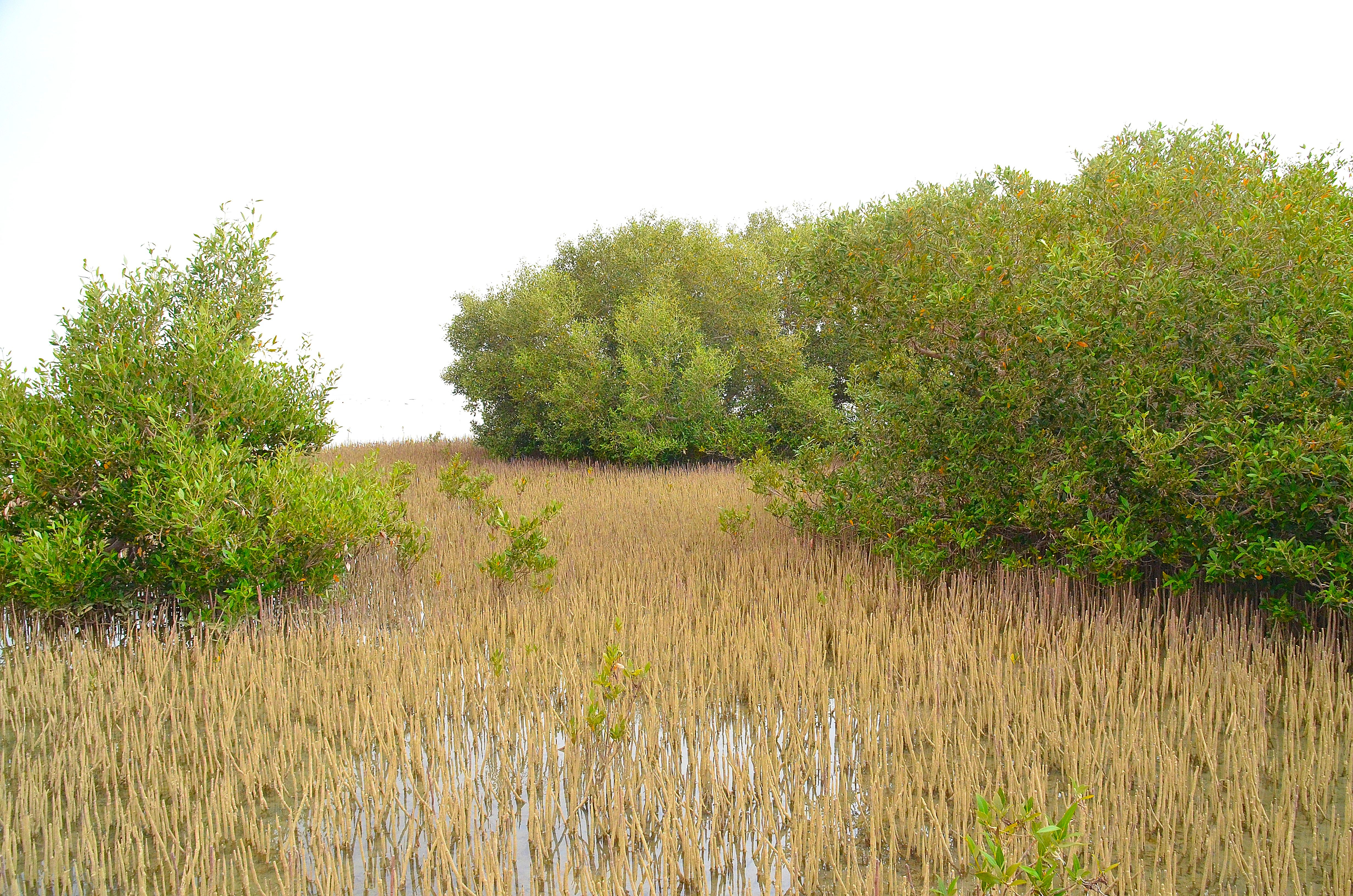
Nabq Reserve in South Sinai.

NABQ Protected Area (NPA) is a 600 km^{2} (230 mi^{2}) protected area located in the Egypt, South Sinai Governorate. It was established by the Prime Ministerial Decree no.1511/1992 and was extended by Decree 33/1996 where Dahab marine section was added to the protected area as a Dahab Environmentally Managed Area DEMA and finally having NABQ Managed Resource Protected Area which is known shortly as (NMRPA).

== Management institutional framework ==
The Protected Area Management Unit (PAMU) of Nabq is one of the Sinai Protected Area Net Work which is affiliated to the Central Department of the Protected Areas in Egypt under the Nature Conservation Sector of EEAA. The PAMU is responsible for controlling, developing protection actions, cooperation with stakeholders, enforcing the environmental laws (law 102/1983 and law 4/1994) and reporting to the Sinai Regional PA Office in Sharm El Sheikh, which in turn reports to NCS/EEAA in Cairo.

== NMRPA management objectives ==
The protected area had the status of Managed Resource Protected Area (MRPA) IUCN Category VI which is managed mainly for sustainable use of natural ecosystem. It is an area containing mostly unmodified natural systems, managed to ensure long-term protection and maintenance of biological diversity, while at the same time providing a sustainable flow of natural products and services to meet community needs.

Accordingly, the main proposed management objectives for NMRPA are:

- To maintain the natural and cultural resources in good conditions and conserve NPA biodiversity.
- To enhance the sustainable utility of natural resources in the PA.
- To promote NPA as a focal point for ecotourism in the region, and supporting socio-economic benefits to the local community
- To increase public understanding and appreciation of NPA natural and cultural heritage.

== Management issues, policies and actions ==
Twenty-five management issues have been identified. Management issues include problems that currently or potentially could degrade the values of NMRPA, as well as opportunities such as development of ecotourism, and obligations for the Protected Area Management Unit (PAMU) such as visitor safety. For each management issue, approaches and specific actions are identified within a comprehensive framework reflecting and reinforcing the primary objectives of the PA.

== Resources of NMRPA ==
NMRPA is characterized by a great diversity of habitats and ecosystems in a uniquely compact setting, representing a complete terrestrial/marine ecosystem which characterizes the Gulf of Aqaba coast. The region has a fascinating natural beauty and outstanding biological diversity. The coral reefs are among the best and most diverse in the Egyptian Red Sea (208 species of hard coral), and are the home for a significant number of fish (438 species) and marine invertebrates. They have enormous economic value, providing the basis for international tourism activities and sustaining local Bedouin fisheries.

NMRPA includes a significant stand of mangrove resources of Egypt, a mangle of Avicennia marina extends for 4.5 kilometers in a semi-continuous fringe which is considered the extreme northern mangrove in the Red Sea and Indian Ocean system, It forms important nurseries for economically important fish and nesting sites for many of the region's water birds. Substantial sea grass beds provide food for the threatened green sea turtle (Chelonia mydas), and dugong (Dugong dugon).

The interior of the PA is a complex pristine mountain wilderness, inhabited by diversified wildlife, including several endangered species, and representing enormous attractions for ecotourism activities. Wadi El Keed watershed is one of the largest drainage basins to the Gulf of Aqaba on the Egyptian side. It can be considered as the best-vegetated wadi all over the Gulf, having the biggest aggregation of the Arak Sand Dunes (Salvadora persica) representing a unique vegetation.

There are more than 20 globally threatened species known in NMRPA. The most significant species for which NMRPA can make an important contribution towards their global conservation are marine turtles, sharks, dugong, osprey (Pandion haliaetus), white-eyed gull (Larus leucophthalmus), dorcas gazelle (Gazella dorcas), and Nubian ibex (Capra nubiana).

The area is inhabited by local peoples (Bedouin) belonging to El Mezina Tribe, who still practice their traditional lifestyle largely in harmony with their environment and mainly live on fishing, pasture and tourism. The area has an archaeological site at Wadi Saialet Dalal has been made in the old time by the Bedouin. Natural systems are still intact, and no development occurred in the area, except for mining and quarrying for albite at Wadi El Samra and the old inactive copper mine which may be activated in the near future.
