= Zulfiqar (disambiguation) =

Zulfiqar (also Zulfikar and other Romanisations) or Dhu al-Fiqar was the legendary sword of the Islamic leader Ali.

Zulfiqar may also refer to:

== People ==
=== Given name ===
- Julfikar Ahmed Bhutto (born 1970), Indian politician
- Julfikar Ali Manik, Bangladeshi journalist and writer
- Md. Julfiker Murtuja Chowdhury, Bangladeshi politician
- Zulfikar Ali Bhutto (1928–1979), Pakistani barrister, politician, and statesman
- Zulfikar Ali Bhutto Jr. (born 1990), Pakistani visual artist, politician, and human-rights activist
- Zulfikar Pasha Čengić (died 1846), Ottoman Bosnian nobleman and a military leader
- Zulfikar Ghose (1935–2022), Pakistani writer
- Zulfikar Haidar (1899–1987), Bangladeshi poet
- Zulfikar Ali Khan, multiple people
- Zulfikar Matin (born 1946), Bangladeshi novelist and writer
- Zulfikar Mustapha, Guyanese politician
- Zulfikar Shariff (born 1971), Singaporean-born Australian author, political activist, and dissident
- Zulfiqar Ahmad Dhillon (born 1948), Pakistani politician and former Brigadier in the Pakistan Army
- Zulfiqar Ahmad Naqshbandi (1953–2025), Pakistani Islamic scholar
- Zulfiqar Ahmed, multiple people
- Zulfiqar Ali, multiple people
- Zulfiqar Babar (born 1978), Pakistani cricketer, right-handed batsman and left arm spinner
- Zulfiqar Sattar Bachani, Pakistani politician
- Zulfiqar Bhutta, Pakistani physician
- Zulfiqar Butt (born 1971), Pakistani cricketer
- Zulfiqar Hussain Dogar, Pakistani footballer
- Zulfiqar Ghouri (born 1955), Pakistani politician
- Zulfiqar Gilani, Pakistani journalist and author
- Zulfiqar Halepoto (born 1970), Pakistani writer
- Zulfiqar Hameed (born 1970), Pakistani police officer
- Zulfiqar Jan (born 1979), Pakistani cricketer, batsman and wicketkeeper
- Zulfiqar Khan Nusrat Jung (1657–1713), Mughal nobleman
- Zulfiqar Jabbar Khan (born 1980), Pakistani composer, singer-songwriter, music producer, and guitarist
- Zulfiqar Mirza, (born 1954), a Pakistani politician affiliated with the Pakistan Peoples Party
- Zulfiqar Naqvi (born 1965), Indian poet
- Zulfiqar Parkar (born 1957), Indian cricketer
- Zulfiqer Russell (born 1977), Bangladeshi musician
- Zulfiqar Shah (born 1977), Pakistani journalist and civil rights activist

=== Surname ===
- Ahmed Zulfikar (1952–2010), Egyptian entrepreneur
- Ahmed Mourad Bey Zulfikar (1888–1945), Egyptian police commissioner
- Asad Zulfiqar (born 1997), Dutch cricketer
- Dina Zulfikar (born 1962), Egyptian environmentalist
- Mahmoud Zulfikar (1914–1970), Egyptian filmmaker
- Mikaal Zulfiqar (born 1981), a Pakistani British actor and model
- Said Pasha Zulfikar, former Grand Chamberlain of Egypt
- Salah Zulfikar (1926–1993), Egyptian actor and producer
- Saqib Zulfiqar (born 1997), Dutch cricketer
- Sikander Zulfiqar (born 1997), Dutch cricketer
- Zulfikar family, an Egyptian family

== Weapon ==
- Zulfiqar (tank), an Iranian-made Main Battle Tank
- PNS Zulfiqar, the name of three ships of the Pakistan navy
- Zolfaghar (missile), an Iranian ballistic missile

== Places and settlements ==
- Zulfiqarabad, a Pakistan development project
- Deh-e Zu ol Faqar, also known as Deh Zulfiqār, a village in Iran

== Organisations ==
- Al-Zulfiqar, Pakistani leftist insurgent organisation based in Afghanistan
- Shaheed Zulfiqar Ali Bhutto Institute of Science and Technology, a private research university
- Zulficar and Partners, Egyptian law firm
- Zulfikar ltd., Egyptian landscape company
- Order of Zolfaghar, Iranian military order

== Fiction ==
- Zulfiqar (film), an Indian film
- Zulfikar, a fictional character played by Shekhar Suman and Adhyayan Suman in the 2024 Indian TV series Heeramandi

== See also ==
- Zulficar
