= Zulficar =

Zulficar is a surname. Notable people with the surname include:

- Ezz El-Dine Zulficar (1919–1963), Egyptian film director
- Mona Zulficar, Egyptian lawyer and activist
- Youssef Zulficar Pasha (1866–1965), Egyptian judge and diplomat
- Zeinab Zulficar (1895–1990), Egyptian noble

== See also ==
- Zulfiqar
- Zulfiqar (disambiguation)
