= Mona Zulficar =

Egyptian lawyer and human rights activist

- مني ذو الفقار
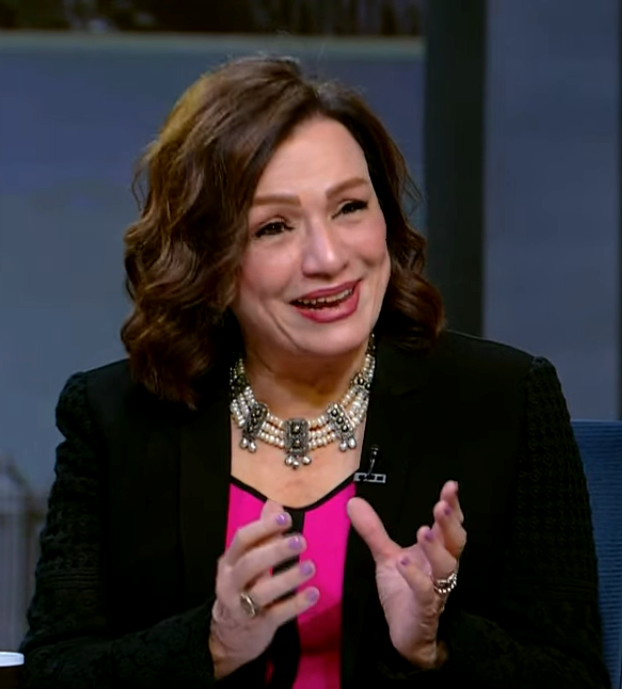
- Zulficar in 2022
- Born: Mona Salah El-Din Zulficar; Cairo, Egypt
- Education: Cairo University
- Occupation: Lawyer
- Children: 1
- Father: Salah Zulfikar
- Relatives: Ahmed Zulfikar (brother); Ahmed Mourad Bey Zulfikar (Grandfather); Ezz El-Dine Zulfikar (uncle); Mahmoud Zulfikar (uncle); Dina Zulfikar (cousin)
- Family: Zulfikar family
- Honours: Legion of Honour

Mona Salah El-Din Zulficar is an Egyptian lawyer and human rights activist. She was included in the Forbes 2025 list of the "100 most powerful businesswomen in the Arab region".

She participates in drafting new laws and developing existing laws related to economic legislation; Zulficar is an active advocate for human rights and women, both locally and internationally, campaigning for a new family law, to modernize the legal environment in Egypt, to keep pace with the social changes related to the situation of women, and to provide an open, liberal vision for the future of the country.

== Early life ==
Mona Salah El-Din Zulficar was born in Abbassia neighborhood of Cairo to the well-off Zulfikar family. Her father Salah Zulfikar (1926-1993) who was a police officer at the time, became a famous film actor and producer, and her mother Nafisa Bahgat was a socialite. She had one brother, Ahmed Zulfikar (1952-2010) who was an engineer and businessman.

== Positions held ==
- Founder and chair of the executive committee, Zulfikar & Partners Law firm, 2009 to date.
- Partner and chairperson of the Board of Directors - Shalakany Law Firm, 2006–2009.
- Vice-chairman of the Advisory Committee of the United Nations Human Rights Council.
- Member of the National Council for Human Rights in Egypt.
- Chairman of the Board of Directors, EFG Hermes, 2004 to date.
- Member of the Board of Directors of the Central Bank of Egypt.
- President of the Women's Association to improve health.
- President of Al Tadamun Microfinance Foundation.
- Head of the International Women's Advisory Group at the World Bank.
- Member of the National Council for Women (2000-2006).
- Member of the Board of Directors of the International Population Communications Organization.
- Member of the Board of Directors of Banque du Caire, appointed by the Egyptian Prime Minister from 2000 to 2003.
- Member of the Egyptian American Business Council.
- Member of the advisory board of the World Bank for the Middle East and North Africa.
- Member and vice-president of the United Nations Human Rights Council.
- Member of the Board of Trustee's of the Women and Memory Foundation.
- She was nominated to take over the Ministry of Human Rights and Population Services in the government of Dr. Ahmed Shafik, the former Prime Minister.

== Personal life ==
Zulficar is married and has one daughter, Dr. Ingy Badawy; a lawyer.

== Honours ==
- Egypt: Honoring from President Abdel Fattah El-Sisi of Egypt.
- France: Knight of the Legion d'honneur from the French government.

== Recognition and awards ==
- The first Egyptian and the first woman to win the International Financial Law Review (IFLR) life time award.
- Chosen in December 1994 by Time magazine as one of the 100 Young Leaders of the Twentieth Century in the world.
- Named as an Eminent Practitioner in Banking and Finance by Chambers and Partners.
- CEWLA Award for Outstanding Role in Passing the Khula Law, 2003.
- United Nations Development Award on International Women's Day, Cairo, 1995.
- Honoring the Governor of Cairo for the Defense of Women's Rights, 2000.
- Ranking in top 20 among the 100 most powerful businesswomen in the Arab region, according to Forbes classification.

== See also ==
- Economy of Egypt
- List of Egyptians

== Further sources ==
- Office of the High Commissioner for Human Rights: Mona Zulficar biography
