= Shirish Saraf =

Indian businessman

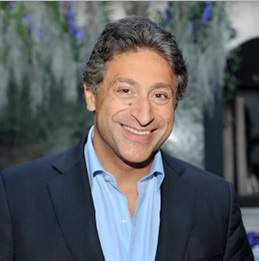
- Saraf in 2011
- Born: 12 October 1967 (age 58)
- Occupations: Private Equity Investor and Entrepreneur
- Known for: Investing, Finance, Banking, Private Equity & Philanthropy

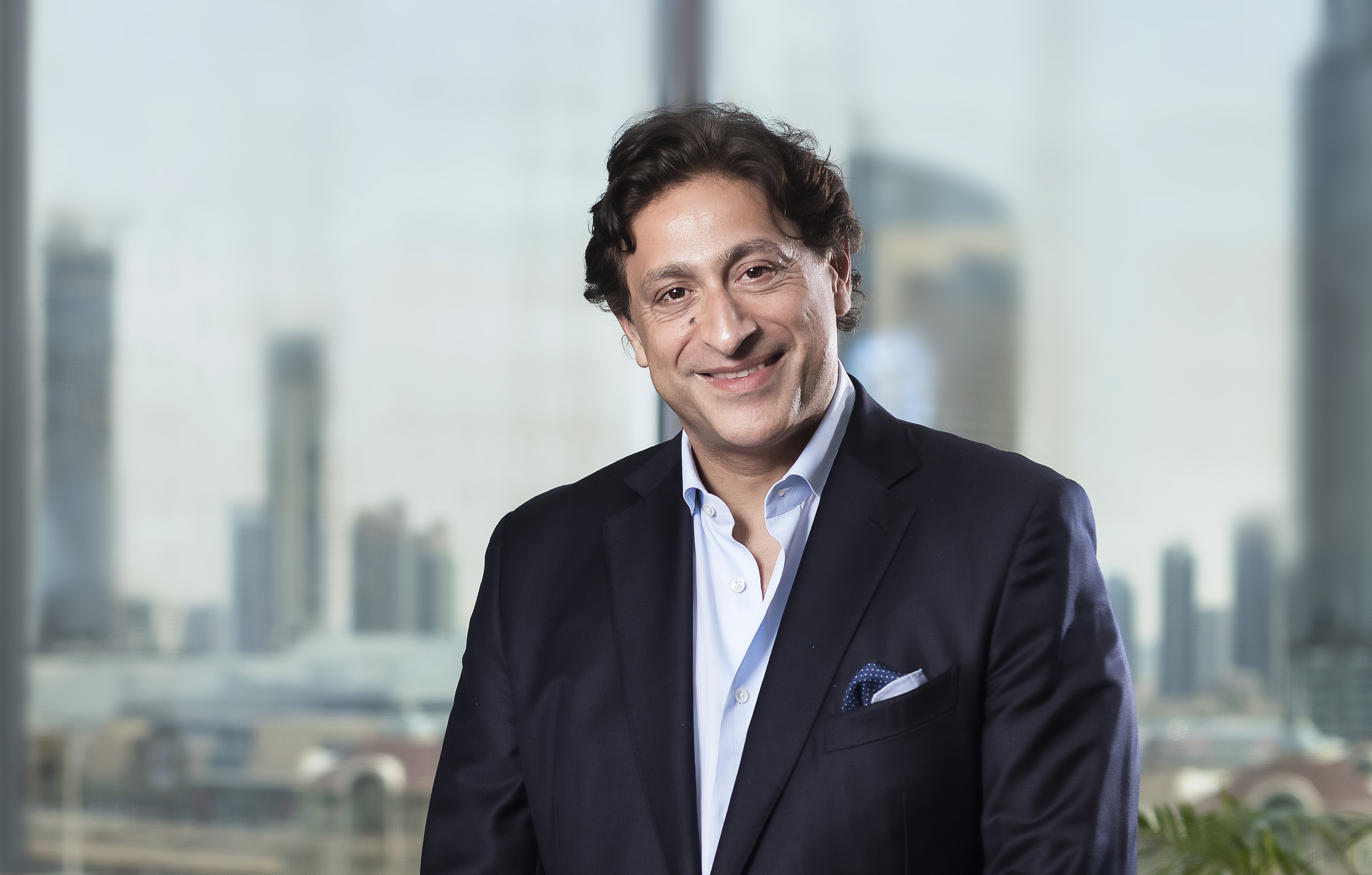
Shirish Saraf in 2016

Shirish Saraf is the founder, vice chairman and member of the compensation committee of Samena Capital. He is also the investment manager and director of the Samena Special Situations Funds and Samena Limestone Holdings.

Prior to founding Samena Capital, Saraf was a co-founder and managing director of Abraaj Capital, which grew to become one of the largest global private equity firms managing in excess of US$6 billion. During his tenure at Abraaj Capital he was involved in several landmark private equity and block purchase transactions such as the buyout of Aramex, EFG Hermes, Egyptian Fertilizer Company, Arabtec, ONIC, SAOG Oman, Amwal Capital (Qatar) and also, he pioneered and managed the special situations funds.

In June 2014, Saraf led the acquisition of a significant stake in RAK Ceramics PSC, a company listed on the Abu Dhabi Securities Exchange and one of the world's largest ceramics manufacturers with annual revenues of approximately US$1 billion.

Saraf holds numerous directorship and leadership positions across Samena's portfolio companies. He is currently the vice chairman of the board of directors and chairman of the executive committee of RAK Ceramics, where previously he was the chairman of the audit committee and member of the remuneration and nominations committee. Saraf is also a board member of RAK Logistics (previously Alliance Global Logistics). In July 2016, Saraf became a member of the board of directors for Mahindra Two Wheelers Limited, India and in August 2016, he was appointed to the board of directors of Tejas Networks, India. In November 2016, Saraf was appointed to the board of directors of Dynamatic Technologies Limited, India.

Saraf has previously held numerous directorships, including Aramex Holdings, Abraaj Capital, Commercial Bank of Oman SAOG, EFG Hermes and Amwal Capital (Qatar).

In 1998, Saraf founded Oriel Investment Company, which emerged as one of the leading regional corporate finance firms in a short period of time. While at Oriel Investment, he became one of the largest founding shareholders of US-based E Ink Corporation, the world's leading developer and provider of electronic paper and displays.

In September 2013, Asian Investor listed Saraf as one of Asia's 25 most influential people in private equity.

== Education ==
Saraf was educated at Charterhouse School (England) and the London School of Economics.

== Philanthropy ==
Saraf and his wife are actively involved with the Little Dreams Foundation, a Geneva-based charity that supports underprivileged children with outstanding talent in areas such as music and sports.

He is also on the world advisory board of WorldView, a Commonwealth Broadcasting Association Project that aims to improve UK public understanding and awareness of the developing world via the mainstream broadcast and digital media. WorldView supports upcoming filmmakers that produce films with a social message in developing countries, with an aim to unite the world. WorldView is partnering with Games For Change, a project that produces digital video games and mobile phone applications to raise the awareness about developmental issues across borders and fatal diseases such as typhoid and malaria.

During his time at Abraaj, Saraf played a key role in the development of the London School of Economics Middle East Centre, instituting scholarships for 50 promising students from the region.

In 2015, Saraf founded the Shirish Saraf Scholarship at Charterhouse House School, providing an education for underprivileged children with all around excellence.

In 2016, Saraf established the Samena Foundation an initiative set up to facilitate global charitable and benevolent causes.

== Samena Capital ==
- Samena Capital
