= Zulfiqar Ali =

Zulfiqar Ali may refer to:

== People ==
- Zulfiqar Ali (Kenyan cricketer) (born 1947), Kenyan cricketer
- Zulfiqar Ali (Khyber Pakhtunkhwa politician), Pakistani politician
- Zulfiqar Ali (mayor) (born 1965), English politician
- Zulfiqar Ali (Pakistani cricketer) (1969–2003), Pakistani cricketer
- Zulfiqar Ali Atray (1963/64–2025), Pakistani singer
- Zulfiqar Ali Behan, Pakistani politician
- Zulfiqar Ali Bhatti, multiple people
- Zulfiqar Ali Bukhari (1904–1975), Pakistani broadcaster
- Zulfiqar Ali Deobandi (1822–1904), Indian Islamic scholar, educator, and writer
- Zulfiqar Ali Kalhoro (born 1977), Pakistani anthropologist, research scholar, and author
- Zulfiqar Ali Khan (1930–2005), Pakistani air force general
- Zulfiqar Ali Khan Magsi (born 1954), Pakistani politician
- Zulfiqar Ali Khosa (1935–2026), Pakistani politician
- Zulfiqar Ali Sangi (born 1973), Pakistani jurist
- Zulfiqar Ali Shah, Pakistani politician
- Zulfiqar Ali Shah (footballer) (born 1980), Pakistani footballer
- Zulfiqar Ali Shah Jamote (1941–2011), Pakistani politician
