= Samadhi (shrine) =

Indian temple commemorating the dead

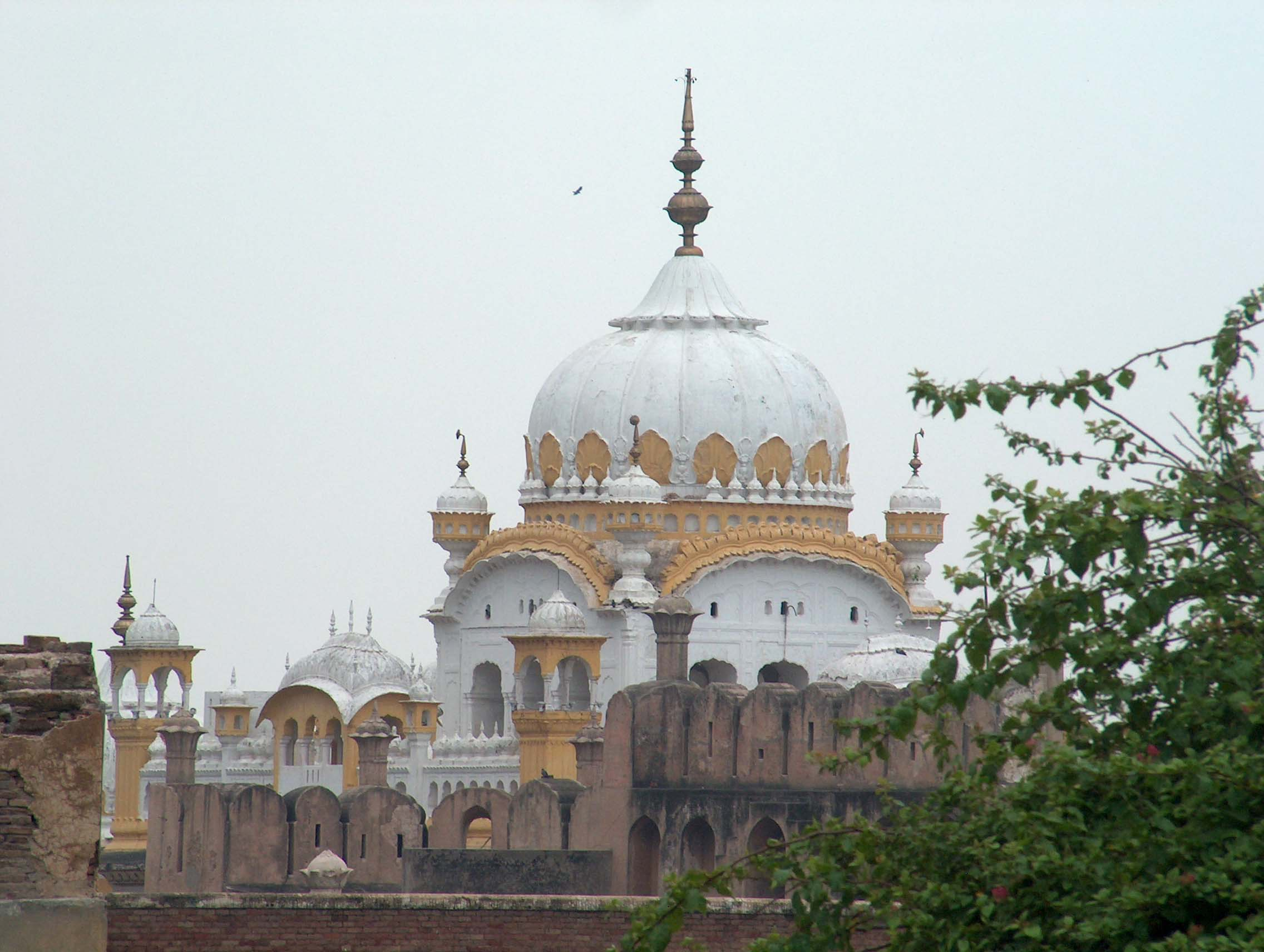
Samadhi of the Sikh Maharajah Ranjit Singh in Lahore

In Hinduism, Sikhism, and Sufism a samadhi (samādhi) or samadhi mandir is a temple, shrine, or memorial commemorating the dead (similar to a tomb or mausoleum), (Note: The name of these shrines can also be spelt as 'samadh' or 'smadh'.) which may or may not contain the body of the deceased. Samadhi sites are often built in this way to honour people regarded as saints or gurus in Hindu religious traditions, wherein such souls are said to have passed into mahāsamādhi, or were already in samadhi (a state of meditative consciousness) at the time of death.

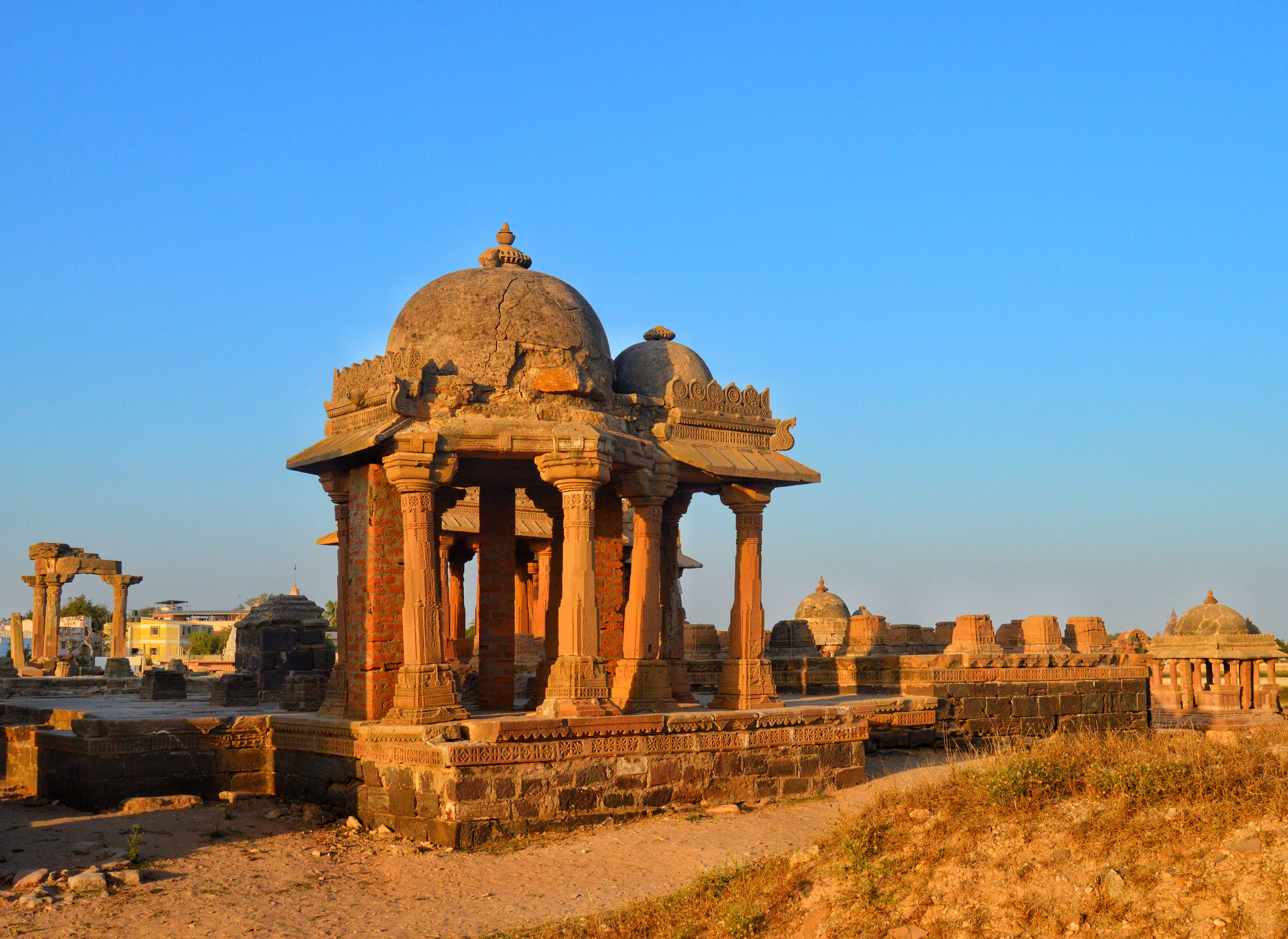
Ruined group of samadhi for the rajas of Kutch and their courts, at Bhuj, Gujarat

In Sikhism, the term "samadhi" is used for the mausoleums of eminent figures, both religious and political. Examples include the Samadhi of Ranjit Singh in Lahore, and that of Maharaja Sher Singh near Lahore. Hindu equivalents are usually called chatri, although those for Maratha Empire figures also often use "samadhi". The forms of structure called "samadhi" vary greatly. The word is sometimes used for a memorial stele, also called paliya, a type of hero stone once common in parts of Gujarat and Sindh. It may be used for small memorial buildings such as open chatri, often placed around a temple. In Punjab, samadhis are also known as marhī.

The tradition of India is cremation for most Hindu people at the time of death, while samadhi is generally reserved for very advanced souls, such as yogis and saints, who have already been "purified by the fire of yoga" or who are believed to have been in the state of samadhi at the time of death. Samadhi usually involves inhumation rather than cremation.

== Regional and religious styles ==
According to Zulfiqar Ali Kalhoro, Sikh samadhis are often decorated with frescoes, which usually depict both Sikh and Hindu themes, such as the Sikh gurus or Indic deities. During Sikh-rule, samadhis tended to be costly, grand structures with ribbed domes and elaborate paintings. However, Sikh samadhis erected during British-rule tended to be simpler, with fewer frescoes and shikhara or squat domes. Zulfiqar Ali Kalhoro also identifies a regional Pothohari style of samadhis, which usually contain consisting of tanks (sarovars), step-wells (baolis), ribbed domes, high-neck drums, marble door frames, and are either square or octagonal in-shape. The Bharatpur rulers at Govardhan Hill built chhatri cenotaphs made out of sandstone and lime mortar that has terraced gardens and ritual steps around the kund. In Singapore, the local Sikh population venerate Bhai Maharaj Singh at the Bhai Maharaj Singh Memorial, which functions as a samadh.

== Examples ==
One of the popular site of pilgrimage in India is the town of Alandi in the state of Maharashtra where the 13th century Varkari saint Dnyaneshwar took Sanjivan Samadhi, or entombed himself in the state of Samadhi. His devotees believe that he is still alive.

A samadhi dedicated to Bhaduri Mahasaya (also known as Paramahansa Maharshi Nagendranath, the founder of the Sanatan Dharma Pracharini Sabha can be found at Nagendra Math on Rammohan Roy Road in Kolkata, West Bengal.

A. C. Bhaktivedanta Swami Prabhupada (d. 1977) the founder of ISKCON (known as the "Hare Krishna Movement"), is commemorated with a large Samadhi Mandir in Mayapur, West Bengal. Examples of Pothohari samadhs include the Samadhi of Baba Mohan Das and the samadhi at Gurdwara Baba Than Singh.

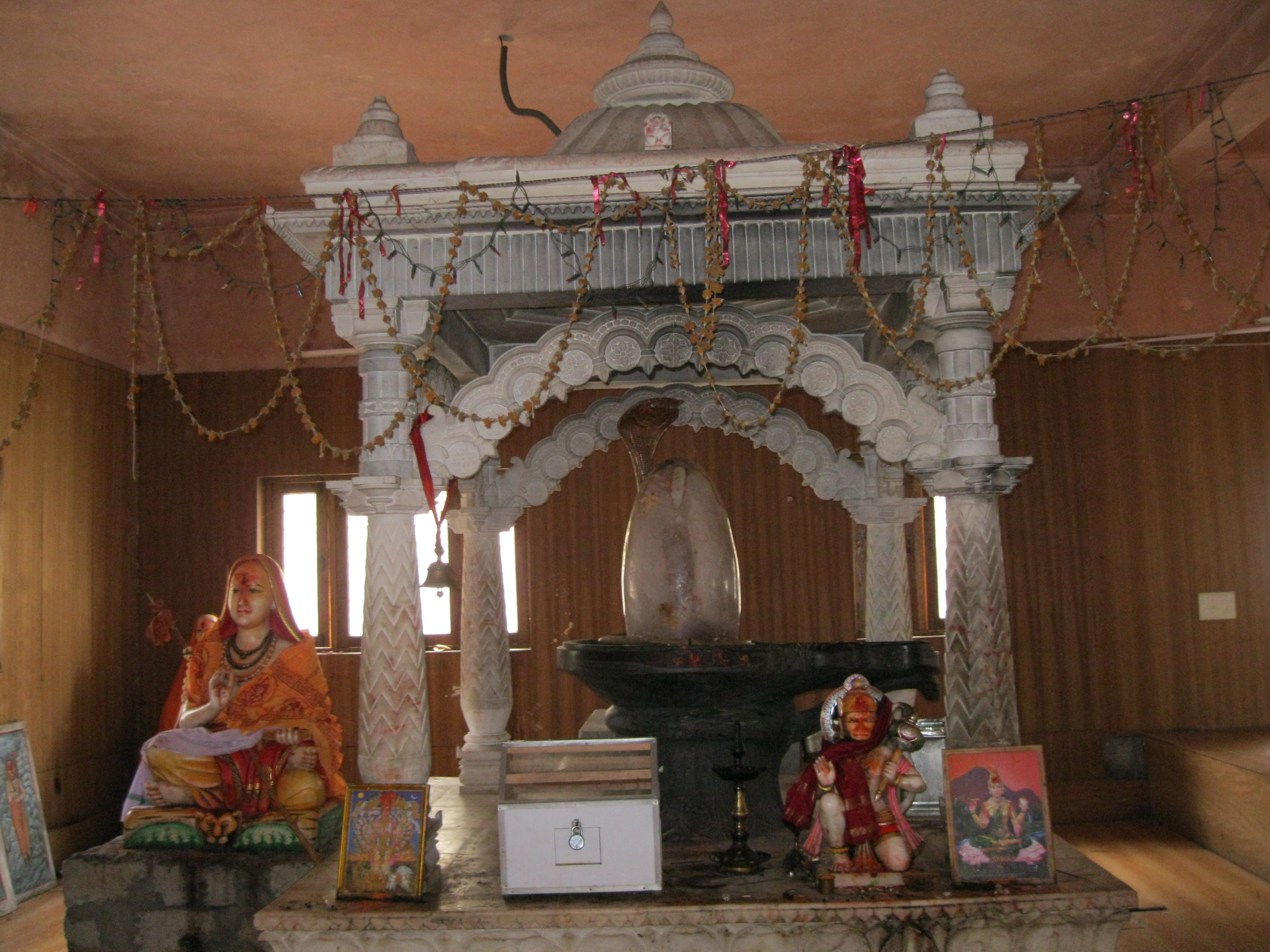
Samadhi of Sri Adi Shankaracharya

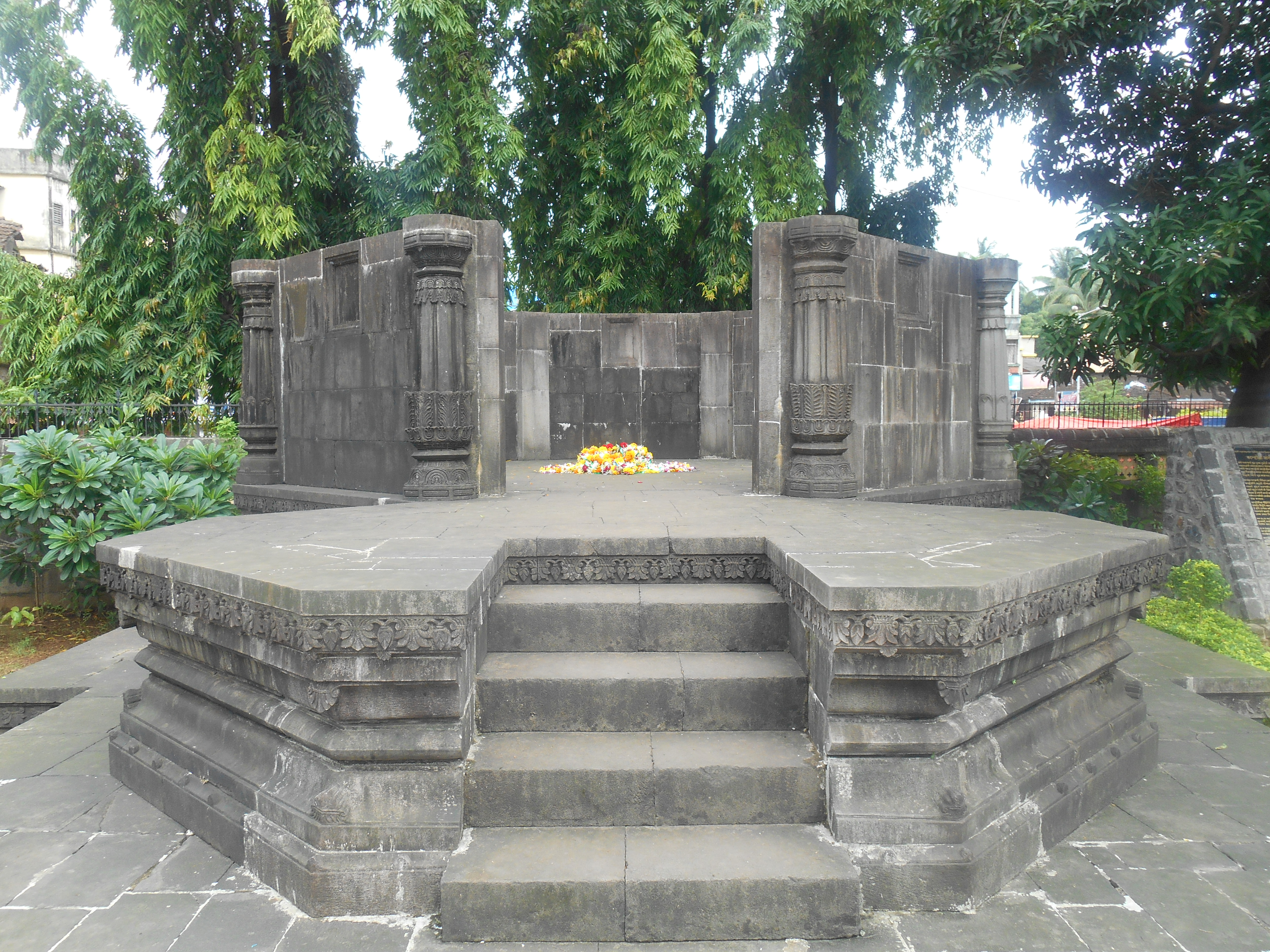
Samadhi of the Maratha admiral Kanhoji Angre

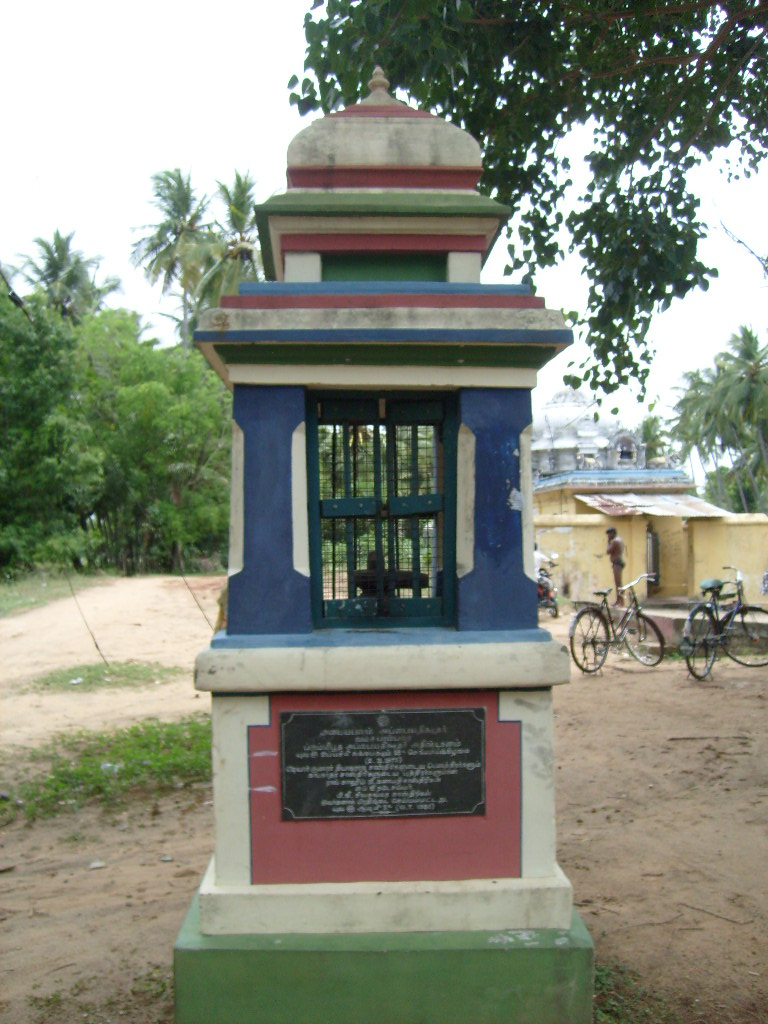
Small shrine for Appayya Dikshita, with lingam, Thiruvalangadu, Tamil Nadu

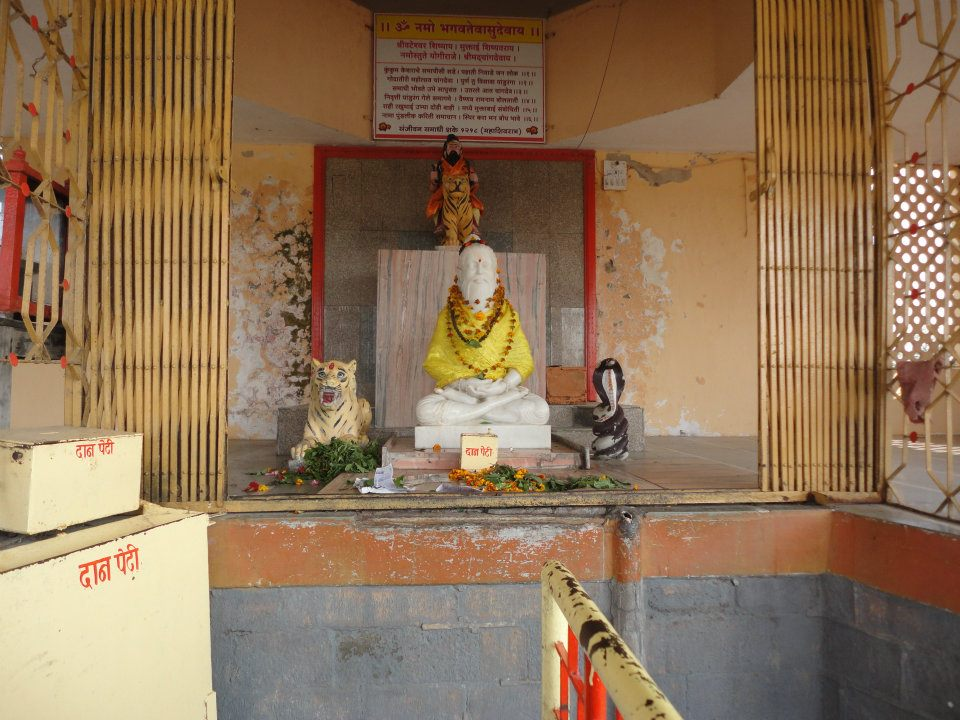
Samadhi with image, Maharashtra

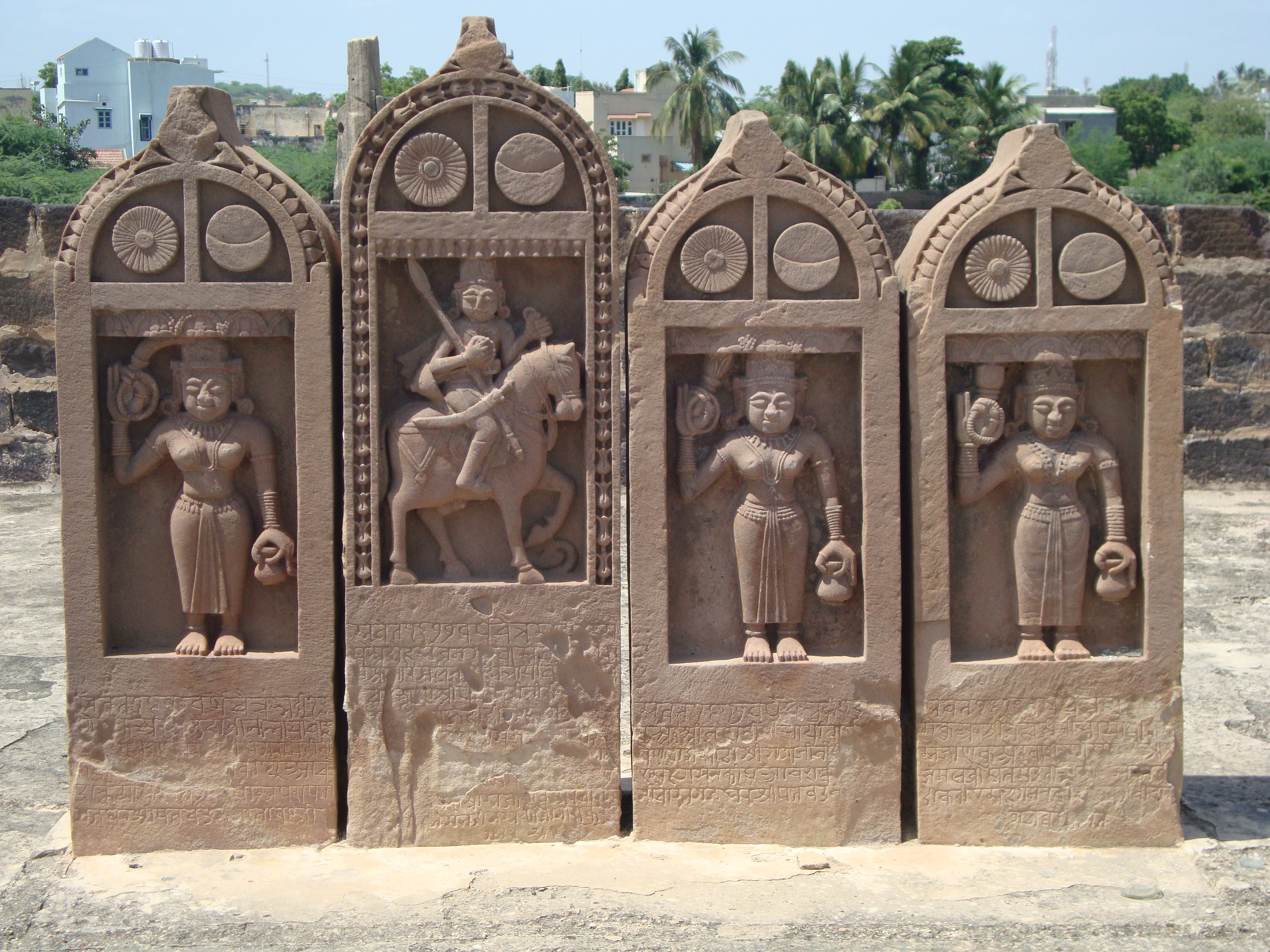
Paliya memorials, Bhuj, Gujarat

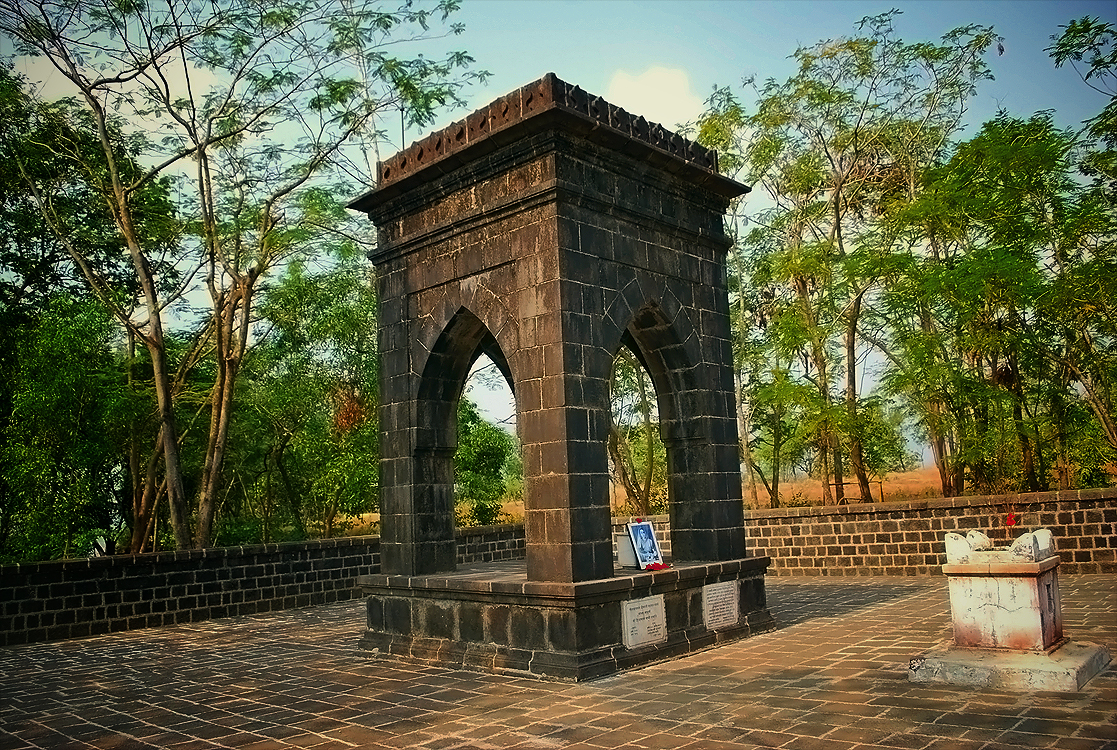
Samadhi of Jijabai, the mother of the Maratha emperor Chatrapati Shivaji Maharaj, Pachad, Raigadh, Maharashtra

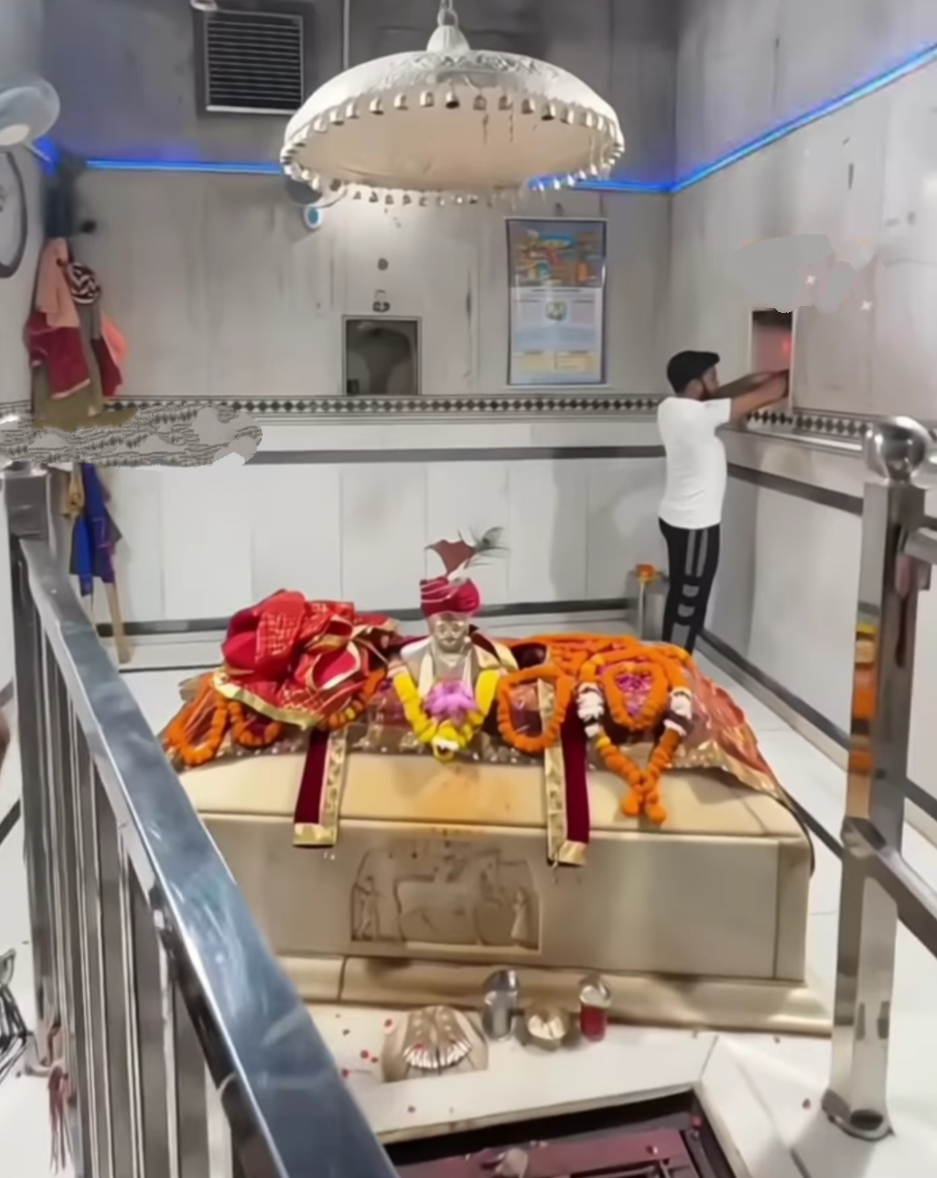
Samadhi of Gogaji, Rajasthan

== See also ==
- Stupa
- Dargah
- Chhatri
