= Gurdwara Baba Than Singh =

Sikh temple in Kot Fateh Khan, Pakistan

Religion
- Affiliation: Sikhism
- Status: Abandoned

Location
- Location: Kot Fateh Khan, Fateh Jang tehsil, Attock district, Punjab, Pakistan

Gurdwara Baba Than Singh is an abandoned, syncretic Sikh gurdwara located in western Kot Fateh Khan village in Fateh Jang tehsil, Attock district, Punjab, Pakistan. Than Singh was believed to have been a Sikh figure but he is also venerated by local Muslims, who call him Baba Thana or Sultan. The gurdwara complex contains two samadhis, one of which is decorated with frescoes depicting Sikh and Hindu themes.

== History ==
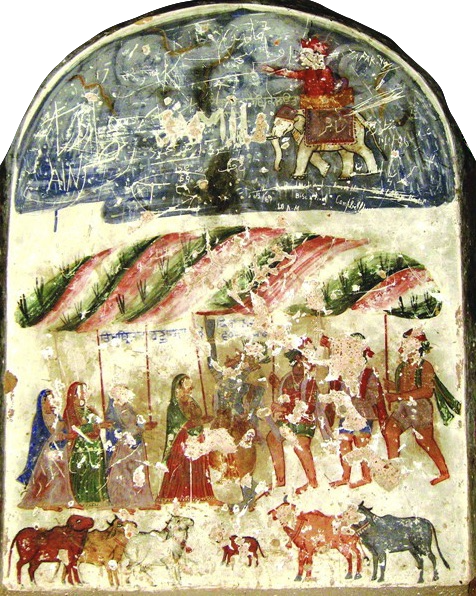
Fresco depicting Krishna upholding the Govardhan Hill to shelter his devotees, from a samadh at Gurdwara Baba Than Singh, Kot Fateh Khan, Punjab

According to Zulfiqar Ali Kalhoro, the complex dates to the British colonial-period and its samadhis are in the Pothohari-style, consisting of tanks (sarovars), step-wells (baolis), ribbed domes, and the high-neck drums. In historical times, the site was the location of a Baisakhi mela (festival) during the months April-May (Baisakh), with around 4,000 people attended the local festival in 1893. The gurdwara was relevant during the Akali movement. Sikh leader Kartar Singh Jhabbar and his Jatha of twenty-five Sikhs took possession of half of Gurdwara Kot Bhai Than Singh. In 1938, administration over the gurdwara was transferred to the Sikh committee of Hasan Abdal. The gurdwara today is in poor-condition.
