= Zulfikar family =

Egyptian noble family

Zulfikar ذو الفقار
- Noble family
- Country: Egypt
- Origin: Egyptian
- Founder: Prince Ahmed Pasha Turguman
- Titles: Pasha, Bek or Bey, Hanum, Prince, Emir
- Members: Ahmed Pasha Zulfikar
- Estates: Islamic Cairo, Old Cairo, Upper Egypt

The Zulfikar family, sometimes spelled Zolfakar (Egyptian: Ⲍⲩⲗϥⲓⲕⲁⲣ, Arabic: عائلة ذو الفقار), is a prominent Egyptian noble family. They have had an influence that has stretched from the late 16th century to modern times.

It is known that more than one Zulfikar has been either a ruler of Egypt or a prince in the Egyptian Mamluk era. The family has produced a large number of military officers from the 19th to the late-20th century. It has also contributed to modern Egyptian art through the works of filmmaker Ezz El-Dine Zulfikar, filmmaker Mahmoud Zulfikar, actor Salah Zulfikar, poet Magda Zulfikar, among others.

== History ==
Sources indicate that family's last name 'Zulfikar' came as a reference to the Zulfiqar sword of Muhammad. In legend, Muhammad asked God to give him a sword, and granted it to Ali to replace his old broken sword. This sword is of a high value to the Muslim world.

Sources indicate that the Zulfikar family was already well established in Cairo by the late 16th century. Many elders thereof held the title of prince, pasha, bey or hanim in the Mamluk era. Also sources indicate that other Zulfikars sat on the Majlis created by Ibrahim Pasha. Ahmed Pasha Zulfikar is widely considered to be the modern founding father of the family. On the occasion of the 1952 Egyptian revolution, the Zulfikar family contributed in fighting against the British occupation, with many members in the Egyptian Armed Forces and the Egyptian National Police during the period. The influence of the family on Egyptian culture, literature, academia, and art was fundamental.

== Notable members ==
Notable family members include Mohammed Bek Zulfikar and Ahmed Mourad Bey Zulfikar (who served as Senior Cairo police commissioner in early 1940s). With a majority of a military background, such as major general Kamal Zulfikar in the Egyptian Armed Forces, others switched careers to filmmaking in the mid-20th century. This cohort included such figures as Ezz El-Dine Zulficar, who was also a military officer in the Egyptian Armed Forces, a friend of many of the major Free Officers Movement members who had a career shift in 1947. He presented patriotic films after the revolution. He is regarded as one of the most influential filmmakers in Egyptian cinema.

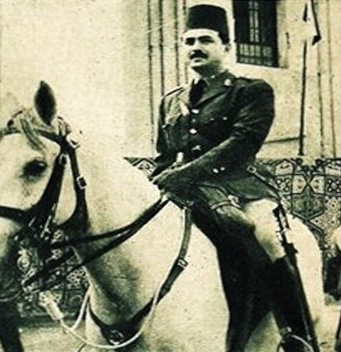
Salah Zulfikar

Salah Zulfikar was one of Egypt's heroes in its battle against the occupation while serving in the Egyptian National Police. He became an actor in 1956 and a film producer in 1958. He starred in over one hundred films. He is regarded as one of his country's most iconic male performers in the 20th century. Mahmoud Zulfikar was an architect, film director, actor, producer and screenwriter. He was a major cinematic figure in the Egyptian film industry.

In the Businessworld, notable family members include Ahmed Bek Zulfikar, Abbas Helmi Bek Zulfikar, Mohammed Zulfikar, Mamdouh Zulfikar among others - who all worked in multiple business fields during the 19th and the 20th centuries. Ahmed Zulfikar was an Egyptian entrepreneur. He was one of the founders of the modern irrigation systems technology in Egypt.

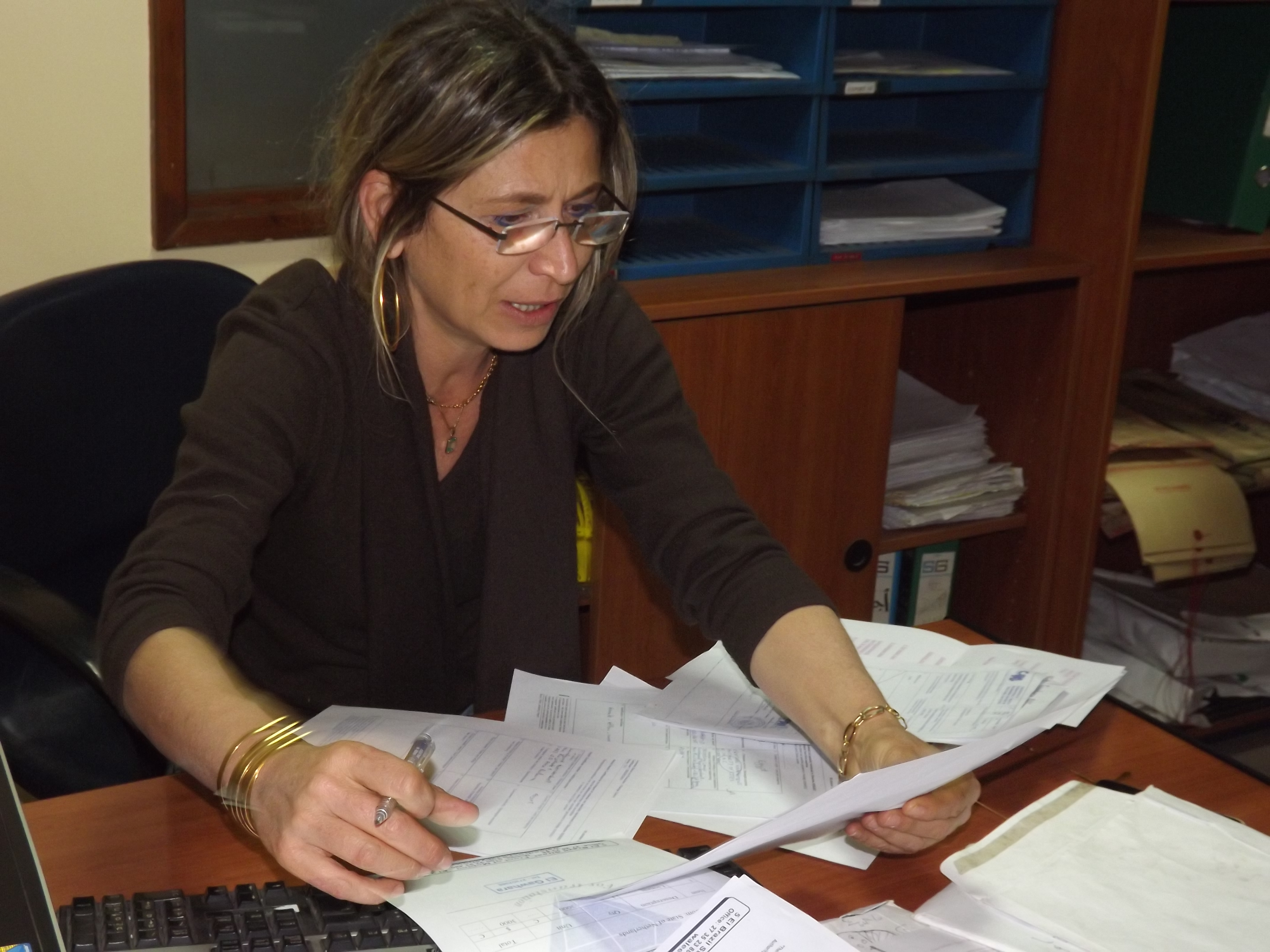
Dina Zulfikar

Other notable members of the family include Mona Zulfikar; she is a prominent lawyer and human rights activist who was included in the Forbes 2021 list of the "100 most powerful businesswomen in the Arab region". Ezz El-Dine Zulfikar's daughter, Dina Zulfikar, is an environmentalist and active member of Egypt's animal rights community, having co-founded the country's first and largest animal rights organization, the Society for Protection of Animal Rights in Egypt.

== See also ==
- Nobility
- Cairo Governorate
- Zulfiqar (disambiguation)
