= Animal welfare in Egypt =

Animal welfare in Egypt is a subject of public dialog and advocacy by various organizations.

== Working donkeys ==
Donkeys have historically been common working animals in Egypt. In modern times, working donkeys are often subjected to abuse including neglect and deliberate injury. A study has shown that the population of donkeys in Egypt has fluctuated over the span of 30 years from 1966 to 1996. In 1966 the population was 1,162; in 1976 it was 1,568; in 1986 it was 1,879 and in 1996 it was 1,690.

== Alexandria Zoo ==
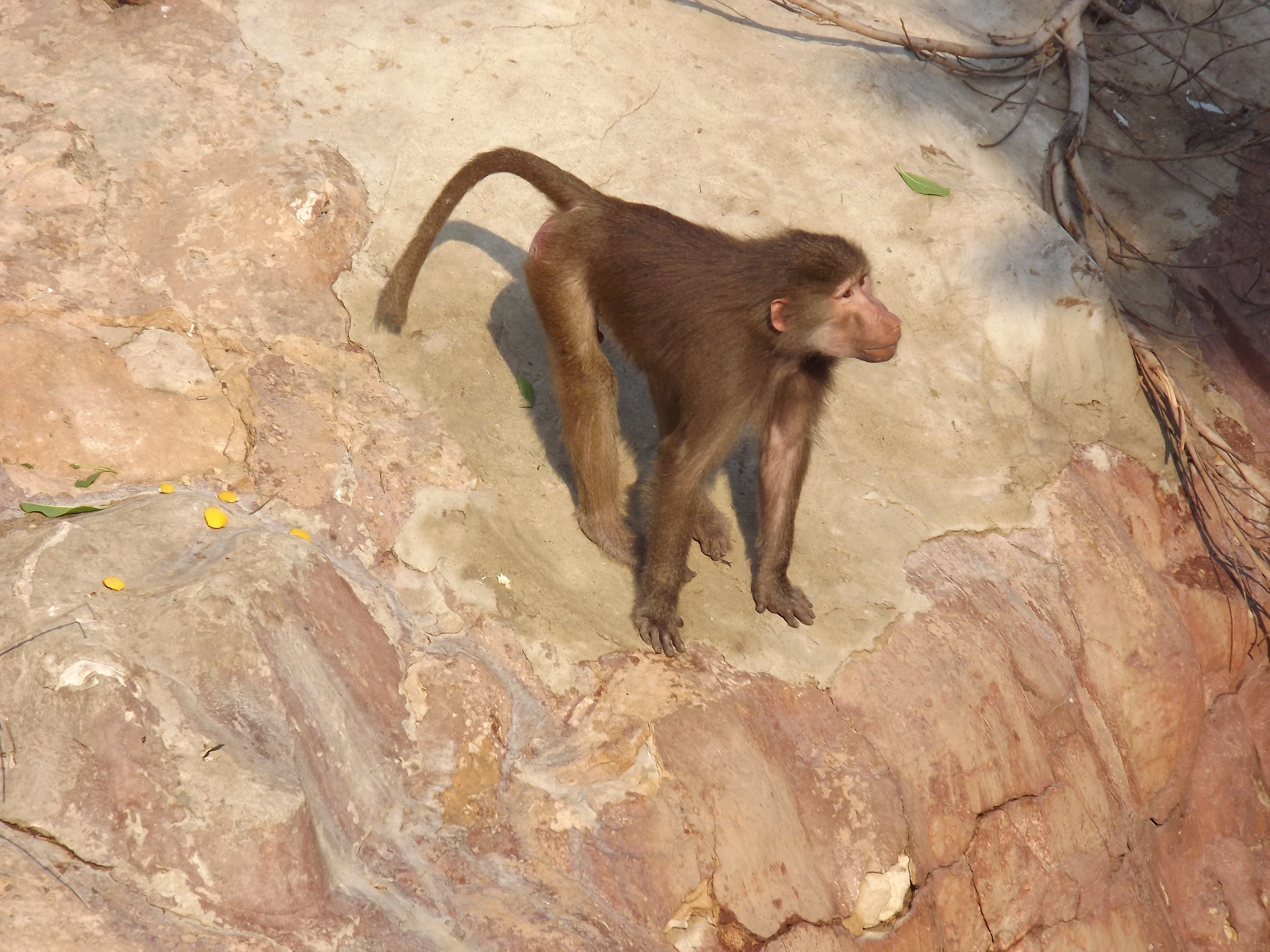
A hamadryas baboon at Alexandria Zoo.

Alexandria Zoo was the subject of attention in February 2015 when two men entered Alexandria Zoo and beat up hamadryas baboons with sticks as dozens of zoo goers watched and laughed. The two men spent a considerable amount of time in the monkey enclosure and no security at the zoo intervened. Eventually, the men left the scene un-apprehended and without suffering any consequences.

== Effects of political turmoil ==
After the January 25 revolution, tourist attractions involving animals were unable to care for their animals due to the decreased tourism. The Egyptian Society of Animal Friends (ESAF) was able to feed 700 horses, veterinary care was provided, nosebands and fly masks were distributed. In four days, 526 animals were fed and ultimately 1,857 horses and donkeys and 94 camels were tended to using the aid of the Humane Society International (HSI).

== Stray animal culling ==
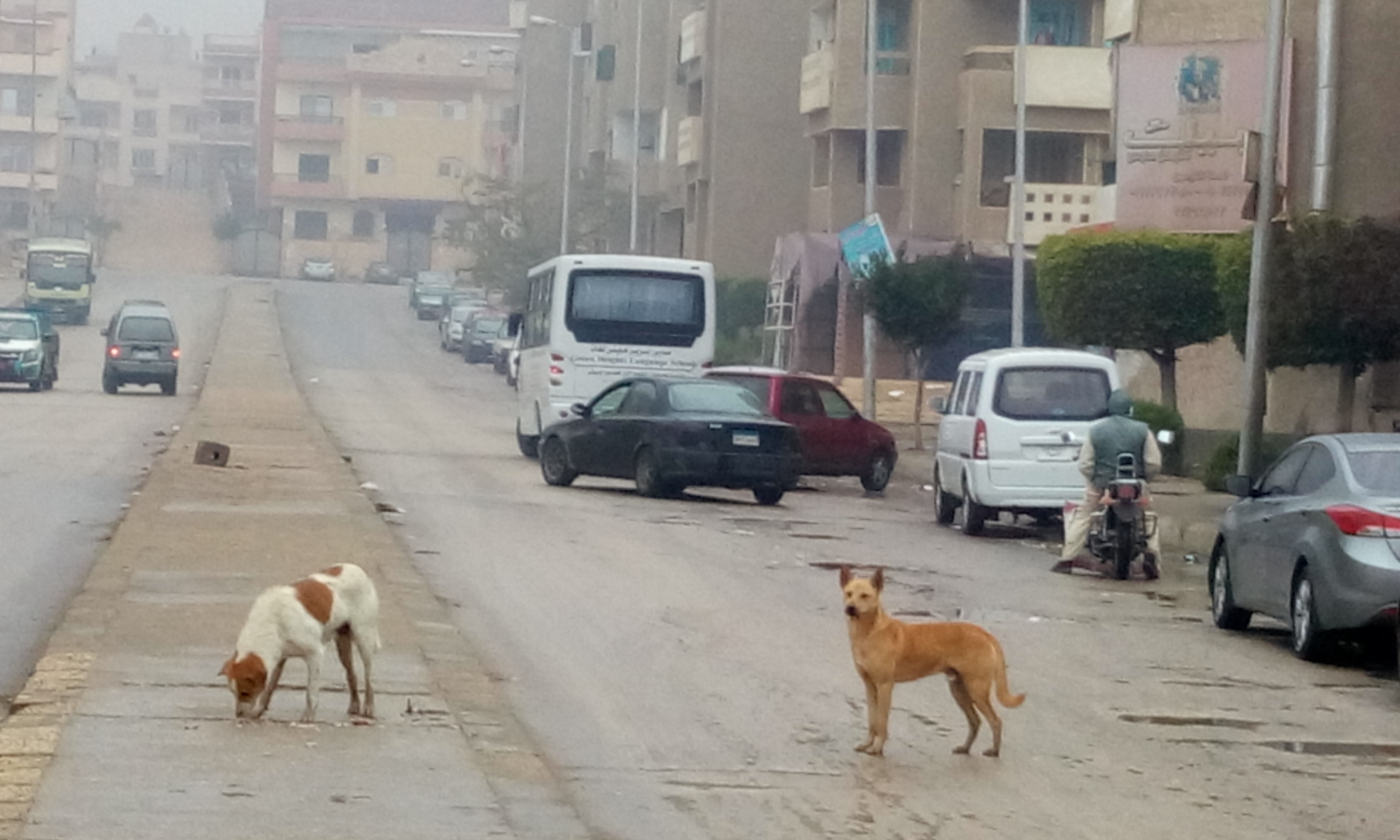
Street dogs in Cairo.

In February 2015 PETA Asia Pacific started a petition called "Urge Egypt to Stop Cruel Cull of Dogs!" where messages would be sent straight to the governor of Cairo, the governor of Giza and the Minister of Agriculture. S.P.A.R.E has encouraged people via their Facebook page in July 2014 to adopt stray "balady" dogs to save them from being culled.

Another ongoing petition was launched by Occupy For Animals on Change.org in January 2013 to stop the poisoning and shooting of street animals. In March 2015, the Veterinary Directorate of Minya and Suez ruled a mass cull of all the stray dogs. According to El Watan News, they have put down 133 dogs in Minya.

== The Ahram Street dog ==
In February 2015, a dog in Qaliubeya's governorate - Shubra El-Khayma - was slaughtered by three men after the dog bit one of them. The men were threatening to press charges against the dog's owner and came to the deal of killing the dog as an act of redeeming honor and dropping the charges in return. The story went viral after a graphic video of the slaughter on Facebook was posted, sending animal rights activists into a rage. The three men, two of whom are butchers, were arrested days after the incident. The owner, along with the three defendants was sentenced to three years in prison. A Cairo appeal court reduced the sentence.

== Fatima Naoot ==
In 2016, Egyptian poet Fatima Naoot was convicted of "contempt of religion" and sentenced to three years in jail for a 2014 Facebook post criticising animal killing during Eid.

== The Matareya dog ==
In December, 2019 a video clip went viral across social media showing four people torturing a dog in a Tuk-Tuk by striking it with large knives. The incident took place in al-Matareya suburb of Cairo, and immediately sparked outrage online. As a result, four people were arrested for torturing and killing the dog.

== Notable animal welfare organisations ==
- The Animal Care in Egypt organization (ACE) was founded by Kim Taylor and Julie Wartenberg. It is based in Luxor and provides free veterinary care and education.
- The Animal Welfare of Luxor (AWOL) is a UK registered charity on the West bank of Luxor that focusses on educating children in proper animal healthcare and treatment.
- The Donkey Sanctuary is operating from Giza in three mobile clinics.
- The Egyptian Mau Rescue Organization (EMRO) was formed in 2004 as a non-governmental organization (NGO) that is dedicated to rescuing Mau cats, the descendants of the Ancient Egyptian sacred cat.
- The Egyptian Society for Mercy to Animals (ESMA) was founded in 2007 as a non-profit organization. They work for animal welfare across Egypt. ESMA operates two no-kill shelters and adoption centers in Egypt. They currently house over 2,000 animals, including dogs, cats, and working animals like donkeys and camels.
- The Animal Protection Foundation (APF), founded in 2014 as a nonprofit organization with a mission to improve the lives of animals in the community.
- The Society for Protection of Animal Rights in Egypt (S.P.A.R.E.) was founded in 2001 by Amina Abaza and Dina Zulfikar. In November 2013, Abaza fought for the rights of animals by proposing a law to prevent animal cruelty. The legislation passed and Article 45 was introduced in the Egyptian Constitution as: "The State shall protect its seas, shores, lakes, waterways and natural protectorates. Trespassing, polluting or misusing any of them is prohibited. Every citizen is guaranteed the right of enjoying them. The State shall protect and develop the green space in the urban areas; preserve plant, animal and fish resources and protect those under the threat of extinction or danger; guarantee humane treatment of animals, all according to the law." A new legislation is being proposed after a previous one was refused that would stipulate compassion and mercy.
