= EFG Holding =

Egyptian Financial Company

EFG Holding S.A.E. إي اف چي القابضة ش.م.م
- Type: Société Anonyme Égyptienne
- Traded as: EGX: HRHO; LSE: EFGD; EGX 30 Component
- Industry: Financial Services
- Founded: 1984
- Headquarters: Cairo, Egypt
- Key people: Mona Zulficar (Chairperson); Karim Awad (CEO)
- Products: Brokerage, Asset Management, Investment Banking, Private Equity, Research, Leasing, Financial Technology, Insurance, Mortgage, Microfinance
- Revenue: ▲ E£4.8 billion (2019)
- Operating income: ▲ E£4.8 billion (2019)
- Net income: ▲ E£1.8 billion (2019)
- Total assets: ▼ E£44.76 billion (2019)
- Total equity: ▲ E£13.04 billion (2019)
- Number of employees: 4,500
- Website: www.efg-hermes.com

EFG Holding S.A.E. (Egyptian Financial Group Holding Company) is an Egyptian financial services company present in the Middle East, North Africa, Sub-Saharan Africa, and South Asia regions and specializes in securities brokerage, asset management, investment banking, private equity and research in addition to finance lease, factoring, microfinance, Financial technology, mortgage, and insurance. EFG Holding serves a range of clients including sovereign wealth funds, endowments, corporations, financial institutions, high-net-worth clients and individual customers.

EFG Hermes is listed on the Egyptian Exchange (EGX) and London (LSE) stock exchanges. EFG Hermes has offices in Egypt, the United Arab Emirates (UAE), the Kingdom of Saudi Arabia (KSA), Pakistan, Oman, Kuwait, Jordan, Kenya, Nigeria, UK, United States and Bangladesh with over 4,500 people from 25 nationalities. They serve clients from the Middle East, North Africa, Europe and the United States. Currently, EFG Holding is listed as number 13 in Forbes' Top 50 Listed Companies in Egypt 2023.

== History ==
EFG, also known as the Egyptian Financial Group, became the first investment banking firm in Egypt when it was established by Dr Mohamed Taymour in 1984. Holding was founded in 1993 under the newly promulgated Capital Markets Law 95. EFG created and analyzed privatization plans for the Egyptian government for several years. In 1993, The Egyptian Financial Group and Hermes independently made a move into securities brokerage. The two companies competed and both companies brought many investment strategies that were common to the west to Egypt as several of the two firm's founders had Wall Street experience in corporate finance, sales & trading and asset management;, for example Hermes established the first equity index in all of Egypt.

In 1994, both Egyptian Financial Group and Holding entered into asset management. Fueled by organic growth; the two firms also accounted for lead managing a majority of the privatization capital markets IPO's during 1995 and 1996. The two companies soon reached the point that further growth was not possible without a wider network of local and international clients on one hand, as well as the rising competitive threat of international investment banks in the progressively more active Egyptian market in terms of investment banking privatization transactions as well as higher trading volumes . These factors led to a merger in 1996 between EFG and Hermes.

== Financial performance ==
For the year 2021, EFG Holding has posted profit after tax (PAT) of E£1.5 billion along with group’s top line surpassing the E£6 billion.

== Structure ==
EFG Holding has five divisions and six subsidiaries under its finance platform

=== Securities Brokerage ===
EFG Holding Securities Brokerage is the leading brokerage house in the Arab world and caters to investors including foreign, local and Gulf institutions as well as individual, VIP, high-net-worth individuals and family offices. The division's products and services range from trading services including phone trading, online trading, SWAP/P-Note products trading and margin lending for Egyptian retail investors.

=== Asset Management ===
EFG Holding Asset Management serves a client base that includes sovereign wealth funds, endowments, foundations, multinational corporations and family offices. The division employs professionals in portfolio management, trading, research, compliance and risk across its 3 locations in Egypt, UAE (Dubai) and Saudi Arabia.

=== Private Equity ===
EFG Holding Private Equity is a private equity house, with a presence in Cairo and Dubai. The division is focused on attractive investment opportunities that capitalise on different opportunities in and outside the MENA region. EFG Hermes Private Equity advised InfraMed, the largest investment vehicle dedicated to infrastructure investments in the Southern and Eastern Mediterranean. The firm was also one of five global and regional founding sponsors that together contributed EUR 385 million to establish InfraMed. In late 2014, EFG Holding launched Vortex - its renewable energy vehicle - to invest in solar and wind energy projects across Europe and Asia.

=== Investment Banking ===
EFG Hermes Investment Banking is an advisor for major M&A, debt and equity transactions. The division's investment professionals have advised on cross-border transactions in the region through a distribution network that encompasses more than 100 investors across North America, Europe, the Middle East and Africa. The Investment Banking team has completed some US$53.3 billion in M&A transactions since 1985 while raising more than US$19 million through initial public offerings, rights issues, secondary offerings and private placements in the same period.

=== Research ===
EFG Holding Research division offers its clients coverage of MENA markets, including more than 150 companies representing c. 60% of the region's aggregate market capitalisation. The team offers economics and strategy coverage of 11 key countries in the Arab world. Products include equity research, strategy and macro-strategy notes, sector overviews, economic notes, industrial research and country-specific economic and banking data reports.

== Strategy ==
EFG Holding global strategy relies heavily on expanding in frontier emerging markets FEM. Therefore, the company has made its priority to enter into the major financial hubs of the Middle-East, namely Egypt, the United Arab Emirates, Saudi Arabia, Qatar, Oman, Kuwait and Lebanon. Further expansions focused on key African financial hubs such as Kenya as a hub for East Africa and Nigeria as a hub for West Africa.

=== United Arab Emirates ===
EFG Hermes launched its brokerage activities in the UAE in early 2005, and by early 2007 had captured dominant market share on Dubai Financial Market. The firm is also the top ranked broker on the Abu Dhabi Securities Market, Dubai Financial Market and Nasdaq Dubai.

In December 2005, EFG Holding was granted a license by the Dubai International Financial Centre to conduct asset management and investment banking activities. EFG Hermes UAE is regulated in this capacity by the Dubai Financial Services Authority, an independent regulatory authority that operates to the standards of major financial centers such as London and New York City. Out of Dubai, the firm manages the region's top performing funds and has closed a number of landmark investment banking transactions. In February 2006, EFG Hermes UAE was also granted a license to conduct brokerage activities from within the Dubai International Financial Centre and became the first regional trading, clearing and custody member of the Dubai International Financial Exchange, its wholesale exchange.

=== Kingdom of Saudi Arabia ===
EFG Holding was granted a license from the Capital Market Authority (Saudi Arabia) to launch its operations in the Kingdom of Saudi Arabia in March 2007 offering securities brokerage, investment banking, asset management and research services in the largest investment market in the region. The brokerage arm reached the #1 position among the 12 independent brokerage companies, despite having started trading properly only in the third quarter of 2007.

=== Pakistan ===
EFG Hermes, inaugurated its office in Pakistan, making it the first foreign investment bank to directly enter the market since 2008 and the first foreign broker to have a local footprint in the country. The opening followed the firm's acquisition of Pakistani brokerage Invest and Finance Securities Ltd., which began operating as EFG Hermes Pakistan Limited.

=== Oman ===
In April 2008, EFG Hermes acquired 51% of Vision Securities in Oman at a PE ratio of 11.5 compared to EFG Hermes’ PE ratio of 16.6. EFG Hermes has long since accounted for substantial flows into the Omani market on behalf of its foreign institutional clients, and is able to serve a broader base of clients from its presence on the ground in Oman.

=== Kuwait ===
EFG Hermes IFA, the brokerage arm of EFG Hermes in Kuwait, is a brokerage firm on the Kuwait Stock Exchange (KSE) with a client base including a wide array of retail, VIP and high-net-worth clients, as well as local, regional, and international institutional investors. EFG Hermes IFA provides the full range of brokerage services including an online trading platform.

The firm has maintained its position as the top brokerage firm in Kuwait.

=== Jordan ===
Since inception, EFG Hermes Jordan has maintained a client base of around 6,000 investors by the end of 1H2017. Currently, the research team covers five of the largest listed companies that represent a market capitalization of 45%.

=== Kenya ===
EFG Hermes Kenya launched its operations in 2017, being the firm’s first foray into Sub-Saharan Africa in a step that will serve as an East African hub into more neighboring markets. The company provides securities brokerage, research and corporate advisory services spanning Kenya and neighboring markets.

=== Nigeria ===
In 2018, EFG Hermes expanded its global presence into the largest economy in West Africa through the acquisition of Primera Africa Securities Limited, now EFG Hermes Nigeria Limited. EFG Hermes Nigeria is licensed by the Securities and Exchange Commission and the Nigerian Stock Exchange to carry out brokerage and research coverage services.

=== United States ===
EFG Hermes USA, Inc. is a subsidiary of EFG Holding and is a member of FINRA and SIPC. The office was established to serve Western institutional clients residing in North America and provides coverage of 75 frontier emerging markets (FEM) or 100% of FTSE's FEM index to its clients.

=== Bangladesh ===
EFG Hermes Bangladesh was inaugurated as rep office in Dhaka, the capital city of Bangladesh, to serve the firm’s network of global institutional clients. The addition of Bangladesh to the firm’s frontier platform came as part of EFG Hermes’ drive to expand representation in high-potential frontier emerging markets.

=== Vietnam ===
EFG Hermes entered an agreement in 2019 with ACBS - the securities brokerage arm of ACB Asia Commercial Bank of Vietnam to offer its clients on-ground access to the local capital markets.

== See also ==
- Suez Canal Bank
- Paysky
