= Slogans in Shia Islam =

In Shia Islam, short slogans (Persian: شعار) are a common way to express religious or political ideas especially when chanted as a group or crowd. These slogans are often repeated in political parades and Latmiya (A group mourning commemoration in the month of Muharram).

== List of common Shia slogans ==
Phrase (English)	Phrase (Language and Transliteration)	Explanation and origin
There is no hero except Ali; there is no sword except Zulfiqar (some versions replace hero with man)	(Arabic: لَا فَتَىٰ إِلَّا عَلِيٌّ وَلَا سَيْفَ إِلَّا ذُو ٱلْفَقَارِ) (Transliteration: Lā fatā ʾillā ʿAlīy, wa lā sayf ʾillā Ḏū l-Fiqār)	This slogan is very famous among Shia; reported to have originated from Muhammad and is widely engraved on weapons, such as swords. The slogan is frequently preceded by a Shia invocation to Ali and is also “central to the du’a (prayer) of Isma’ilis and Twelvers alike, who recite it in one breath together with their declaration of faith in God.”
Every place is Karbala; every day is Ashura	(Persian: كل يوم عاشوراء وكل ارض كربلاء) (Transliteration: Kull yawm ʻĀshūrāʼ wa-kull arḍ Karbalāʼ)	This slogan is often repeated by some Shia in reference to the martyrdom of Husayn ibn Ali. The saying is intended to expand sacrifice of Husayn Ibn Ali at Karbala on the day of Ashura to a more broad sense.
Far is it from us to accept humilation	(Arabic: هَیْهَاتَ مِنَّا الذِّلَّة)	A phrase attributed to Husayn ibn Ali which. It has picked up popularity among Iranian Shia during Latmiya as per the 2026 Iran war and past conflicts in Lebanon.
Ya Ali Madad (Literally, "Oh Ali Help")	(Arabic: یا علی مدد )	Persian for "Oh Ali help". Used as a greeting among Ismaili Muslims and a popular phrase for many Shia.
Ali Wali Allah	(Arabic: عَلِيٌّ وَلِيُّ الله) (Transliteration: Aliyun Waliullah)	Arabic phrase meaning "Ali is the vicegerent of Allah" or "Ali is the guardian of Allah". Sometimes added onto the Shahada.
Live like Ali, die like Hussein	Modern Origin	The saying reveres the bravery of Ali Ibn Abi Talib and the sacrifice of Husayn Ibn Ali.
