= Society for Protection of Animal Rights in Egypt =

Egyptian animal welfare organization

Society for the Protection of Animal Rights in Egypt
- Founded: 2001
- Founder: Amina Tharwat Abaza; Dina Zulfikar
- Type: Nonprofit organization
- Purpose: Animal welfare
- Location: Cairo, Egypt
- Website: sparelives.org

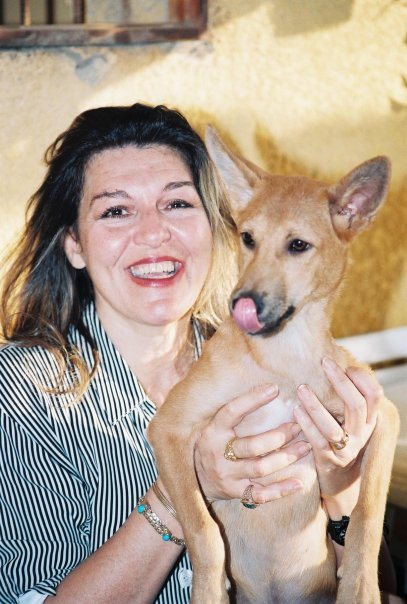
Amina Tharwat Abaza holding a street dog

Society for the Protection of Animal Rights in Egypt, or S.P.A.R.E., is a non-profit animal welfare organization in Egypt. It was founded by Amina Abaza and Dina Zulfikar in 2001. It is the first animal welfare organization in Egypt to address the situation of all animals, including dogs, cats, and donkeys.

== Aims ==
S.P.A.R.E.'s goal and challenge is to eliminate the cruel mentality which allows people to abuse animals. By raising public awareness about animal welfare in Egypt, SPARE works continuously to convince Egyptians that compassion towards animals is not a luxury, it's a must.

In addition to providing kennels, clinics, and spay and neuter operations, SPARE acts as an animal advocacy organization. It has undertaken causes such as improving conditions at the Cairo zoo, fighting the growth of "private zoos" in Egypt, and improving government standards relating to Egyptian slaughterhouses.

== See also ==
- Animal welfare in Egypt
- World Animal Protection
- Animal protection
- Animal welfare
- Animal rights
