= Zulfiqar Ali Bhatti =

Zulfiqar Ali Bhatti may refer to:

== People ==
- Zulfiqar Ali Bhatti (politician) (born 1963), Pakistani politician
- Zulfiqar Ali Bhatti (politician, born 1972) (born 1972), Pakistani politician
- Zulfiqar Ali Bhatti (writer) (born 1971), Pakistani writer and poet
