= Zulfikar Ali Khan (disambiguation) =

Zulfikar Ali Khan may refer to:

== People ==
- Zulfikar Ali Khan of Kamadhia (1859–1921), Indian nobleman
- Zulfikar Ali Khan of Rampur (1934–1992), Indian nawab and politician
