= Zulfiqar Ahmed =

Zulfiqar Ahmed may refer to:

== People ==
- Zulfiqar Ahmed (Dutch cricketer) (born 1966), Dutch cricketer
- Zulfiqar Ahmed (Pakistani cricketer) (1926–2008), Pakistani Test cricketer
