= PNS Zulfiqar =

At least three ships of the Pakistan Navy have been named PNS Zulfiqar (sometimes romanised as Zulfiquar). They are named after Zulfiqar, the legendary sword of Ali, the fourth Muslim Caliph.

- PNS Zulfiqar (K265), ex HMS Deveron, ex HMIS Dhanush, a River-class frigate
- PNS Zulfiqar (F262), ex HMS Apollo (F70), a batch 3B broadbeam Leander-class frigate
- PNS Zulfiquar (251), a F-22P Zulfiquar-class frigate
