= Ahmed Zulfikar =

Egyptian entrepreneur (1952–2010)

- أحمد ذو الفقار
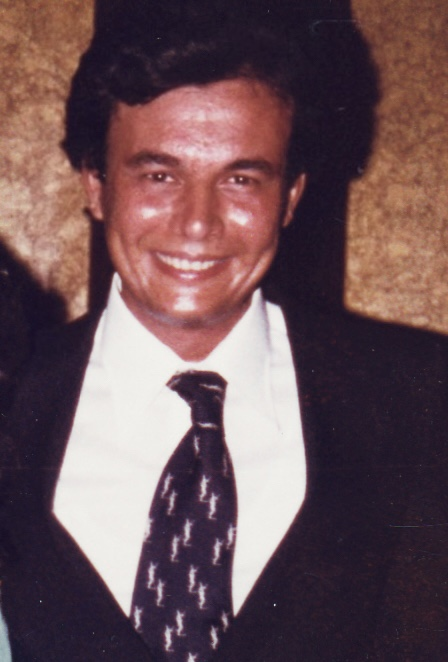
- Zulfikar in 1978
- Born: Ahmed Mourad Salah El-Din Zulfikar; 15 August 1952; Cairo, Egypt
- Died: 1 May 2010 (aged 57); Cairo, Egypt
- Education: Mechanical engineering
- Alma mater: Ain Shams University
- Occupations: Engineer; entrepreneur; businessman
- Years active: 1976–2010
- Spouse: Inas El Imam (m. 1978)
- Children: 2
- Father: Salah Zulfikar
- Family: Zulfikar family

Ahmed Mourad Salah El-Din Zulfikar (Arabic: أحمد ذو الفقار, Egyptian Arabic pronunciation: [æħmæd zol fɑqˈqɑːr]; 15 August 1952 – 1 May 2010), was an Egyptian mechanical engineer and entrepreneur. He worked for three decades in the field of infrastructure. Zulfikar was one of the first founders of the modern irrigation systems technology in Egypt.

== Early life and education ==
Ahmed Mourad Salah El-Din Zulfikar was born on 15 August 1952, in Abbassia neighborhood of Cairo to a well-off family. His father was the actor and producer Salah Zulfikar, a police officer at the time, and his mother was Mrs. Nafisa Bahgat. He has one sister, Mona, a lawyer.

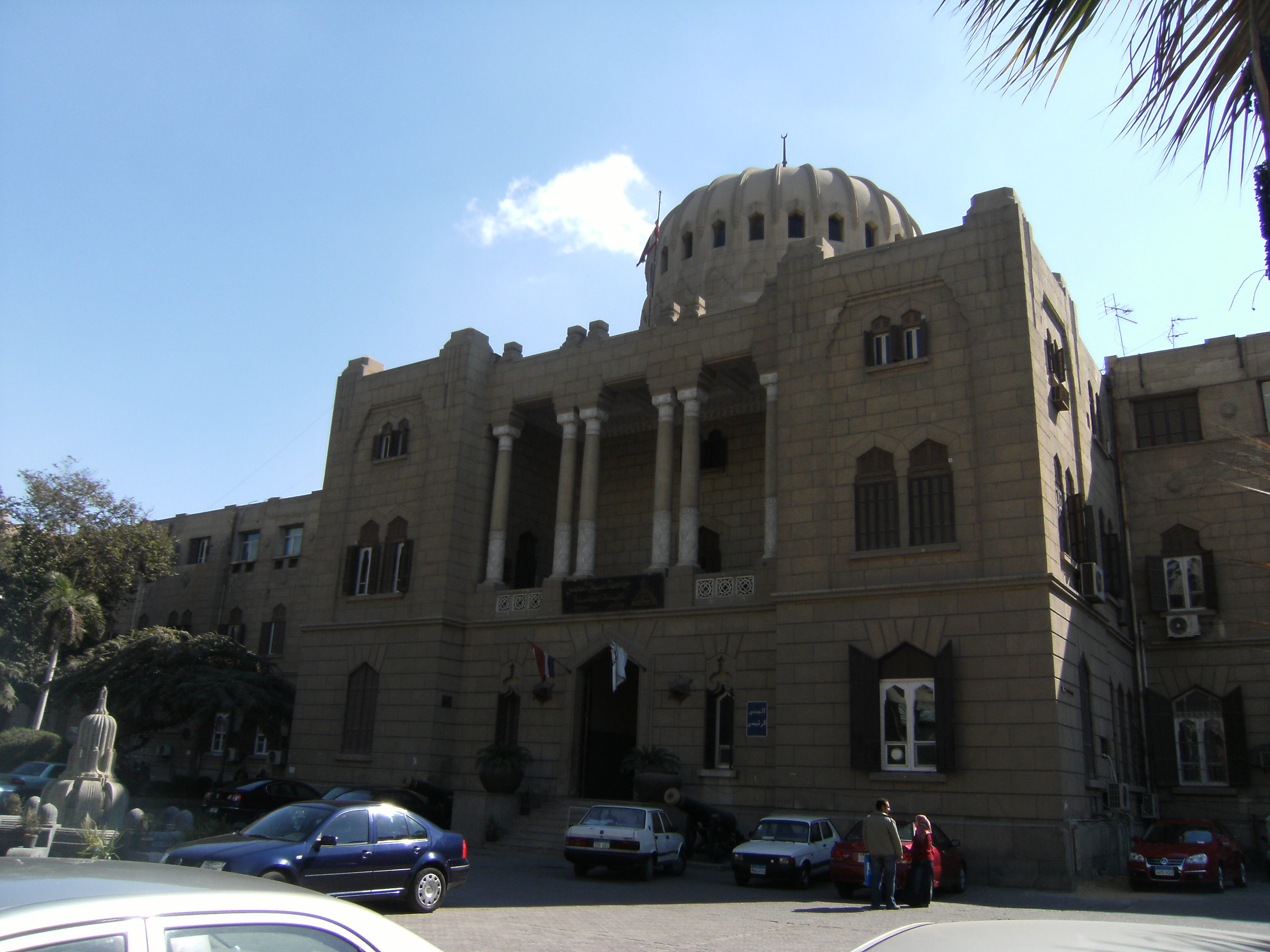
Faculty of Engineering, Ain Shams University

Despite growing up in the midst of an artistic family, his father, Salah Zulfikar, a famous actor, and his uncles, Ezz El Dine Zulfikar and Mahmoud Zulfikar, were famous directors and producers in Egyptian cinema at the time, Zulfikar was not enthusiastic about working in the movie business and chose another path away from fame and became what he always wished for, to be an engineer. He received his BA in Mechanical Engineering from Ain Shams University in 1976.

== Career ==
Zulfikar helped introduce modern irrigation technology in Egypt. He began his career in Arab Contractors. He worked as a site engineer for 3 years.

In 1979, he resigned from working for Arab Contractors and traveled to Germany for studying modern irrigation technology and returned to Egypt after a year to establish his first private corporation TOCEG Misr at the age of 27 years.

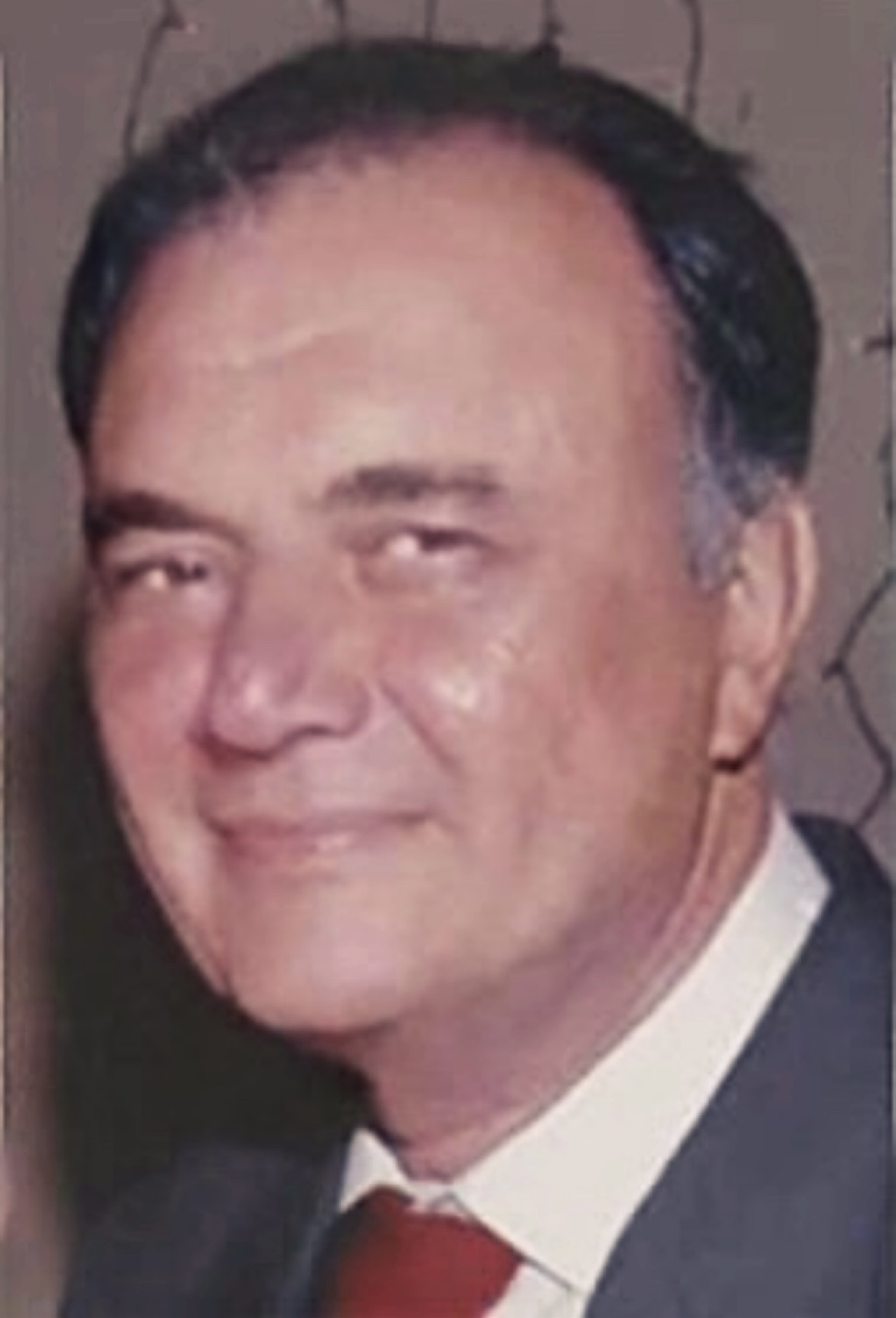
Ahmed Zulfikar in 2009

He worked for over three decades in the design and construction of modern irrigation systems and had a major role in converting tens of thousands of acres from flood irrigation to modern irrigation in the period from 1979 to 2010. He participated in the establishment of golf courses with automated irrigation systems according to international standards. He was involved with landscaping projects in hotels and resorts all over Egypt.

=== Positions held ===
- Founder and Chairman of the Board of Directors of TOCEG Misr (1979-1994).
- Member of the Board of Directors of the Egyptian Center for Agricultural Services (1992-2002).
- Consultant for Inter Group and plenty of agricultural institutions in Egypt (1998-2010).
- Founder and Chairman of the Board of Directors of the Egyptian Company for Contracting and Modern Irrigation ECMI (2000-2010).

== Personal life and death ==
Zulfikar married Mrs. Inas El Imam in Cairo in 1978 and the couple remained married until his death in 2010. Together they had two sons, Salah and Karim. The elder; Salah Zulfikar is a corporate regional director and the younger; Karim Zulfikar is a businessman owning his own corporation.

Zulfikar died of a sudden heart attack at the age of 57 on 1 May 2010 in Cairo, Egypt.

== See also ==
- Economy of Egypt
- List of Egyptians
