= Dina Zulfikar =

Egyptian environmentalist

- دينا ذو الفقار
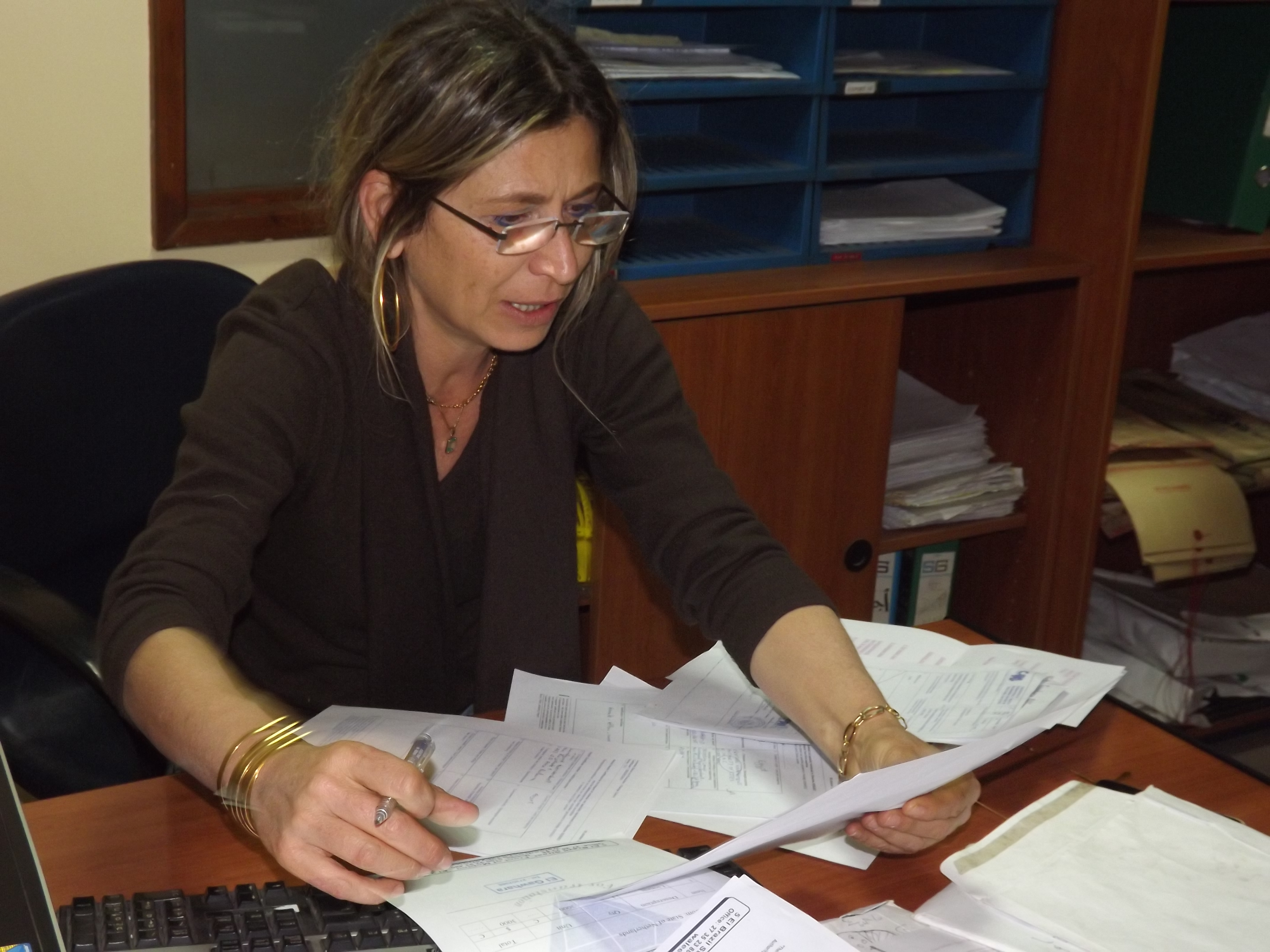
- Zulfikar in 2013
- Born: Dina Ezz El-Dine Zulfikar; April 22, 1962 (age 64); Zamalek, Cairo, Egypt
- Occupation: Film distributor • environmentalist • activist
- Organization: Society for Protection of Animal Rights in Egypt (founder)
- Father: Ezz El-Dine Zulfikar
- Family: Zulfikar family

Dina Ezz El-Dine Zulfikar (Arabic: دينا ذو الفقار, ‘Dīna Zū al-Fiqār, ‘Dina Zulficar, ‘Dina Zulfakar; born April 22, 1962) is an Egyptian environmentalist, film distributor and animal, wildlife rights activist. She is a member of the Animal welfare and rights in the Netherlands.

== Early life and education ==
Zulfikar was born on April 22, 1962, in the Zamalek district of Cairo, to the filmmaker and former military officer Ezz El-Dine Zulfikar, and the actress Kawthar Shafik. She had a great sympathy towards animals in her childhood. Her activism began while she was a student at Cairo University. Zulfikar teamed up with her childhood friend Amina Abaza and together they established SPARE Animal Welfare Society.

== Career ==
Zulfikar graduated from Cairo University in 1983, majoring in Business Administration. She worked in the US Military Cooperation Office in Egypt, and established the Arab Celebrity website. She also owned a film distribution company in Egypt and France, and then devoted herself entirely to animal rights.

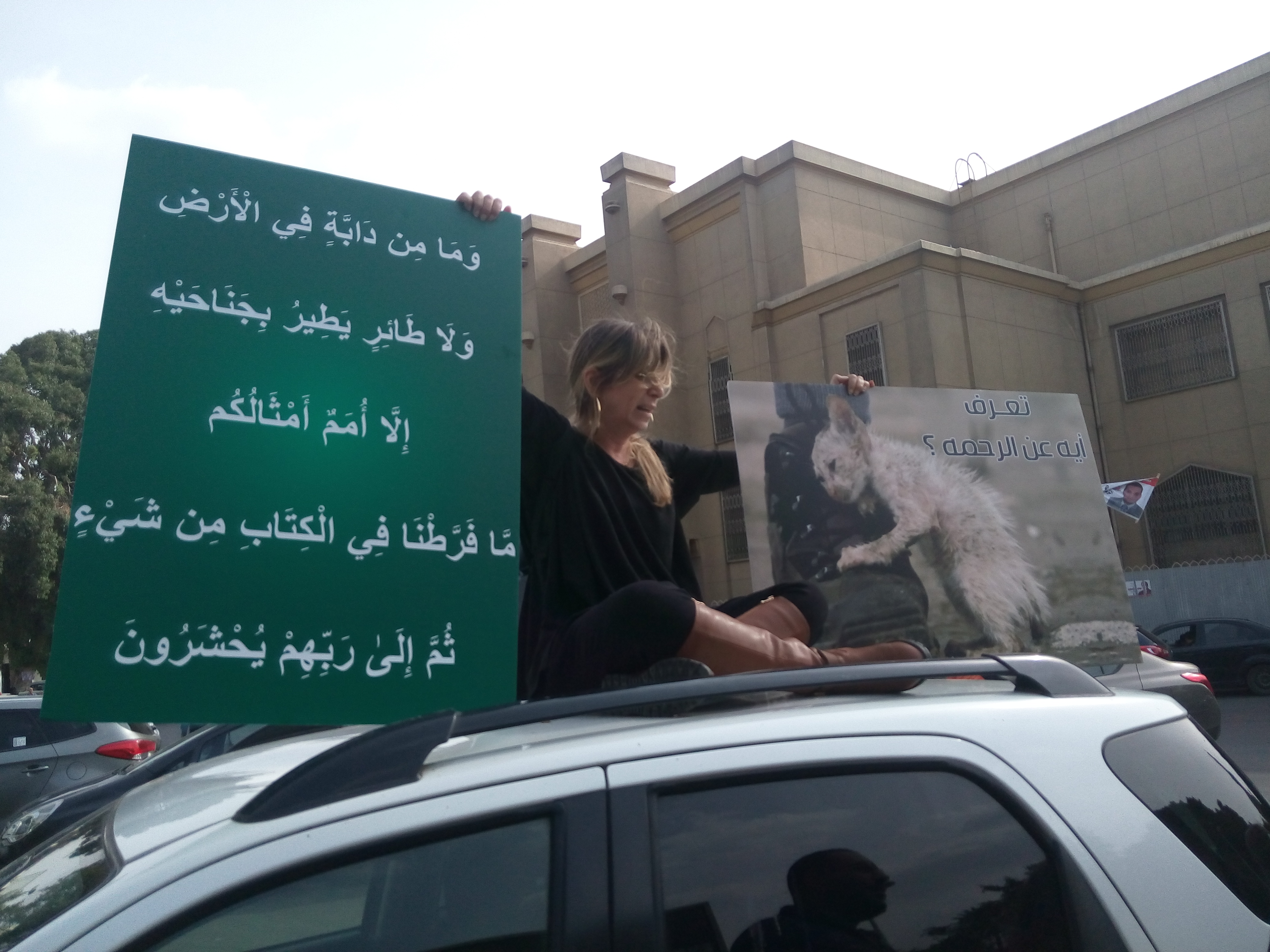
Zulfikar protesting in Cairo against killing cats, 2013.

Recently, Zulfikar called for the inclusion of animal welfare and wildlife preservation articles in the Egyptian constitution. She also called for improving the living conditions of animals in zoos and for the application of international standards. She became one of Egypt's most determined and dedicated animal welfare advocates.

== See also ==
- Animal Welfare in Egypt
- List of animal rights advocates
