= Paysky =

- Company type: Private
- Industry: Digital Payments, Fintech
- Founded: April 2017
- Founder: Waleed Sadek
- Headquarters: Cairo, Egypt
- Area served: Egypt, UAE, Saudi Arabia, Pakistan, Libya, Sudan, Uganda, Botswana, Ghana, Ivory Coast, Senegal, Mali, Benin, Togo, Cameroon
- Services: Digital payment solutions, payment gateways, financial services, mobile apps
- Number of employees: 200+
- Website: www.Paysky.com

Paysky is an Egyptian fintech company that provides digital payment technologies for banks, businesses, governments, and individuals across the Middle East, Africa, and Asia.

== History ==
Paysky was established by Waleed Sadek in Cairo, Egypt, in 2017. In 2019, Paysky launched the National Payment Gateway in collaboration with the Central Bank of Egypt, enabling e-commerce transactions, QR code payments, and POS acceptance. The company also partnered with Visa and MasterCard to introduce new digital payment technology in Egypt.

In 2020, Paysky expanded regionally by launching the Libyan National Payment Gateway with Moamalat, the Central Bank of Libya.

In 2021, it launched the National Payment Gateway in Libya, allowing local banks and businesses to accept payments through online platforms and POS systems.

In 2022, the company introduced the Yalla Super App, the first fully-fledged digital financial services platform in the Middle East and Africa, in partnership with Visa. The app offers a range of services, including money transfers, online payments, transportation bookings, and daily needs ordering.

In 2023, Yalla Super App achieved over 3 million downloads in Egypt and processing more than 13 million transactions totaling 12 billion EGP in transactions during its first year. Paysky also partnered with MTN to develop a digital commerce platform, reaching 2 million merchants across 16 African markets. The platform integrated MTN’s internal systems, local delivery services, and global digital payment solutions, generating over $1 billion in additional revenue within the first year.

In February 2023, Yalla Super App partnered with Dahab Masr to introduce "Yalla Invest," enabling users to invest in gold starting from 0.25 grams through the app. In August, GIM-UEMOA partnered with Paysky to develop GIMpay across eight West African countries.

In 2024, Paysky developed a regional payment gateway for GIM UEMOA, covering eight West African nations. The company was also featured in Forbes Middle East’s Fintech 50 in 2024 and 2025.

In February 2025, Paysky partnered with MTN Group Fintech to launch "Market by MoMo," an e-commerce platform in Uganda. In March 2025, it partnered with MTN Group and FinCommerce to enhance e-commerce in Africa by improving mobile payment technologies.
