= Ahmed Mourad Bey Zulfikar =

Egyptian police officer

- أحمد مراد بك ذو الفقار
- Born: Ahmed Mourad Mohamed Zulfikar; 18 August 1888; Cairo, Khedivate of Egypt
- Died: 3 April 1945 (aged 56); Cairo, Kingdom of Egypt
- Resting place: Cairo, Egypt
- Education: Egyptian Police Academy
- Occupation: Police officer
- Family: Zulfikar family
- Police career
- Allegiance: Egypt
- Branch: Egyptian National Police
- Service years: 1908–1945
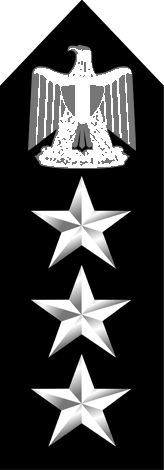
- Rank: Brigadier general

Ahmed Mourad Bey Zulfikar or Ahmed Mourad Zulfikar (Arabic: أحمد مراد بك ذو الفقار; August 18, 1888 – April 3, 1945), was an Egyptian police commissioner in the ministry of Interior of Egypt.

== Biography ==
Zulfikar was born in Cairo on 18 August 1888 to Mohamed bek Zulfikar, a doctor. He graduated from Police Academy.

Zulfikar worked in the Egyptian Police Force. He held the position of Cairo Head of Security in the 1930s and 1940s. He is a member of the Zulfikar family. He was married and has nine children, Mohamed, Soad, Fekreya, Sophia, Mahmoud, Ezz El-Dine, Kamal, Salah and Mamdouh.

Zulfikar died of a heart attack on April 3, 1945, in Cairo, Egypt.

== See also ==
- List of Egyptians
