= Zulfiqar =

Double-bladed sword in Islamic imagery

Zulfiqar or Zulfaqar (Arabic: ذو الْفَقار, romanized: Ḏū l-Faqār, IPA: [ðuː‿l.faˈqaːr]), also spelled Zu al-Faqar, Zulfakar, Dhu al-Faqar, or Dhulfaqar) is the sword of Ali ibn Abi Talib – a central figure of Shia Islam – that was, according to tradition, distinguished by having a double blade.

Middle Eastern weapons are commonly inscribed with a quote mentioning Zulfiqar, and they are at times made with a split tip in reference to the weapon.

== Name ==
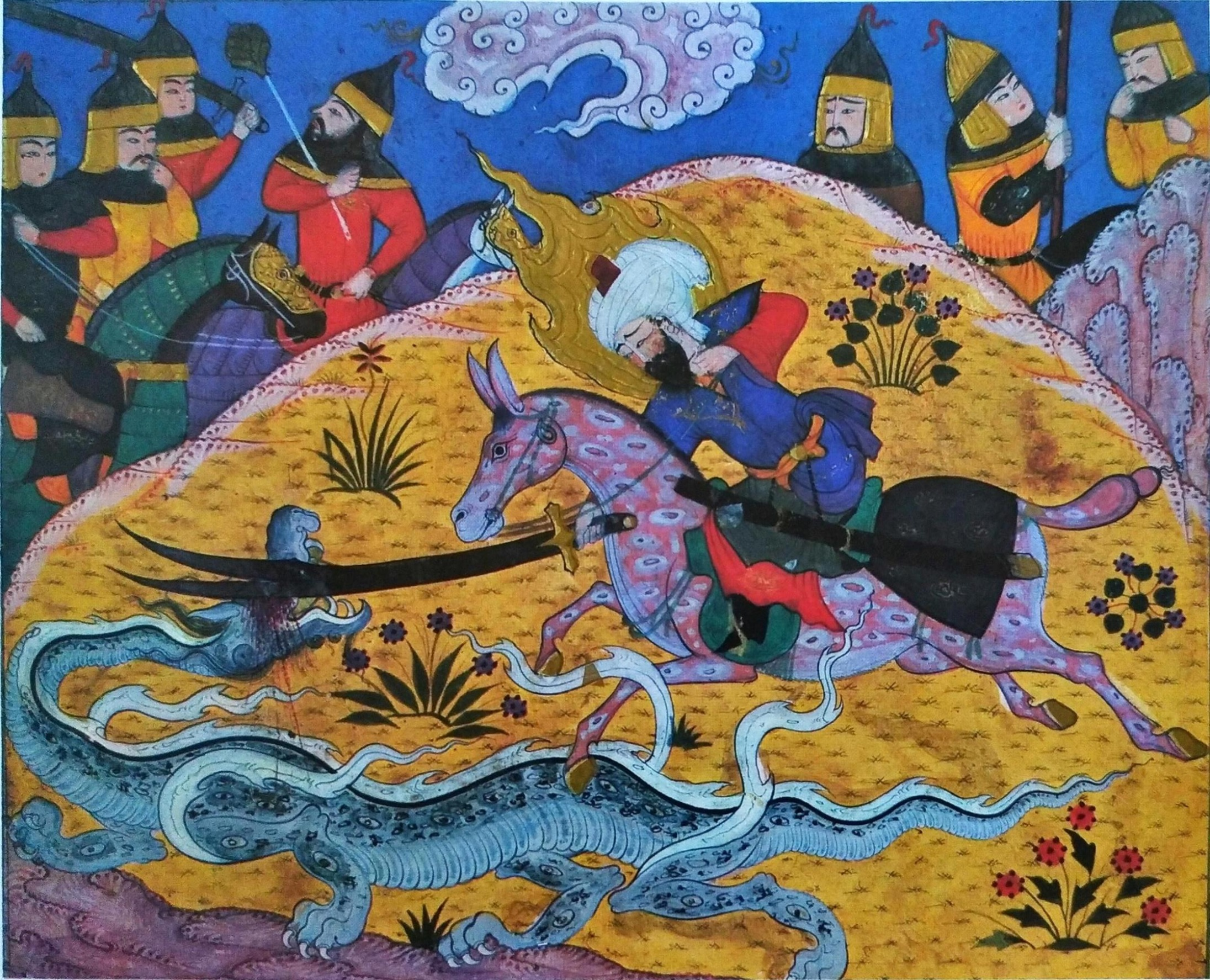
A Persian miniature from the Khawran Namah depicting Ali killing the dragon using his sword Zulfiqar.

The meaning of the name is uncertain. The word ḏū (ذُو) means 'possessor, master', and the idafa construction 'possessor of...' is common in Arabic phraseology, such as in Dhu al-Qarnayn, Dhu al-Kifl, Dhu al-Qadah and Dhu al-Hijjah.

The meaning of faqār (فَقَار), means "splitter, differentiatior". It is often vocalized as fiqār instead of faqār; Lane cites authorities preferring faqār however the vocalization fiqār still sees more widespread use. The word faqār has the meaning of 'vertebrae of the back, bones of the spine', which are set in regular order, one upon another, but may also refer to other instances of regularly spaced rows, specifically it is a name of the stars of the belt of Orion.

Interpretations of the sword's name as found in Islamic theological writings or popular piety fall into four categories:

- reference to the stars of the belt of Orion, emphasizing the celestial provenance of the sword
- interpretation of faqār as an unfamiliar plural of fuqrah 'notch, groove, indentation', interpreted as a reference to a kind of decoration of regularly spaced notches or dents on the sword
- reference to a 'notch' formed by the sword's supposed termination in two points
- reference to the literal vertebrae of the spine, yielding an interpretation in the sense of 'the severer of the vertebrae; the spine-splitter'

The latter interpretation gives rise to the popular depiction of the sword as a double-pointed scimitar in modern Shia iconography. Heger considers two additional possibilities:

- the name in origin referred simply to a double-edged sword, in Koine Greek the μάχαιρα δίστομη (máchaira dístomē) of the New Testament.
- fiqār is a corruption of firāq 'distinction, division', and the name originally referred to the metaphorical sword discerning between right and wrong.

== Invocation and depiction ==
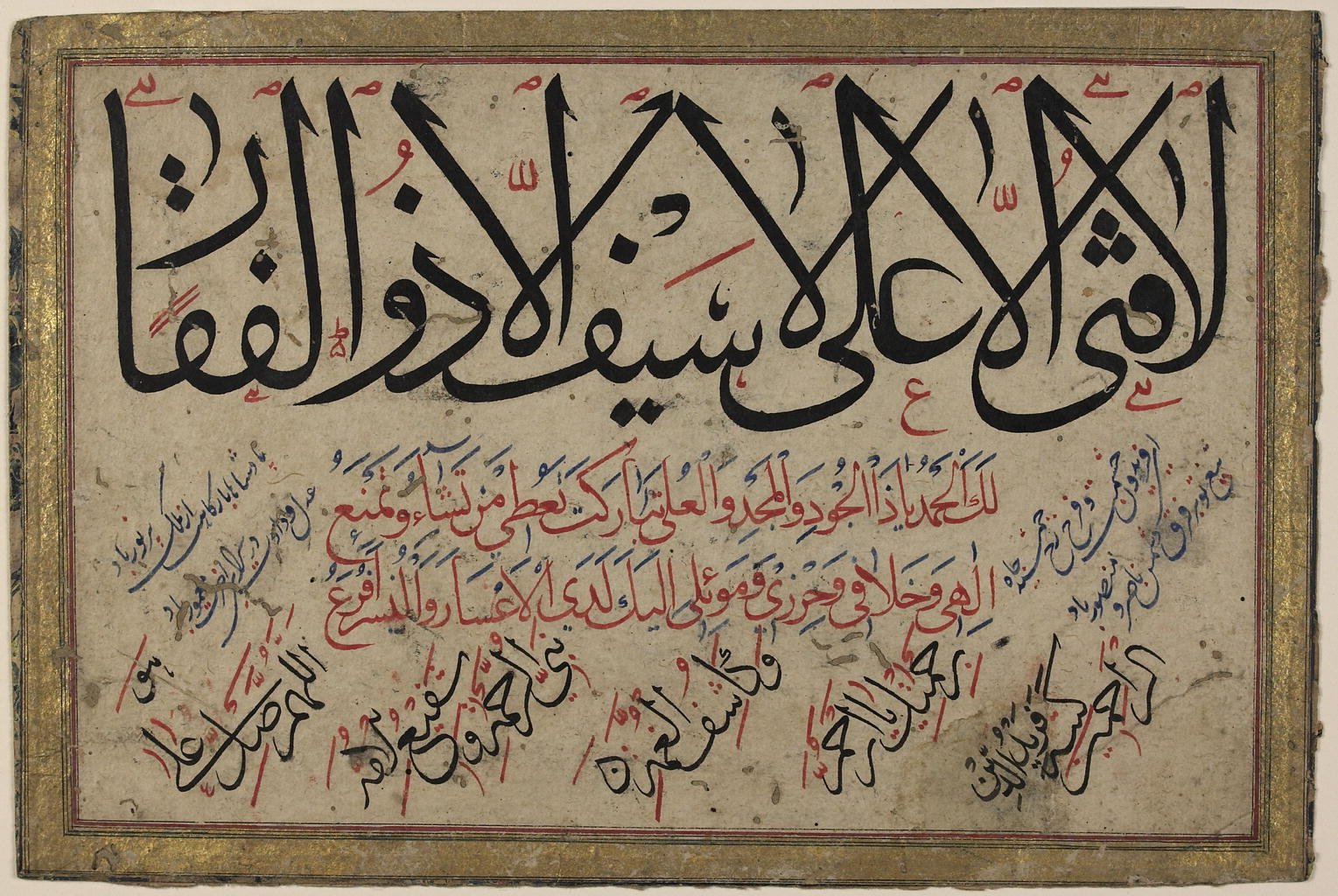
Calligraphic panel in praise of Ali. The large inscription at the top reads lā fatā ʾilā ʿAlī lā sayf ʾilā Ḏū l-Faqār meaning "There is no Hero but Ali, [and] there is no sword but Dhu-l-Faqar.

Zulfiqar was frequently depicted on Ottoman flags, (Note: "The sword, known as Zulfiqar, is explained as the visual representation of the spread of the Ottoman dominion over East and West, established with the Ottoman conquest of Constantinople and the death of Constantine XI Palaiologos (1453).") especially as used by Janissaries cavalry.

Zulfiqar is also frequently invoked in talismans. A common talismanic inscription or invocation is the double statement:

لَا سَيْفَ إِلَّا ذُو ٱلْفَقَارِ وَلَا فَتَىٰ إِلَّا عَلِيٌّ
lā sayfa ʾillā ḏū l-faqāri wa-lā fatā ʾillā ʿalīy^{un}
"There is no sword but the Zulfiqar, and there is no Hero but Ali"

The order of the two-part phrase is sometimes reversed, instead saying "there is no hero but Ali, and there is no sword but Zulfiqar". A record of this statement as part of a longer talismanic inscription was published by Tawfiq Canaan in The Decipherment of Arabic Talismans (1937). Heger (2008) speculates that the talismanic formula may be old and may have originated as a Arab Christian invocation.

== Legendary background ==
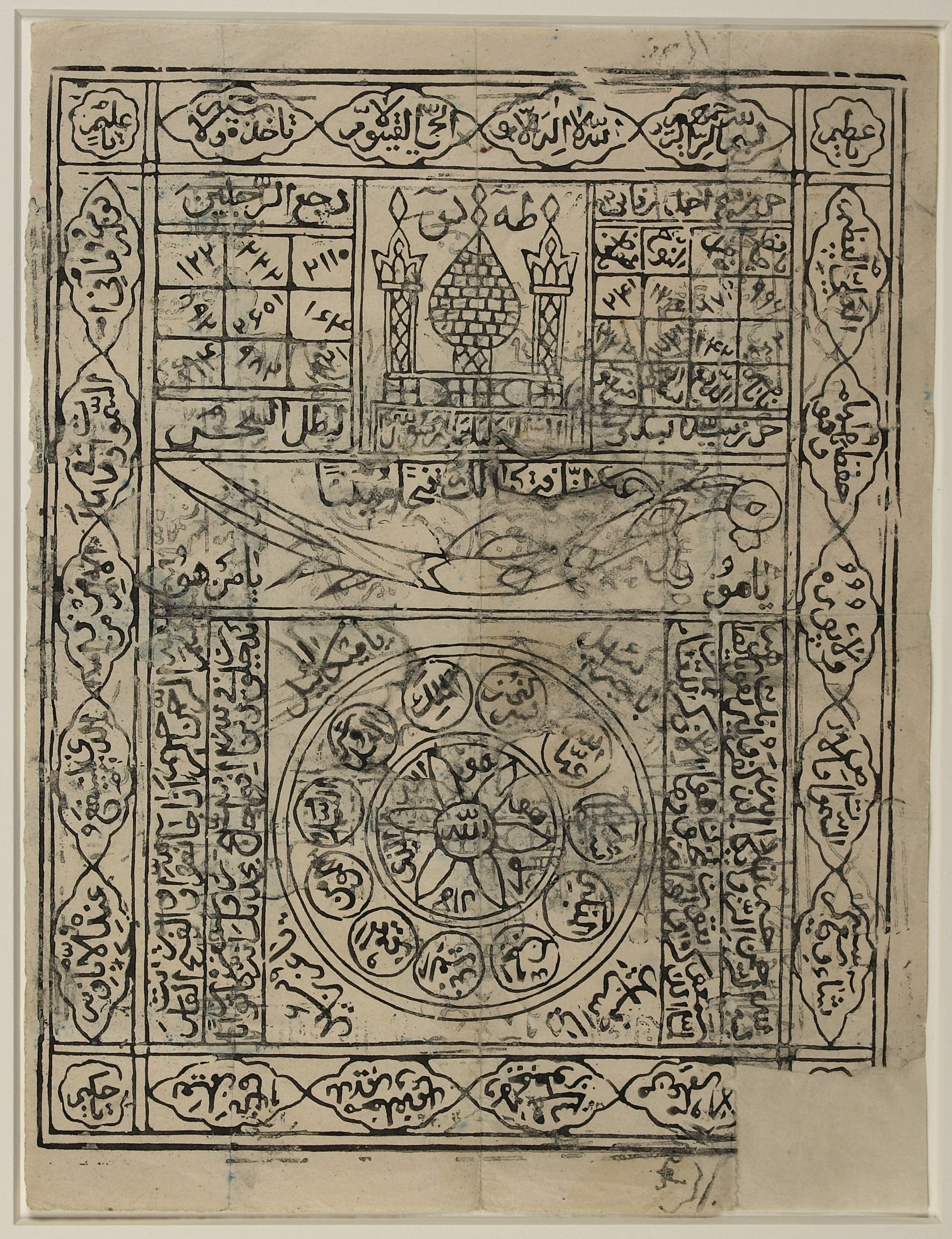
A stamped amulet, presumably made in India in the 19th century for a Shia patron. The amulet comprises gnostic squares, Qur'anic verses (including ayat al-kursi (2:255) running around the frame), divine or holy names, besides a depiction of Zulfiqar at the center.

In legend, the exclamation lā sayfa ʾillā Ḏū l-Faqāri wa-lā fatā ʾillā ʿAlīy^{un} was made for prophet Muhammad by Allah, Muhammad gave the sword to imam Ali ibn Abi Talib to replace his old broken sword.

Al-Tirmidhi attributes to Ibn Abbas the tradition that Muhammad acquired the sword on the day of Badr, after he had seen it in a dream concerning the day of Uhud.

== Historic examples ==
In Qajar Iran, actual swords were produced based on the legendary double-pointed design. The Higgins Armory Museum collection, now at the Worcester Art Museum, holds a ceremonial sabre with a wootz steel blade, dated to the late 19th century, with a cleft tip. The curator comments that "fractures in the tip were not uncommon in early wootz blades from Arabia" suggesting that the legendary double-pointed design is based on a common type of damage incurred by blades in battle. The tip of this specimen is split in the blade plane, i.e. "For about 8" of its length from the point the blade is vertically divided along its axis, producing side-by-side blades, each of which is finished in itself", in the curator's opinion "a virtuoso achievement by a master craftsman". Another 19th-century blade in the same collection features a split blade as well as saw-tooths along the edge, combining two possible interpretations of the name Dhu-l-Faqar. This blade is likely of Indian workmanship, and it was combined with an older (Mughal era) Indian hilt.

== Modern references ==
In Iran, the name of the sword has been used as an eponym in military contexts; thus, Reza Shah Pahlavi renamed the military order Decoration of the Commander of the Faithful to Order of Zolfaghar in 1925. An Iranian main battle tank called Zulfiqar is named after the sword. An Iranian short-range ballistic missile is named Zolfaghar. The 58th Takavar Division of Shahroud is also named after the sword.

At least three ships of the Pakistan Navy have been named PNS Zulfiqar.

A Shia Islamist militant group in Iraq is named Liwa Zulfiqar.

== Gallery ==
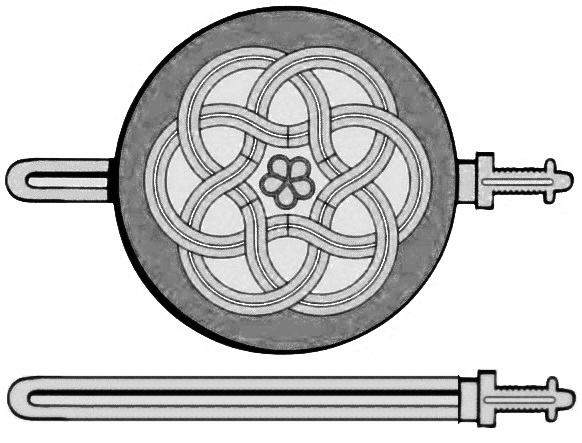
Drawing of Fatimid version of Zulfiqar in the 10th-century; the earliest visual depiction in history, as carved on Bab al-Nasr, one of the gates of Cairo.

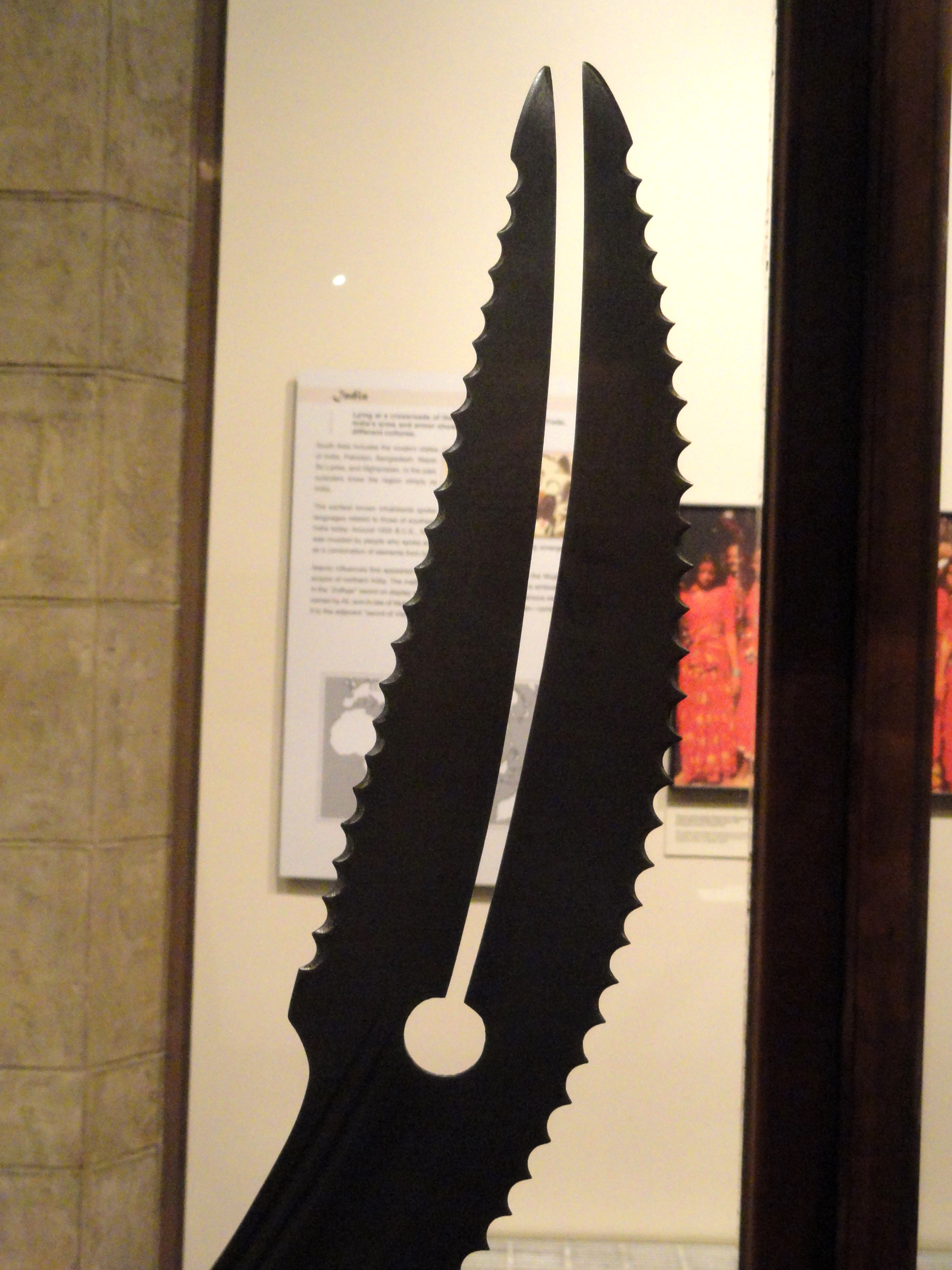
Closeup of the saw-toothed and notched point of the 19th-century Indian-made "Zulfiqar" sword kept in the Higgins Collection (accession no. 2240); circa 1800

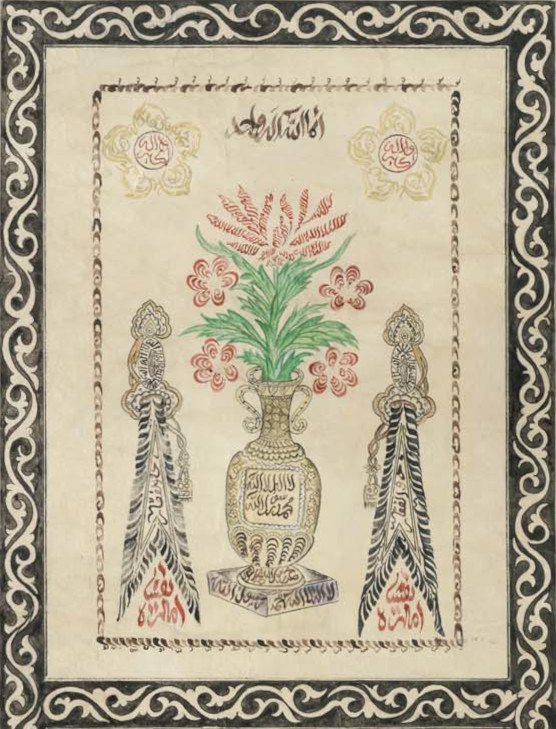
Two Zulfiqar swords on a Chinese Islamic scroll, 1845

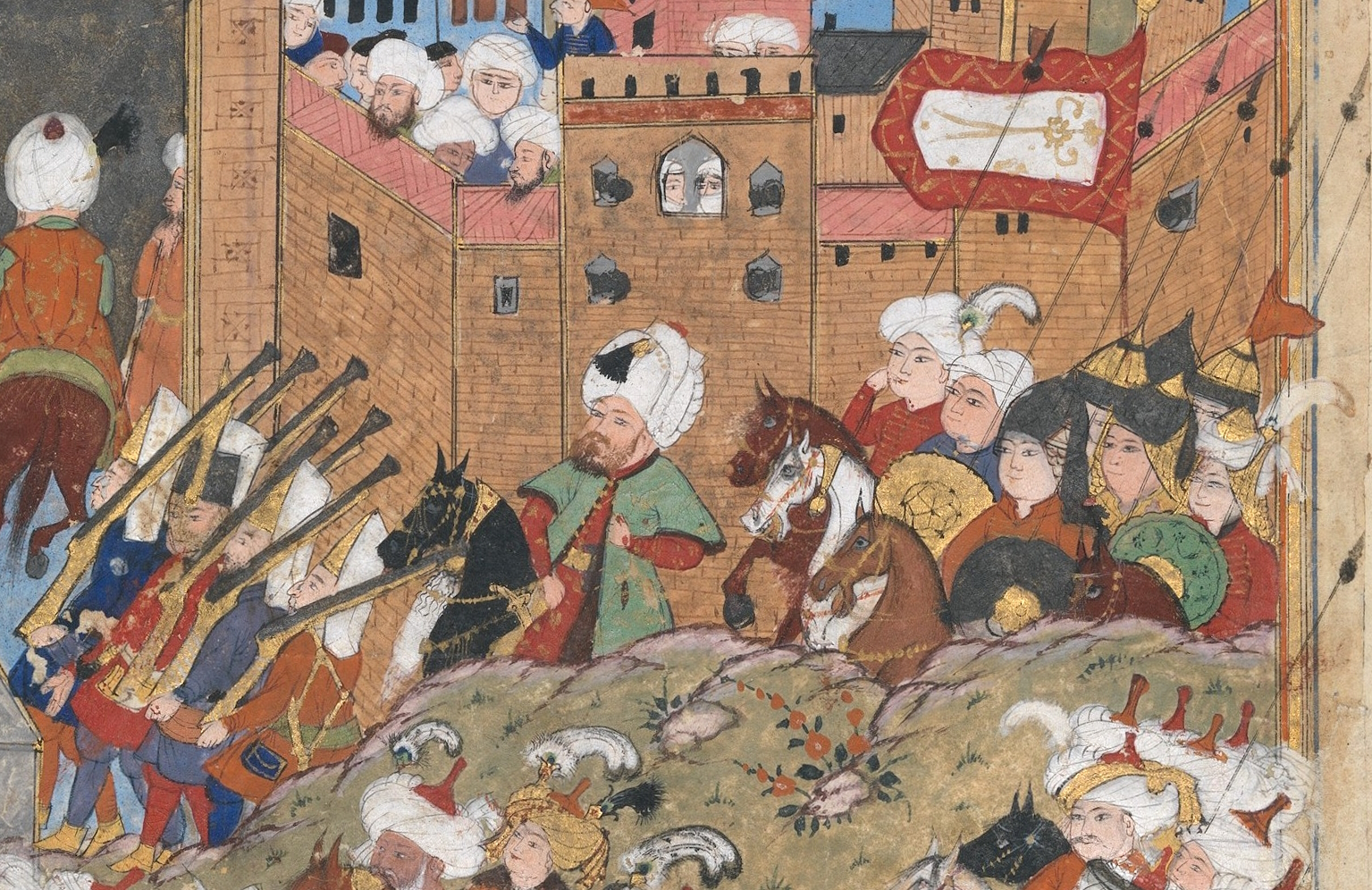
Sokulluzade Hasan Pasha (center) leading in troops with a Zulfiqar Ottoman flag in 1590. Divan of Mahmud Abd al-Baki, 1590–95

An Indian shamshir (at top) converted into a replica of Zulfiqar.

== See also ==
- Arab sword
- Bara Sangihe, the Sangirese sword of Indonesia also has a split blade
