= Zulfiqar Ali Kalhoro =

Pakistani anthropologist, research scholar, and author

Zulfiqar Ali Kalhoro (Urdu: ذوالفقار علی کلھوڑو, Sindhi: ذوالفقار علي ڪلهوڙو) is a Pakistani anthropologist, research scholar, and author. He works at the Pakistan Institute of Development Economics (PIDE) Islamabad.

== Early life ==
Kalhoro was born to Mir Muhammad Kalhoro on 4 January 1977 at village Abad Kalhora Larkana District now Qambar Shahdadkot District, Sindh Pakistan. He attended Govt. Pilot High School Larkana. Later he moved to Islamabad for further education and did a master's in anthropology and a PhD degree. He has written articles and books in English. He has attended many national and international conferences.

== Bibliography ==
- Perspective on the Art and Architecture of Sindh (2014)
- Memorial Stones Tharparkar, Sindh (2017)
- Studies in Kalhora History: Economy and Architecture (2017)
- Symbols in Stone: The Rock Art of Sindh (2018)
- The Rock Art of Karachi (2020)
- Wall Paintings of Sindh (2020)
- Reflections on Pothohar Heritage (2020)
- Glimpses of Sindhi Heritage (2021)
- Memories, Mystics, and Monuments of Pothohar (2022)
- Saints, Sufis and Shrines: The Mystical Landscape of Sindh (2022)
