= Ahmed Shafik (surgeon) =

Egyptian researcher (1933–2007)

- أحمد شفيق
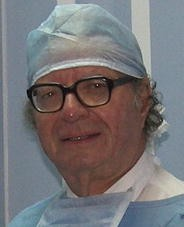
- Born: 10 May 1933; Shebin-El-Kom, Kingdom of Egypt
- Died: October 31, 2007 (aged 74); Paris, France
- Resting place: Cairo, Egypt
- Education: Cairo University
- Known for: Research in anatomy, physiology and surgery
- Spouse: Dr. Olfat El-Sibai
- Awards: Egyptian State Prize for Science and Arts, 1st Class (1977), four time nominee for Nobel Prize in Physiology or Medicine, Harvard University Ig Nobel Prize (2016)
- Scientific career
- Fields: General surgery, colorectal surgery, urology, andrology, sexology, proctology, and anatomy
- Workplaces: Ahmed Shafik Hospital, Al Kasr Al Ainy
- Thesis: Adrenocortical Function in Stress Conditions (1962)
- Website: www.ahmedshafik.com

Ahmed Shafik (10 May 1933 – October 31, 2007) was an Egyptian surgeon and medical researcher whose work focused on colorectal and pelvic floor surgery, as well as aspects of human physiology and sexual health. He published extensively and introduced several surgical procedures, including those related to urinary diversion and pelvic reconstruction.

Over the course of his career, he authored more than 1,000 peer-reviewed publications.

== Early life and education ==
Shafik was born on May 10, 1933, in Menoufia, Egypt. He graduated with honors from the Faculty of Medicine, Cairo University in 1957, receiving his MD in 1962. He later joined the university's faculty, holding various academic and clinical positions. In 1990, he was appointed Professor and Chairman of the Department of Surgery and Experimental Research.

== Career ==
Shafik contributed to advancing colorectal and pelvic floor surgery. In 1964, he introduced the cutaneous uretero-ureterostomy urinary diversion (Shafik I), a procedure for reconstructing the urinary system in patients with compromised bladder function. Later, in 1967, he performed the first bladder transplant, a milestone in urology that helped set the stage for further developments in organ transplantation.

Following his work on urinary diversion, Shafik developed the perineal ileo-urethral neo-bladder (Shafik II), a reconstructive technique that preserves bladder function for individuals with severe pelvic trauma or bladder cancer. His articles discussing these procedures and findings are published under the names "Shafik I" in The Journal of Urology and "Shafik II" in the British Journal of Urology (BJUI) and other medical literature.

In 1991, Shafik identified pudendal canal syndrome, a condition resulting from compression of the pudendal nerve. Recognizing the syndrome's clinical implications, he introduced surgical decompression as a treatment, advancing approaches to chronic pelvic pain management and establishing a foundation for further research into pelvic nerve disorders.

Shafik's research extended beyond traditional surgical topics; he became known for his studies on how external factors affect physiology and behavior. In 2016, he was awarded the Ig Nobel Prize for his study on the effects of different textiles (polyester, cotton, and wool trousers) on the sexual activity of rats. His research suggested that polyester-induced static electricity could negatively impact reproductive health, providing insights into how fabric types might influence human physiology as well. In addition to this animal study, he conducted further research examining the contraceptive efficacy of polyester in inducing azoospermia in men, findings that were published in Contraception and European Urology.

Shafik identified and documented over 80 anatomical reflexes, many of which pertain to sexual physiology. Notably, he studied the vaginocavernosus reflex, which highlights a synergistic relationship between male and female anatomy during sexual activity.

Throughout his career, Shafik authored over 1,000 peer-reviewed articles and reviews, covering many topics in anatomy, physiology, and experimental surgery.

=== "Triple-loop" theory of the external anal sphincter ===
Shafik's "triple-loop" theory of the external anal sphincter has significantly influenced our understanding of anorectal anatomy. In his 1975 study, Shafik described the external anal sphincter as comprising three loops: the top, intermediate, and base loops, each with distinct anatomical features and functions.

Subsequent research has utilized advanced imaging techniques to validate and expand upon Shafik's findings. A 2008 analysis confirmed the triple-loop configuration of the external anal sphincter using coronal and coronally reconstructed imaging modalities. Further studies have also explored the functional implications of the triple-loop system. For instance, research into the role of the levator ani muscle during defecation has provided additional insights into the complex interactions within the pelvic floor musculature, building on Shafik's foundation.

== Awards and recognition ==
Shafik received numerous accolades throughout his career. In 1977, he was awarded the Egyptian State Prize for Science and Art, First Class, for his exceptional contributions to medical research and surgical innovation. He was a four-time nominee for the Nobel Prize in Physiology or Medicine, Harvard University Ig Nobel Prize (2016). He was also honored with honorary fellowships from institutions such as the Italian Academy of Coloproctology and the Société Nationale Française de Coloproctologie (SNFCP). His influence extended internationally, including as a founding member and President-Elect of the International Society of University Colon and Rectal Surgeons (ISUCRS) from 2004 to 2006.

== Death ==
Shafik died on November 1, 2007, at the Georges Pompidou European Hospital in Paris, France, at 74, due to cardiac arrest. Before his death, he experienced a heart attack while in Egypt's North Coast region. Delays and inadequacies in medical care during this time contributed to the deterioration of his condition.

== Legacy ==
Shafik's published research includes over 1,000 peer-reviewed papers covering topics from pelvic floor reflexes to innovative surgical techniques. His work has significantly advanced the understanding of anorectal physiology and pelvic floor disorders.

Shafik's techniques in colorectal and pelvic floor surgery are frequently referenced and adapted by modern surgeons.

Shafik pursued knowledge with a scientific philosophy reminiscent of 19th-century polymaths. His engagement with taboo subjects, such as sexology in conservative societies, positioned him as a pioneering figure in his field. While some in the international scientific community questioned his findings due to limited replication, others praised his boldness and the breadth of his inquiries.
