= Women in Yemen =

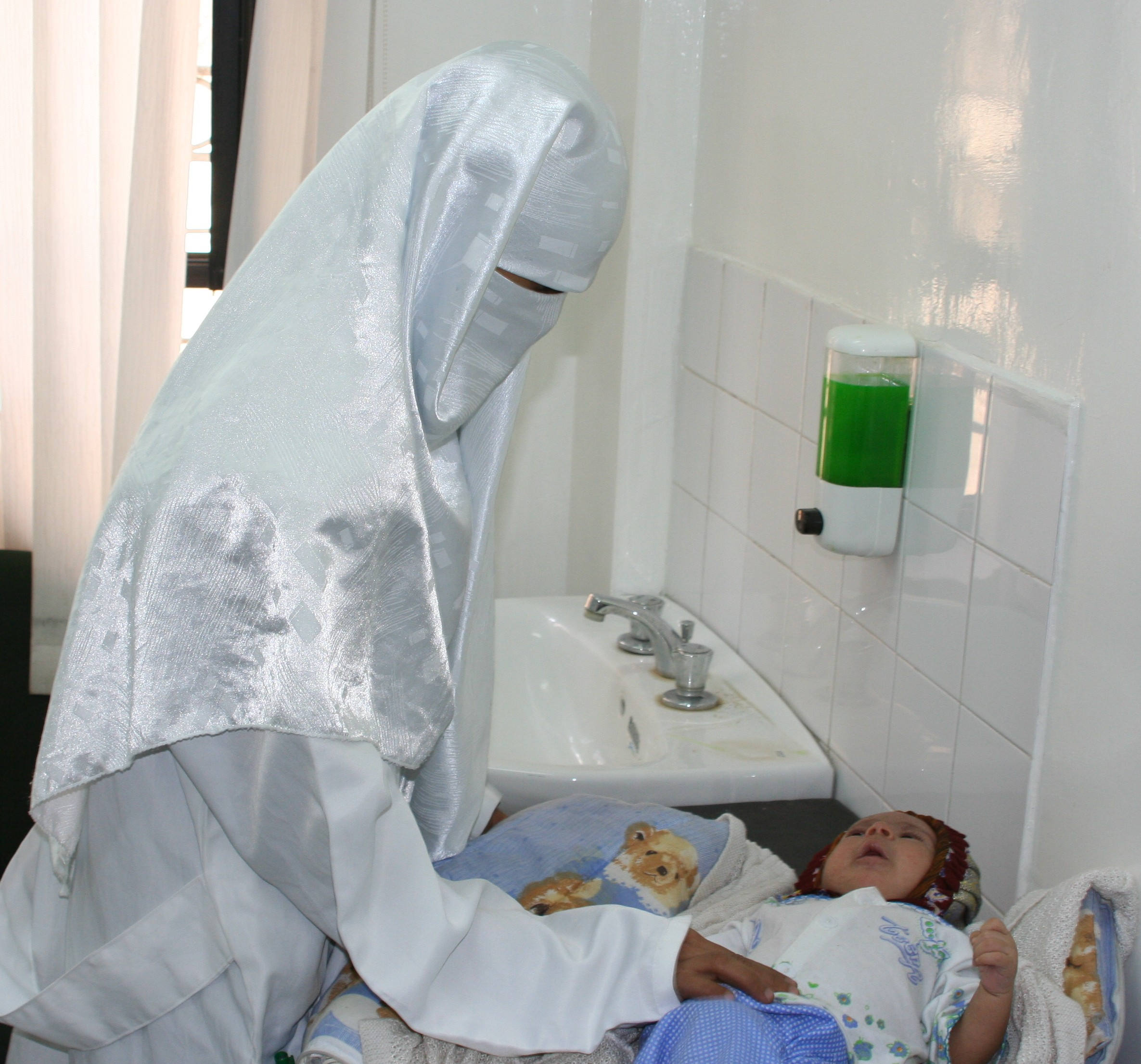
- A female Yemeni doctor examines an infant

General statistics
- Maternal mortality (per 100,000): 164 (2017)
- Women in parliament: 1.0% (2019)
- Women over 25 with secondary education: 19.9% (2017)
- Women in labour force: 5.8% (2019)

Gender Inequality Index
- Value: 0.820 (2021)
- Rank: 170th out of 191

Global Gender Gap Index
- Value: 0.492 (2021)
- Rank: 155th out of 156

Women in Yemen suffer from gender-based discrimination due to the highly patriarchal character of Yemeni society. Although the government of Yemen has made efforts to improve the rights of women (including the formation of a Women's Development Strategy and a Women Health Development Strategy), many cultural and religious norms stand in the way of equal rights for women. Poor enforcement of the legislation by the Yemeni government exacerbates the problem.

As of 2017, Yemeni women do not hold many economic, social or cultural rights. While suffrage was gained in 1967 and constitutional and legal protection was extended to women during the first years of Yemen unity between 1990 and 1994, they continue to struggle "in exercising their full political and civil rights".

On the other hand, women played major roles in Yemeni society in earlier times. Some women of pre-Islamic and early Islamic Yemen held elite status. The Queen of Sheba has been hailed as a "source of pride for the Yemeni nation". In addition, Queen Arwa has been noted for building up the country and promoting greater prosperity under her rule.

In modern day Yemen, women are subject to tribal and patriarchal traditions that keep them from advancing. Combined with illiteracy and poverty, this has led to women in Yemen being deprived of their rights as citizens.

Due to the ongoing armed conflict in Yemen since the end of March 2015, Yemen is undergoing a humanitarian crisis. The conflict has brought numerous accusations of violations and abuses of international human rights law and violations of international humanitarian law. The events have been brutal, and have had cruel consequences on all civilians, but especially on the lives of women and young girls. Due to the tension and chaos of the crisis, combined with the deep-rooted gender inequality, conditions for women and girls in Yemen are deteriorating as the conflict drags on. Women and girls have been left vulnerable to inhumane violence, physical and psychological abuse and exploitation.

== Women's rights in the People's Democratic Republic of Yemen (South Yemen: 1967–1990) ==
Following the eviction of British colonial forces in November 1967, the leadership of Yemen's revolutionary National Liberation Front (NLF) installed a progressive Marxist government based in Aden, the former seat of colonial power in South Yemen. Women had been involved in the revolution as both political and military operatives, and this involvement contributed to the standing of women in the PDRY. At the outset of the post-colonial period, the NLF leadership recognized pervasive gender discrimination as a serious handicap which would invariably hinder the progressive development of an egalitarian society. The 1970 constitution of the PDRY guaranteed that:

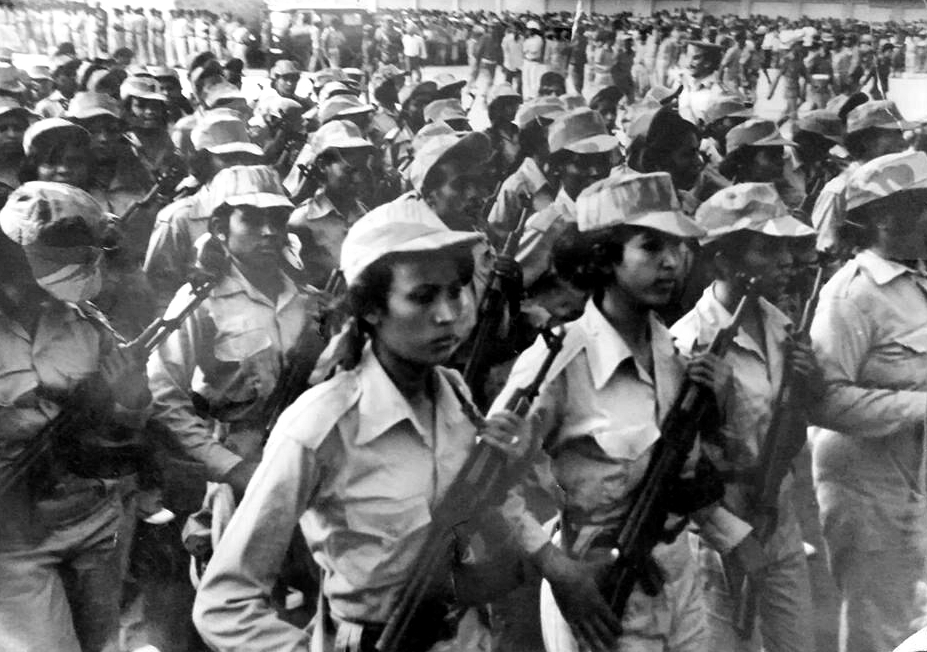
South Yemeni women students marching

It shall work for the widest participation of Yemeni women in economic, social and political life and the raising of their educational, cultural, vocational, and technical capabilities. It shall struggle vigorously for the purpose of affirming and protecting the rights guaranteed to women by the constitution and the laws on the basis of parity with men.

Women were also granted the right to vote immediately following independence from Great Britain in 1967. In practice however, women remained chronically underrepresented in the PDRY government; the first woman to serve in parliament was in 1990.

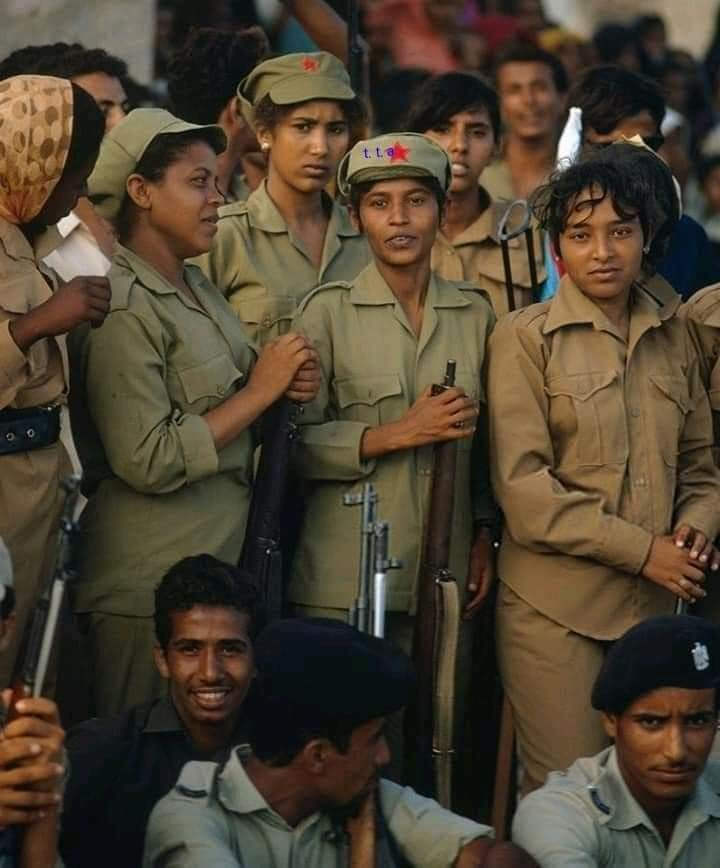
Women students in military uniform with rifles

Nevertheless, these developments represented a remarkable step forward for women residing in South Yemen. In fact, these rights extended into the private sphere, in particular regarding the regulation of marriage. For example, the 1974 Family Law outlines marriage as "a contract between a man and a woman, equal in rights and responsibilities, made on the basis of mutual understanding and respect." Helen Lackner points out that "Along with the Tunisian Family Code, this law is the most progressive to be found in any Arab state."

Such laws provided the legal infrastructure necessary to promote a revolutionary reorganization of society in accordance with the fundamental principle of gender equality, and social egalitarianism more generally. Furthermore, the P.D.R.Y. attempted to mobilize women in rural areas through the creation of the General Union of Yemeni Women, which was responsible for protecting and promoting the interests of women. The women's union provided literacy courses and vocational training, while in a broader sense setting an example for society that women can and "should be encouraged to participate fully and equally in society."

Women interviewed in 2010 and 2018 about how conditions had changed since unification in 1990 said that the PDRY was a better time for women.

== Access to justice ==
While Article 40 and 41 of the 1990 unification constitution of Yemen stipulates that all citizens are considered equal before the law and that "Every citizen has the right to participate in the political, economic, social and cultural life of the country" gender discrimination is prevalent in Yemen.

The addition of Article 31 to the constitution, contradicts article 40 by stating that "Women are the sisters of men... they have rights and duties, which are guaranteed and assigned by Shari'a and stipulated by law" has seemingly nullified the equality extended by the constitution due to its use as a base for discriminatory laws. This is due to the specific reading of Shari'a, which restricts the rights of women. Today, many Yemeni activist women believe that Shari'a can be interpreted to further include women in the social, political, economic, and cultural life of the country.

Many of the discriminatory policies restrict familial rights of women. Women in Yemen cannot marry a non-Yemeni without approval from both her family and the state. Further, under the Nationality Law of 1990, Yemeni women cannot pass their citizenship onto their children unless the woman divorces her husband, her husband is found to be insane or her husband dies, in which case the children can gain citizenship when they turn 19. The children of Yemeni men married to foreigners, on the other hand, are ensured Yemeni citizenship. Further, divorce and even testimony of women is not equal to that of Yemeni men. Yemeni men have the right to divorce their wives at any time without justification, a woman on the other hand must go through a process of litigation in which they justify their reason for nullifying the marriage contract. Before the court, a woman is considered only half a person, that is it takes "the testimony of two women" to equal "the testimony of one man." Additionally, women are prohibited from testifying in cases of adultery, slander, theft or sodomy by Article 45 (21) of the 1992 Evidence Law.

Other laws that discriminate against women are: Personal Status Law (1992) and Penal Code Law (1994). The Personal Status Law contravenes parts of the Convention on Eliminating All Forms of Discrimination Against Women (CEDAW), by stating that women are required to provide sexual access to her husband, basically permitting rape within a marriage. Likewise, provisions in the Penal Code increase the vulnerability of women to violence. Article 232 of the Penal Code allows for reduced and lenient sentences of men convicted of so-called "honour killing". Under Yemeni law murder is punishable by death, however the Penal Code imposes a maximum prison sentence of only one year in cases of "honour killings".

== Gender-based violence ==
There are a number of forms of violence that women in Yemen are exposed to, and these include: physical and psychological abuse from family members, forced marriage, sexual harassment, forced pregnancy, rape, polygamy, health services deprivation and female genital mutilation/cutting (FGM/C). Forced marriage and FGM/C are considered part of culture and tradition, and therefore they are not viewed as a form of violence in Yemen. In fact, 94% of FGM/C is not done by certified medical doctors, due to ministerial decree issued by the Minister of Health that bans FGM/C in the official centers; as a result, FGM/C has been conducted in the homes. FGM/C is done as a result of cultural practices, lack of knowledge of the risk connected with this harmful procedure, and law of prohibiting this behaviour.

Within Yemeni society, there is a strong preference for male children, as well as a high tolerance of violent behaviour towards females. Thus, female children are often disciplined and punished, if they challenge this behaviour, and attempt to defend themselves. These practices do not only take place inside the homes, but also in schools, social institutes and workplaces. National and local media in fact, often encourage and reinforce the tendency for such discriminating acts and behaviour.

The most vulnerable group of women exposed to violence in Yemen is marginalized, poor and rural women. While conditions of poverty tend to intensify forms of instances of violence against women, rural women are also forced to carry out most agricultural work and physical labour. In 2022 Huda Ali Alawi, Director of the Women Research and Training Center at Aden University, reported that the Yemeni Civil War had driven an increase of gender-based violence in Yemen.

=== Discriminatory laws ===
Women in Yemen are also subjected to violence through the institutionalization of discriminatory laws. Article 42 of the Crimes and Punishment Law No 12 (1994) amounts a woman's blood money (diya) as half of a man's, effectively devaluing the female's life to half as much as a man's. In the incident of unintended killing, law identifies a compensation for killing a male, of one million Yemeni Rial (YR), which is around US$5,000. However, female victims' families are compensated half that amount with only 500,000YR, which is US$2,500.

Amendments to other laws in the late 1990s further lowered the status of Yemeni women. For example, in the 1992 version of the Personal Status Law, the minimum age for marriage was 15, however, in the 1998 amendment, the wording was replaced with general terms, which ultimately amounted to the legalisation of marriage contracts for minors. Under Article No. 15 of the current Personal Status law, it is stated that marriage to a "little girl" is valid, unless she is not ready for sex. What the article is conveying, is that girls under 15, may be forced to marry, if they are ready to engage in sexual relations. On that, the law disregards the fact that, despite the physical and psychological capability to engage in sexual relations, decision to do so should be a personal one, and should depend on the wishes of each individual woman. Personal Status Law also enables marital rape and domestic violence. For example, Article 40 as revised in 1998, provides that a woman must be obedient to her husband. In doing so, Article 40 does not allow a woman to leave her home without her husband's permission. The husband is also allowed to have sexual relations with his wife, whenever he pleases, and she should allow that in return.

=== Human rights ===
The international community has recognized that violence against women is a violation of women's human rights, their bodily integrity, and their sexual and reproductive rights. It is also acknowledged that promotion of women's rights is a means to ensure sustainable development. The Convention on the Elimination of All Forms of Discrimination Against Women (CEDAW) 1979 imposes legally binding duties to eliminate discrimination against women and ensure equality between women and men.

Allegations of violence and sexual abuse in Yemen have been reported by the Office of the United Nations High Commissioner for Human Rights (OHCHR). In July 2015, OHCHR visited Thawra hospital in Sana'a reported on alleged cases of rape inflicted on internally displaced persons. In February 2016, an OHCHR monitor visited the women's central prison in Sana'a, where four victims reported that they had been blindfolded during their capture and subjected to electric shocks.

== Political rights ==
Women in Yemen have always had limited participation in society, as men are considered the primary decision makers both inside and outside the household. Thus, women have always been grossly underrepresented in Yemeni politics. This has not, however, prevented women from trying to make their voices heard through strikes and peaceful protests. Some progress has been made since 2011, as the 2011 Uprising challenged the norm of women's limited participation. Women were at the heart of protests, demanding and protesting for a better political life. Then in 2014, women represented more than one quarter of the participants in the National Dialogue Conference (NDC). Through that, women of Yemen achieved important agreements, including the 30% quota for women's political participation. During the NDC, many women delegates were publicly threatened for participating and were even physically attacked on the streets. To support the women and their movements, several women's human rights organisations, such as the Sisters Arab Forum for Human Rights, increased their efforts and encouraged women to continue participating and fighting for the issues they were passionate about. The international community applauded the positive outcomes of the NDC process as this was a very significant change for women's participation in the Yemeni politics, in comparison to the previous years. In fact, in 2008 an attempt was made to introduce 15% quota for women in parliament, however this process was abandoned, after Islamic clerics and tribal chiefs intervened and held a "Meeting for Protecting Virtue and Fighting Vice", proclaiming that a woman's place is at home. In the former national parliament, women held only 0.3% of the seats.

Despite the achievements made in 2014 by the NDC, women's political participation has been suspended as a result of the current ongoing conflict. Amat al-Aleem al-Asbahi, a Taiz female literacy activist, was assassinated on 25 December 2016.

== Social and cultural rights ==
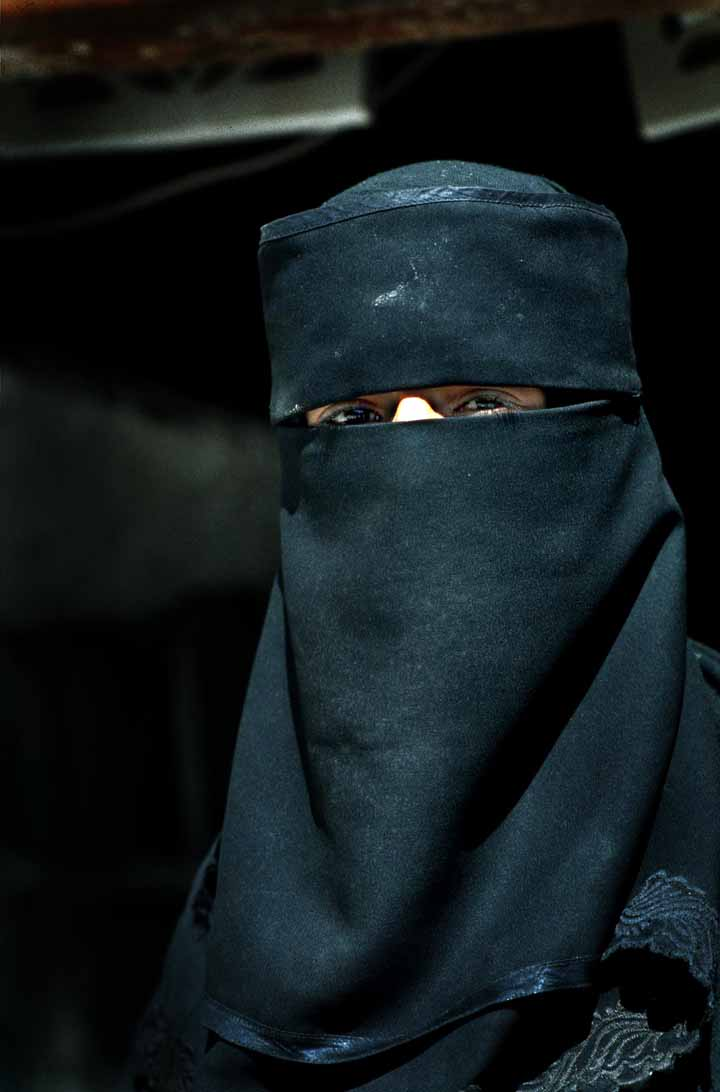
A woman wearing a niqāb in Yemen

Yemen is a society with the cultural attitude, that women have a low status in the family, as well as in the community. A man is allowed to marry up to four wives as long as he has the financial means, however a woman is not even entitled to enter marriage under her own free will, as she needs the approval and agreement of a male guardian. In case of divorce, children can be removed from the mother's care, while the father does not face such risks of losing his children. A woman is also not allowed to deny visitation rights for the father, while the father is allowed to do so under Article 145 of the Personal Status Act.

Health and reproductive rights are also major issues for Yemeni women. No legislation protects their freedom to make their own decisions with regards to these issues and thus women are controlled by their family or, if married, by their husbands. Further, Yemen is a country where female genital mutilation (FGM) remains an issue, even after being banned by the Ministry of Public Health and Population. In addition, many women are forced to marry at a young age, made possible by state policies, which gives the family the control over whether or not a girl marries and when. Child marriage is a problem with a report of 52% of Yemeni girls getting married before the age of 18, including 14% before the age of 15. With the recent conflict, this trend has reportedly increased. Many families have used it as a coping mechanism during the ongoing crisis, and as a way of accessing dowry payments. The common practice of forcing young girls to marry was condemned by an NGO as "child rape condoned under the guise of marriage." Yemen has a tribal culture, and the marriage of young girls is common; most Yemeni girls are married before they reach puberty. A proposed law setting a minimum age for marriage of 17 for women was opposed by conservative Yemenis, including women.

== Education rights ==
Men and women do not have the same rights for education in Yemen. The country is still a long way from achieving gender equality, despite Article 54 of the Constitution of the Republic of Yemen, which states:

Education is a right for all citizens. The state shall guarantee education in accordance with the law through building various schools and cultural and educational institutions. Basic education is obligatory. The state shall do its best to obliterate illiteracy and give special care to expanding technical and vocational education. The state shall give special attention to young people and protect them against perversions, provide them with religious, mental and physical education, and the appropriate environment to develop their aptitude in all fields.

According to a survey done by UNICEF in 2013, girls are 50% less likely to enroll in school compared to boys, and they are also less likely to complete basic secondary and post-secondary education. Other studies have found that girls are usually more likely to drop out of school, than boys. For example, a study done in 2014 by Yemeni Ministry of Education, found that girls are 17% more likely to drop out of school at the primary school level, while 23% more likely than boys to drop out of school by the lower secondary level. Human Rights Watch has documented that forced child marriage is a leading factor as to why girls drop out of school. In the Demographic and Health Survey of 2013, it was discovered that only 6% of women had continued their education post-secondary school, while a survey done by UNICEF found that 71% of schools do not have female teachers. Due to the high percentage drop-out, women have lower literacy rate than men. According to the 2013 Global Gender Gap, only 49% of women in Yemen are literate, in contrast to 82% of men being literate.

Young girls and women aged 15-25 have a higher literary rate, estimated at 76.9% showing improvement among younger generations compared to past ones.

== Economic rights ==
In the World Economic Forum's 2014 Gender Gap Report, out of the 142 countries included in the report, Yemen ranked last, and has continued to do so since 2007. While women have the legal rights to ownership and use of property, many women in Yemen give administrative rights to male members of their family because they are not aware of their rights. This has been attributed to "widespread illiteracy, patriarchal attitudes, and women's ignorance of their economic rights". In 2003, it was estimated that only 30% of the Yemeni female population was literate. As Elhum Haghight-Sordellini points out, growth of the economy "can create a powerful need to bring women into the labor force", however, Yemen's "lack of economic growth and dependency on more developed nations" and more general instability can "prevent social change". Economic issues are made worse in Yemen by "jobless growth in the face of a rising population". Today, 41.8% of Yemen's population lives below the National Poverty line, many of them women. (undmg Yemen). This may be attributed to the large education gap between men and women in Yemen, as well as prevalent and illegal discrimination in the workforce against women. Freedom House reported that while 73% of boys were enrolled in primary school in rural areas, only 30% of girls enrolled. Though the 1995 Labor Law prohibits workplace discrimination based on gender, it is not enforced in practice, therefore greatly limiting opportunities for women.

While Yemeni women are not prohibited to work, there are other barriers that make it difficult for them to seek employment. Firstly, as mentioned above, women lack in education. Secondly, the Personal Status Law does not allow a woman to leave the house, unless with permission from her husband, and thirdly, culturally, Yemeni women are expected to stay home and take care of the children, so that denies them access to employment opportunities. For these reasons and more, in 2013 the World Economic Forum reported that the female unemployment was 41%, compared to the men's which was only 12%.

== Nobel Prize ==
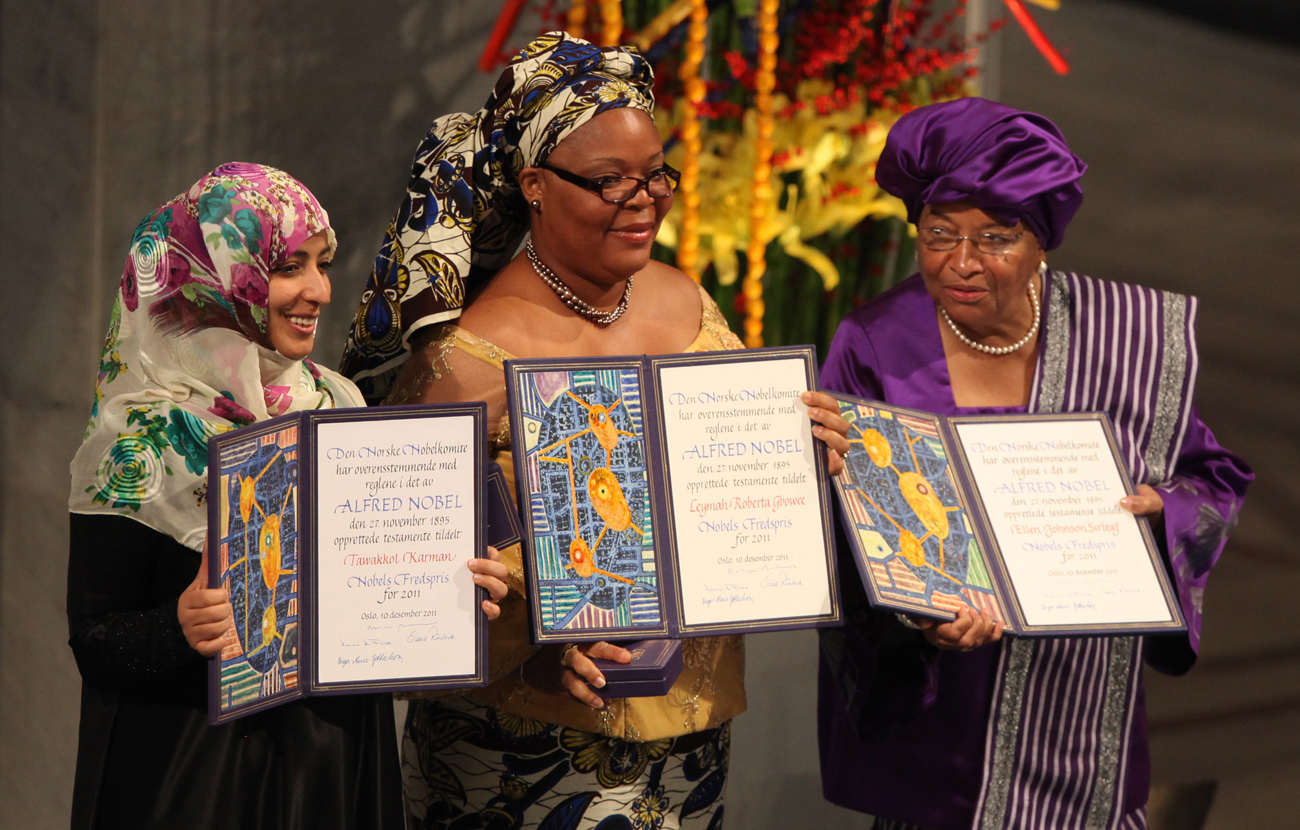
Tawakul Karman (left), Yemeni journalist and joint recipient of the 2011 Nobel peace prize, Leymah Gbowee (middle), Johnson Sirleaf (right)

Yemeni women's rights activist Tawakul Karman, founder and chair of Women Journalists Without Chains (WJWC), was one of three recipients of the 2011 Nobel Peace Prize. As one Al Jazeera article points out, the awards serve as "an accolade for the entire Arab Spring" as well as a recognition of "women power in the advent of the Arab Spring". The Nobel committee stated that Karman was specifically awarded the prize because of her "non-violent struggle for the safety of women". ("Profile: Tawakul Karman" Al Jazeera) Since 2007, Karman has organized and led demonstrations and sit-ins on numerous occasions with numerous Yemeni women intent on gaining more equality.

== Industry ==
Harbia Al Himiary, is a female engineer leading a UNESCO project intended to restore Yemen's culture and heritage, specifically the World Heritage Sites, in the midst of the Yemeni Civil War.

== See also ==
- Women in Islam
- Women in Arab societies
- Yemeni Civil War (2015–present)
- Education in Yemen
- Women in Asia
