= Hamida Zakariya =

South Yemeni judge

Hamida Zakariya Esma'il
- Education: Cairo University
- Occupation: Judge

Hamida Zakariya Esma'il was the first female judge in South Yemen, Yemen, and the Arab World.

== Education and career ==
Zakariya had a law degree from Cairo University and in 1970 worked at the South Yemen Ministry of Justice as a legal councilor.

In 1971, at the age of 27, Zakaria was appointed as a judge at the Court of Assizes, in Aden. Her appointment made her the first woman judge in the Arab world.

== Personal life ==
Zakariya was married and was a mother. She died prior to 2015.

== See also ==
- Ministry of Justice (Yemen)
- Legal system of Yemen
- Yemeni unification
- Women in Yemen
