= Kasr Al Aini Hospital =

Kasr Al Ainy Hospital
- Cairo University Hospitals
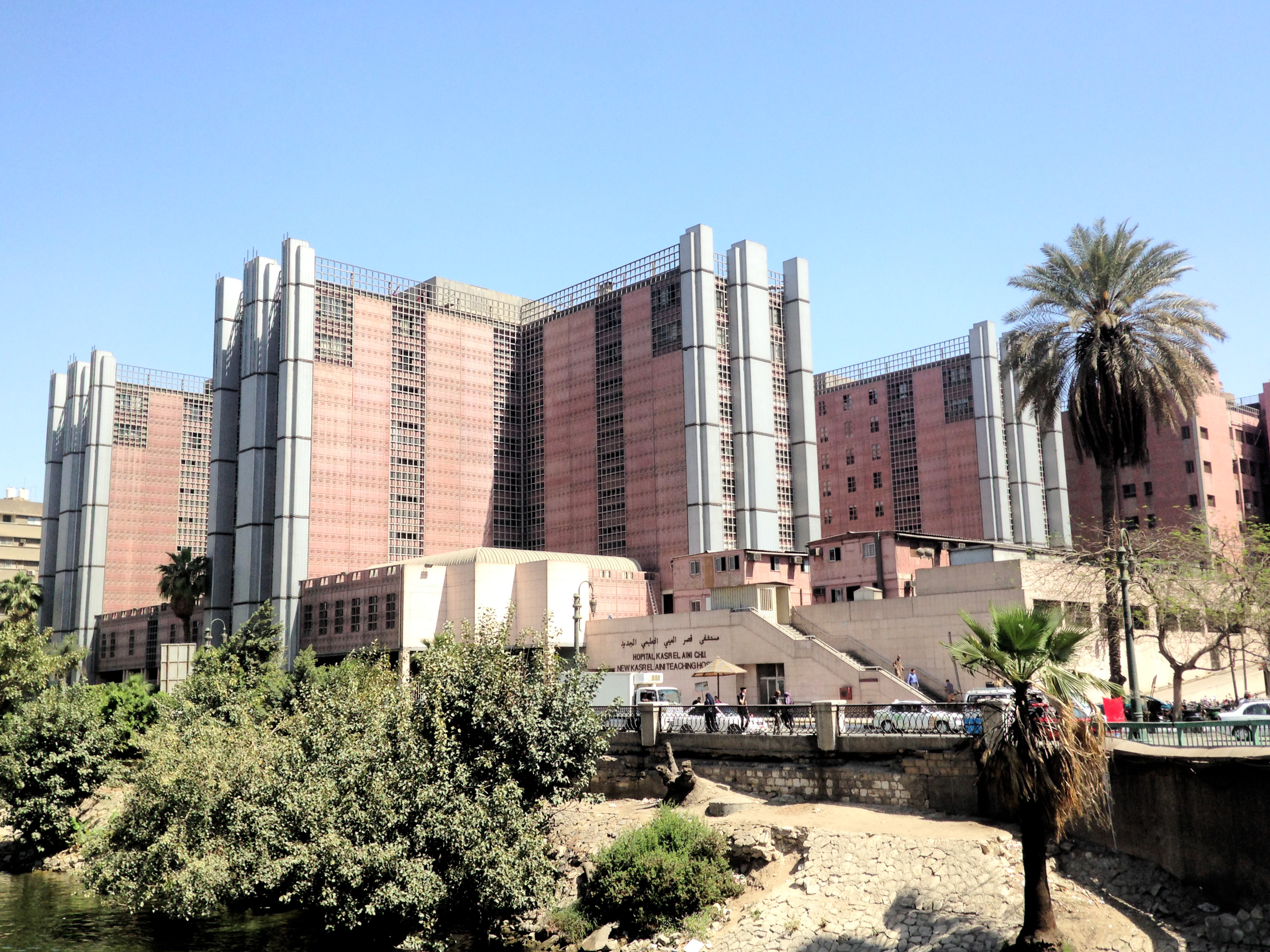
- New Kasr Al Ainy Teaching Hospital

Geography
- Location: Cairo, Egypt
- Coordinates: 30°1′49″N 31°13′46″E

Organisation
- Care system: Ministry of Health and Population (Egypt)
- Type: Teaching
- Affiliated university: Faculty of Medicine, Cairo University.

Services
- Emergency department: Yes
- Beds: 1200

Helipads
- Helipad: No

History
- Founded: 11 March 1827 (in Abu Zaabal)

Links
- Lists: Hospitals in Egypt

Kasr Al Ainy Hospital (Arabic: مستشفى قصر العينى) is a research and teaching hospital in Cairo, Egypt. This hospital is affiliated with the Cairo University Faculty of Medicine. The hospital was founded on March 11, 1827.

== History ==
In 1827, a medical school was established and attached to a military hospital in Abu Zaabal. The French doctor Antoine Clot Bey (Antoine Clot) became the first director of the medical school and hospital.

In 1837, the medical school and hospital were moved to Qasr El Eyni Street in Cairo. The hospital was renamed as "Kasr Al Ainy hospital".

In 1838, The first school for midwifery was established in Kasr Al Ainy Hospital.

In 1848, Clot Bey resigned and went back to France.

In 1850, Abbas I appointed Wilhelm Griesinger as the director.

In 1851, Griesinger's assistant Theodor Bilharz discovered the first known blood flukes, Schistosoma haematobium and Schistosoma mansoni, and with it the disease bilharzia (schistosomiasis).

In 1855, Clot Bey was re-appointed director of medical school and Kasr Al Ainy Hospital.

In 1858, Clot Bey returned to France for health reasons.

In 1925, the medical school and Qasr El Eyni Hospital joined Cairo University. Dr. Welson was appointed as the new director of the hospital.

From 1929 to 1940, Dr. Aly Basha Ebrahim was appointed the Dean of the faculty and the director of the hospital.

In 1980, the Qasr El Eyni hospital was closed and the building was taken down.

In 1984, a contract for building the new Qasr El Eyni Hospital was awarded to a French consortium formed from Sogea Satom (Sogya Company), Eypoty De Franc (Eypoty De Franc Company), and Setec (Set Folky), with Laila Takla of ITD Egypt spearheading the project and leading the effort to secure the contract.

In 1995, the new hospital buildings were completed. The cost of the new hospital was over 800 million F or around £E150 million.

In November 1995, Cairo university started the first employment stage of the new Qasr El Eyni hospital.

On April 8, 1996, former-president Hosni Mubarak and the President of France, Jacques Chirac inaugurated the new Qasr El Eyni hospital building.

== Specialized units and departments ==
- Cardiology department
- Critical Care and Cath labs
- Ophthalmology Department
- Specialized Medical Biochemistry Experimentation Unit
- gastroenterology, hepatology and infectious diseases .
- National Clinical Toxicology Centre
- Microbiology Research Centre
- Diagnosis and Therapy of Bilharzial Liver diseases
- Urosurgery
- Andrology
- Neurosurgery
- Plastic surgery
- General surgery
- Oncosurgery
- Orthopedics and Trauma surgery
- Ear, Nose and Throat
- The Unit of Renal Failure Therapy and Surgery
- T.B. Research Unit
- Measurement Unit for Fitness and Disability for Occupational Diseases
- Tumor Radiological Therapy and Nuclear Medicine Centre
- Tumor Symptoms Test Unit
- Cardiothoracic Surgery
- Audiology
- Neurophysiology Research Unit
- Chromosome Tissue Transplant Research Unit
- Speech and Listening Therapy Unit
- Sleep disorders and Snoring Therapy Unit
- Cochlea Transplant, Ear Lab and Bank Unit
- Epilepsy Therapy Research Unit
- Leprosy Unit
- Ophthalmologic Laser Diagnosis and Therapy
- Pulmonology and pulmonology critical care
- Parasitology Unit
- Diagnostic radiology Unit
- Interventional Radiology Unit
- Abu El-Reesh El-Mounira Children University Hospital
- Abu ElReesh Japanese children University hospital
- Diabetic Children, Endocrinology and Metabolism Care Unit
- Psychiatry and Addiction Hospital
- Neurology Department
- Multiple sclerosis Unit
- Functional and Microscopic E.N.T. Unit
- Nursing Development Research Centre
- Preservation, Redressing and Transplanting of the Tissue of the Motor System Centre
- Manial University Hospital; located fourth floor of Qasr El Eyni Hospital
- Hematology Unit
- Anesthesia, SICU and Pain management
- Allergy and Immunological Problems Unit
- Rheumatology Unit

== Official Specialized Units ==
- Genetics Unit, managed by Prof. Mai Sherif
- Prof. Hesham El Saket Learning Resource Complex (LRC) that includes Learning Resource Center, Main Conference Hall and Staff Cafeteria. Managed by Prof. Mahmoud Elfiky.
- MEDIC, managed by Prof. Essam El Toukhy.
- KARIS, managed by Prof. Tamer Gheita.
- International Relations Office

== Gallery ==
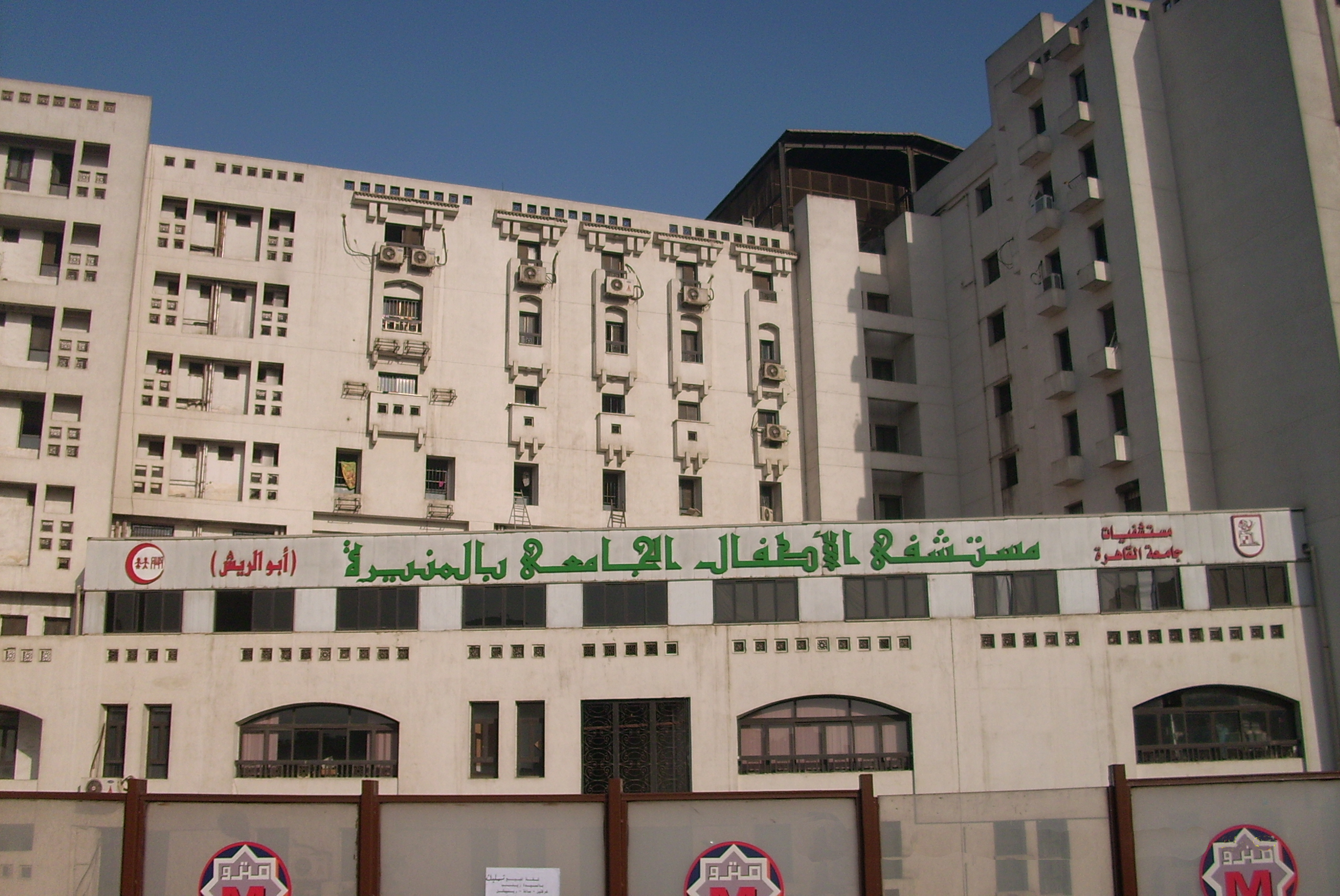
Cairo University - Abu El Resh Pediatric University Hospital

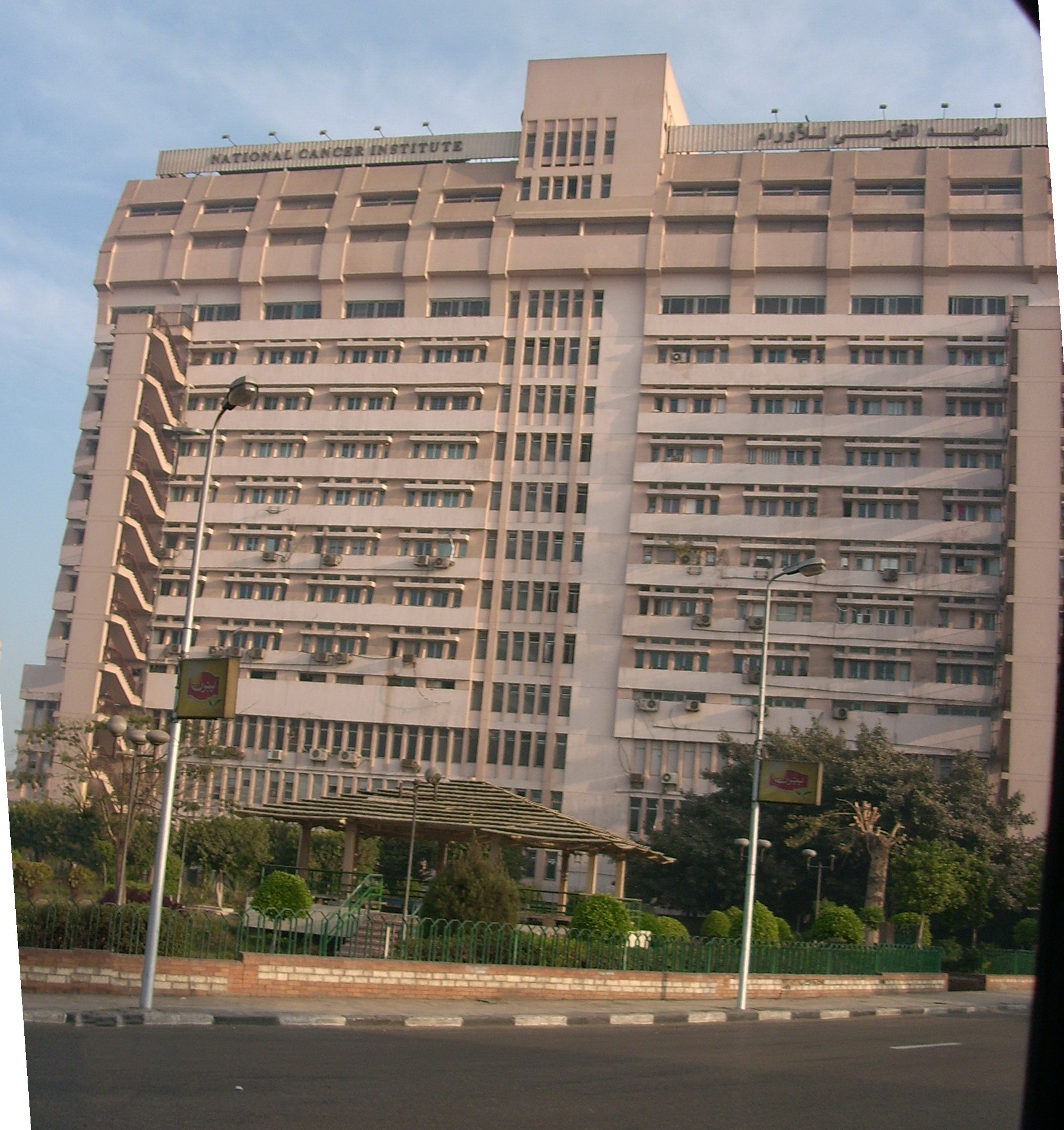
Cairo University - National Cancer Institute

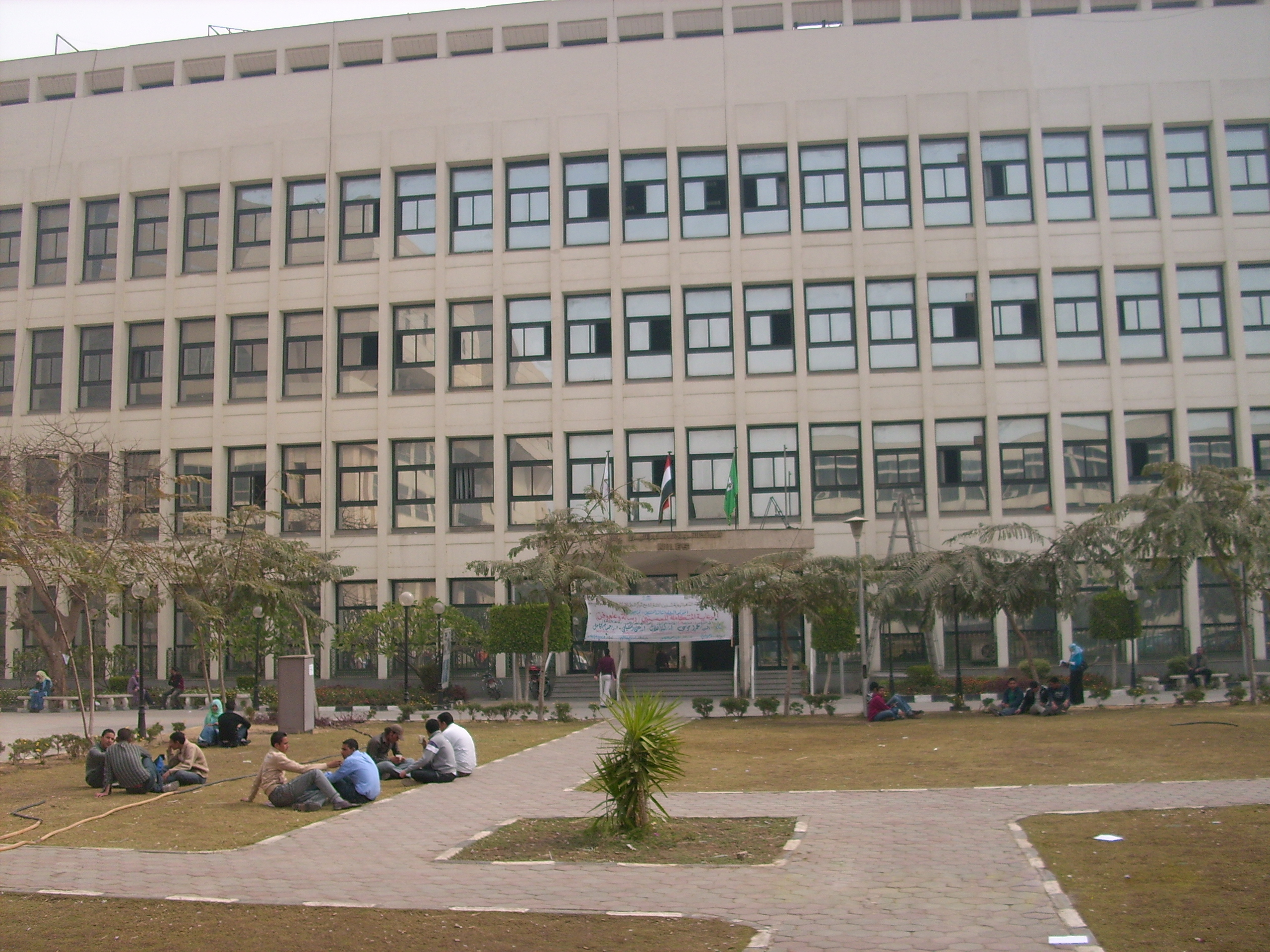
Cairo University - National Laser Institute

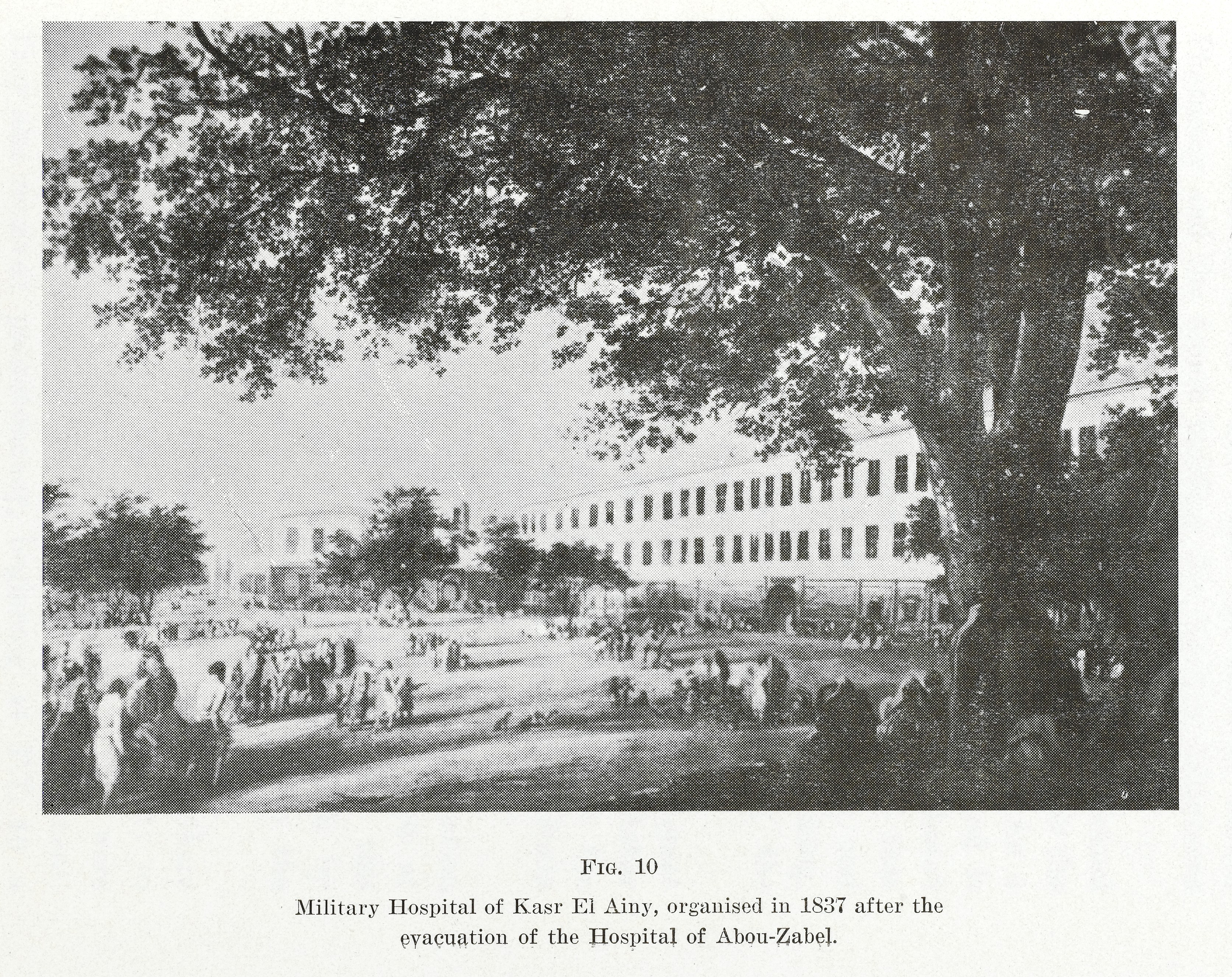
"Military hospital of Kasr El Ainy, organised in 1837 after the evacuation of the hospital of Abou-Zabel." The history of medical education in Egypt (1935). Image from the Wellcome Collection.
