= Qasr El-Eyni Faculty of Medicine, Cairo University =

Medical School in Cairo, Egypt

Kasr Al-Ainy Faculty of Medicine, Cairo University
- كلية طب القصر العيني بجامعة القاهرة
- Type: Faculty
- Established: 1826; 200 years ago (As a School of Medicine); 1925; 101 years ago (As Cairo University's Faculty of Medicine)
- Founder: Antoine Clot
- Parent institution: Cairo University
- Dean: Dr. Husam Salah
- Faculty: 6,376
- Students: 13,854
- Location: Cairo, Cairo Governorate, Egypt; 30.02760°N 31.21014°E
- Campus: Urban
- Mascot: Heka
- Website: medicine.cu.edu.eg (English version)

Kasr Al-Ainy Faculty of Medicine in Cairo University (Arabic: كلية طب جامعة القاهرة ), is the Medical School of Cairo University, in Cairo, Egypt. It was founded on March 11, 1827 as a military hospital and school of medicine. In 1925, the school became a part of Cairo University becoming its faculty of medicine. The faculty has its own hospital, Kasr Al Aini Hospital, which is under the Ministry of Higher Education & Scientific Research.

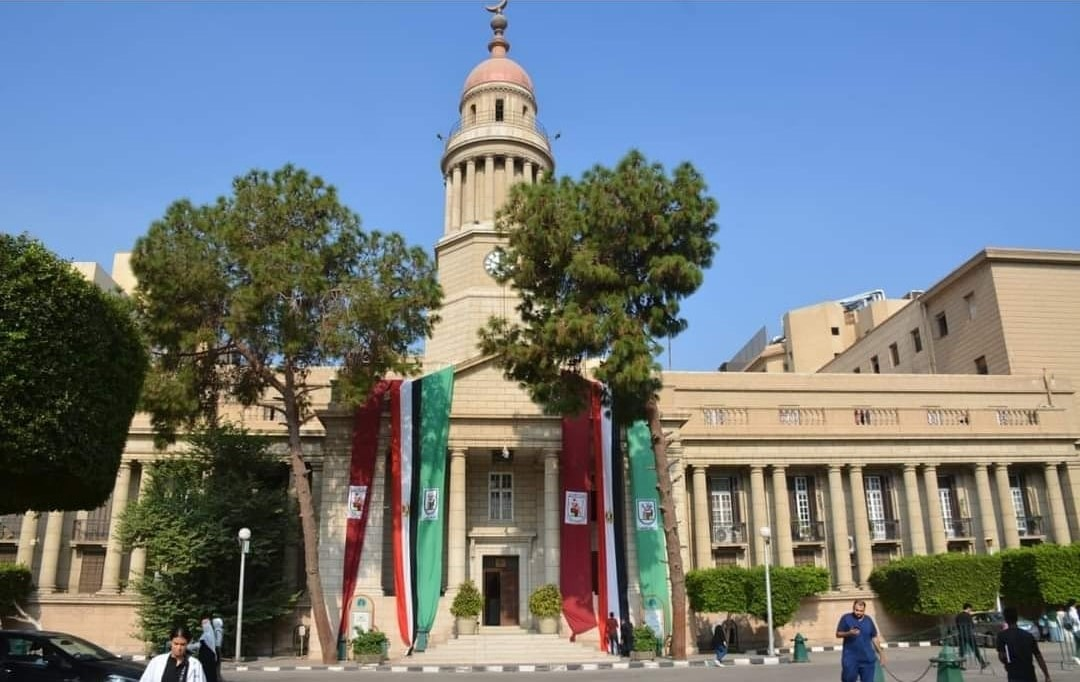
Faculty Campus in Cairo.

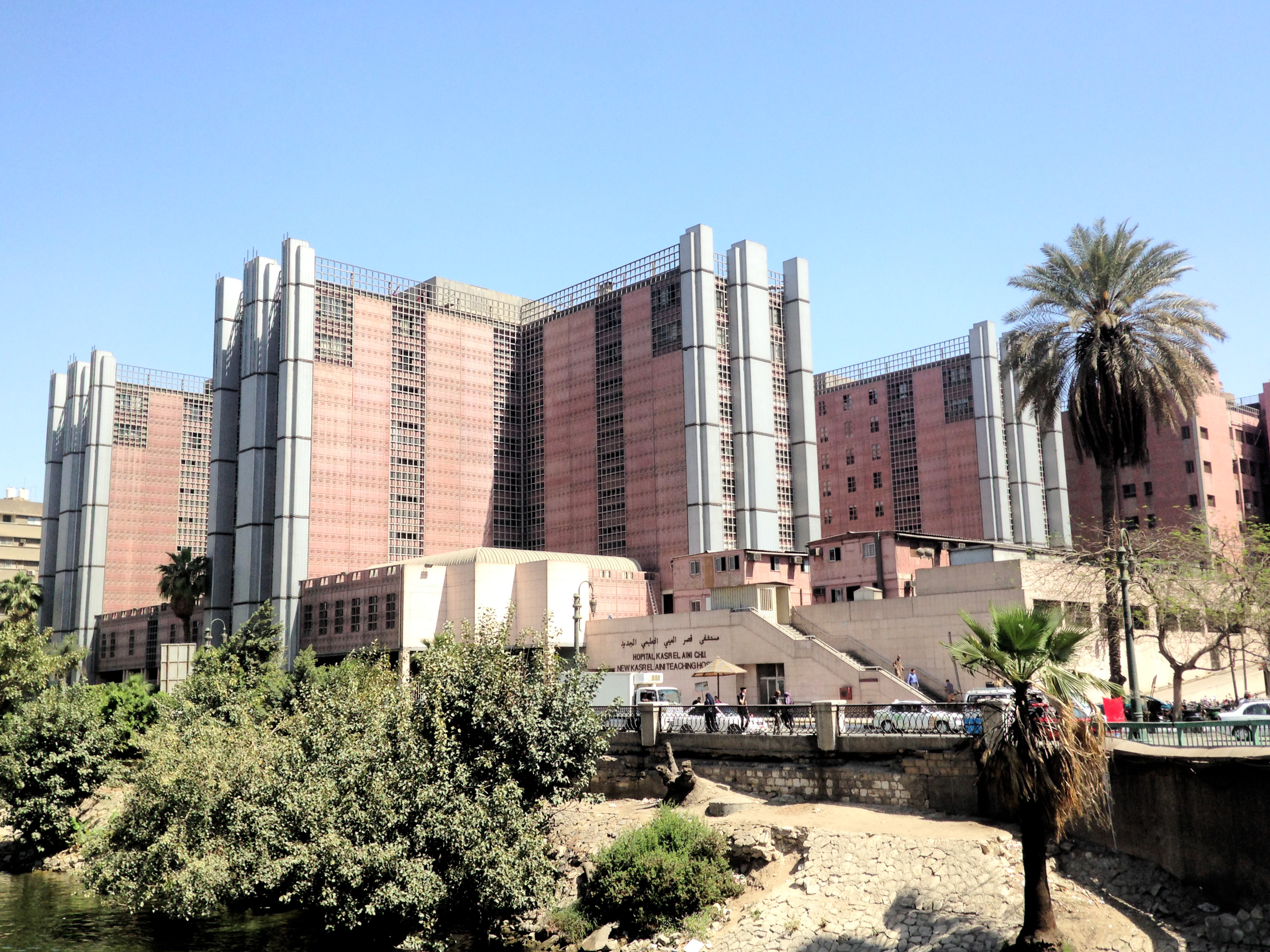
Kasr Al-Ainy teaching hospital.

== History ==
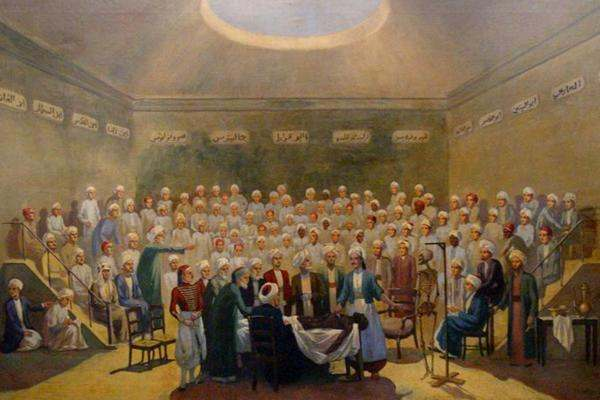
Clot Bey in Egyptian army uniform teaching the first modern Anatomy lesson at Abu-Zaabal, Egypt on 20 June 1829. The lesson was attended by some Shiekhs from al-Azhar.

In 1827, a medical school was established and attached to a military hospital in Abu Zaabal. The French doctor Antoine Clot Bey became the first director of the medical school and hospital. In 1837, the medical school and hospital was moved to Kasr El Eyni Street in Cairo. The hospital was renamed as "Kasr El Eyni hospital". In 1838, The first school for midwifery was established in Kasr El Eyni Hospital. In 1848, Clot Bey resigned and went back to France. In 1850, Abbas I appointed Wilhelm Griesinger as the director. In 1851, Griesinger's assistant Theodor Bilharz discovered the first known blood flukes, Schistosoma haematobium and Schistosoma mansoni, and with it the disease bilharzia (schistosomiasis). In 1855, Clot Bey was re-appointed director of medical school and Kasr El Eyni Hospital. In 1858, Clot Bey returned to France for health reasons.

In 1925, the medical school and Kasr El Eyni Hospital joined Cairo University. Dr. Welson was appointed as the new director of the hospital. From 1929 to 1940, Dr. Aly Basha Ebrahim was appointed the Dean of the faculty and the director of the hospital. In November 1995, Cairo university started the first employment stage of the new Kasr El Eyni hospital. On April 8, 1996, former-president Hosni Mubarak and the President of France, Jacques Chirac inaugurated the new Kasr El Eyni hospital building.

The Faculty Dean is Prof. Husam Salah Mourad, Professor of Neurology since August 2023. He was appointed after serving as the Director of the Cairo University Hospitals.

The Faculty Vice Deans include:

- Prof. Abdel Meguid Kassem, Vice Dean for Research and Postgraduate Studies.
- Prof. Hanan Mubarak, Vice Dean for Student Affairs.
- Prof. Omar Azzam, Vice Dean for Community Affairs.

== Specialized units and departments ==
- Cardiology department
- Critical Care and Cath labs
- Ophthalmology Department
- Specialized Medical Biochemistry Experimentation Unit
- gastroenterology, hepatology and infectious diseases .
- National Clinical Toxicology Centre
- Microbiology Research Centre
- Diagnosis and Therapy of Bilharzial Liver diseases
- Urosurgery
- Andrology
- Neurosurgery
- Plastic surgery
- General surgery
- Oncosurgery
- Orthopedics and Trauma surgery
- Ear, Nose and Throat
- The Unit of Renal Failure Therapy and Surgery
- T.B. Research Unit
- Measurement Unit for Fitness and Disability for Occupational Diseases
- Tumor Radiological Therapy and Nuclear Medicine Centre
- Tumor Symptoms Test Unit
- Cardiothoracic Surgery
- Audiology
- Neurophysiology Research Unit
- Chromosome Tissue Transplant Research Unit
- Speech and Listening Therapy Unit
- Sleep disorders and Snoring Therapy Unit
- Cochlea Transplant, Ear Lab and Bank Unit
- Epilepsy Therapy Research Unit
- Leprosy Unit
- Ophthalmologic Laser Diagnosis and Therapy
- Pulmonology and pulmonology critical care
- Parasitology Unit
- Diagnostic radiology Unit
- Interventional Radiology Unit
- Cairo University Pediatric Hospital (CUPH) a.k.a. Abu El-Reesh El-Mounira Hospital
- Cairo University Specialised Pediatric Hospital (CUSPH) a.k.a. Abu ElReesh Japanese (funded by JICA) Hospital
- Diabetic Children, Endocrinology and Metabolism Care Unit
- Psychiatry and Addiction Hospital
- Neurology Department
- Multiple sclerosis Unit
- Functional and Microscopic E.N.T. Unit
- Nursing Development Research Centre
- Preservation, Redressing and Transplanting of the Tissue of the Motor System Centre
- Manial University Hospital; located fourth floor of Kasr El Eyni Hospital
- Hematology Unit
- Anesthesia, SICU and Pain management
- Allergy and Immunological Problems Unit
- Rheumatology Unit

== Official Specialized Units ==
- Genetics Unit, managed by Prof. Mai Sherif
- Prof. Hesham El Saket Learning Resource Complex (LRC) that includes Learning Resource Center, Main Conference Hall and Staff Cafeteria. Managed by Prof. Mahmoud Elfiky.
- MEDIC.
- KARIS, managed by Prof. Tamer Gheita.
- International Relations Office
