= Harbia Al Himiary =

Yemeni engineer

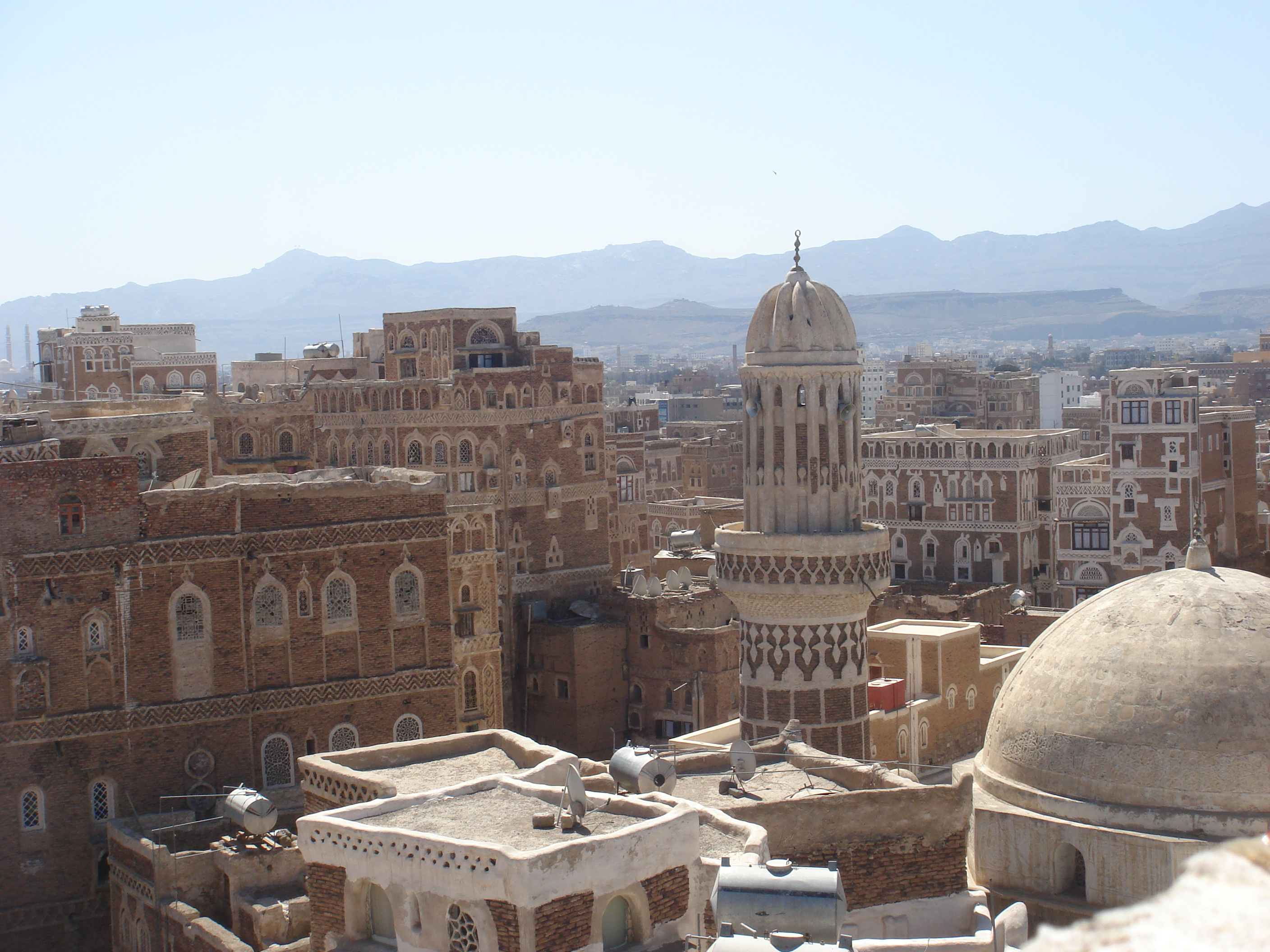
- Born: Circa 1987; Sanaa, Yemen
- Occupation: Heritage Engineer
- Employer: UNESCO
- Known for: Restoring historical cities in Yemen

Harbia Al Himiary is a Yemeni engineer. She is currently leading a United Nations project focused on rebuilding the city of Sanaa, Yemen's capital. She is the first female leader of a construction project in her country.

== Early life and education ==
Al Himiary was born in the city of Sanaa. She had initially gone to university to study medicine, but switched to an engineering degree after two weeks.

== Work with UNESCO ==
The Yemeni Civil War, which began in 2014, has killed thousands of people and displaced more. It has also led to the destruction of many buildings, including those that are of historical interest. Yemen's heritage sites are also threatened by environmental degradation and the economic crisis caused by the war. To preserve and restore Yemen's heritage and history, UNESCO began a cash for work project to restore historic sites across Yemen.

As part of the project, Al Himiary has worked in the old city of Sanaa and the city of Zabid. She has worked on both historic and residential buildings, helping to improve the quality of life of the residents.

This work has included restoring ceilings and replacing rotten beams. It often requires the use of historically accurate materials and building techniques. In many cases this has also required training new workers in engineering and construction techniques, including traditional crafts such as stucco decorations and woodworks. Many of these learners have been girls.

== Recognition ==
Harbia Al Himiary was included in the BBC 100 women list of 2024.
