= Huda Ali Alawi =

Yemeni academic

- Born: 1970/1971

Academic background
- Education: Ain Shams University

Academic work
- Discipline: law
- Institutions: Aden University
- Main interests: human rights

Huda Ali Alawi (born 1970 or 1971) is a Yemeni academic. She is Professor of Criminal Law in the Faculty of Law at Aden University, and Director of the Women Research and Training Center at the university. A leading member of human rights organizations in the Arab world, she has published studies in Lebanon, Egypt and Tunisia.

== Life ==
Alawi grew up in South Yemen, which was an independent state until its unification with North Yemen in 1990. She gained a PhD in criminal law from Ain Shams University in Cairo. In 2010, as deputy director of the Women Research and Training Center at Aden University, she led the centre's delegation to observe the presidential and general elections scheduled to take place in April 2010.

In a 2022 interview with Agence France-Presse, Alawi emphasised that the Yemeni Civil War had "cast a shadow" over women. Studies on gender-based violence in Yemen, in particular, showed an increase since war broke out. "Yemen has regressed in all aspects, and more so when it comes to women empowerment."

== Works ==
- 'Reflections on Women's Rights in Yemen: Opportunities and Challenges', in Rainer Grote and Tilmann J. Röder, eds., Constitutionalism, Human Rights, and Islam after the Arab Spring, Oxford University Press, 2016.
