= Antoine Clot =

French medical doctor known as Clot Bey while practicing in Egypt

Antoine Clot Bey
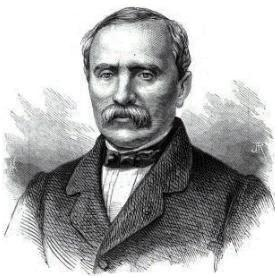
- Antoine Clot on an illustration from 1868
- Born: Antoine Barthelemy Clot; 7 November 1793; Grenoble
- Died: 28 August 1868 (aged 74); Marseille
- Other name: Clot Bey
- Occupation: doctor

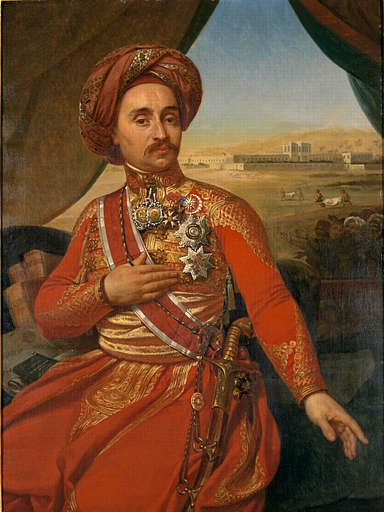
Portrait of Clot in Egyptian Army uniform

Antoine Barthelemy Clot (7 November 1793 – 28 August 1868) was a French medical doctor known as Clot Bey while practicing in Egypt.

== Early life and education ==
He was born at Grenoble. In 1823, he graduated in medicine and surgery at Montpellier. His thesis for Doctor of Surgery was entitled Dangers of the Instrumental Manipulation in Obstetrical Delivery.

== Efforts in Egypt ==
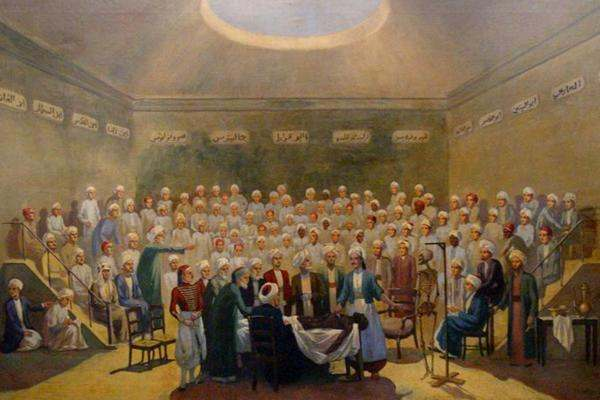
Clot in Egyptian army uniform teaching the first modern Anatomy lesson at Abu-Zaabal on 20 June 1829. The lesson was attended by some Sheikhs from al-Azhar.

During the French occupation of Egypt, Napoleon designated Kasr al-Aini a hospital for his troops in 1799, and then afterwards proposed the opening of a school to teach local Egyptian students the medicine required to treat the troops. This is how, after practicing for a time at Marseille, Clot was invited by Muhammad Ali, Viceroy of Egypt to direct the Kasr al-Aini (Qasral-‘Ayni) School of Medicine at the Army hospital of Abou Zabel which later transferred to Cairo.

The Viceroy of Egypt was determined to keep his army in good health and had sent emissaries to recruit doctors in Europe. On 24 January 1825, Clot sailed for Cairo on the Bonne Emilie with 20 other European doctors destined to assist him. Clot arrived in Egypt with the title of Surgeon-in-Chief of the Armies. As there was no medical care system in Egypt at that time, he began by instituting French Army regulations for the Egyptian army camps.

The Army Medical School had a difficult beginning with religious officials set against dissection of corpses for anatomy lessons, but this was the foundation for modern medicine in Egypt. In order to break down resistance to the idea of dissection he first suggested using dogs, not even one belonging to a Muslim but one belonging to a Christian or a Jew. He next progressed to suggesting the use of stray bones and skulls found scattered around an out of town cemetery reasoning "what harm if we get a few of these skulls and bones for the sake of explanation to you; they may as well lie upon my table, as to lay bleaching in the sun." Finally, to obtain acquiescence to the dissection of dead bodies he appealed to local prejudices by arguing "we will not take a free white man, but a black slave."

Clot was made chief surgeon to Muhammad Ali Pasha, viceroy of Egypt, at Abu Zabal, near Cairo. He shaped the Kasr El Aini Hospital and schools for all branches of medical instruction, as well as facilities for the study of the French language; and, notwithstanding the most serious religious difficulties, instituted the study of anatomy by means of dissection.

In 1832, Muhammad Ali allowed Clot to establish a School of Medicine for women; In the same year, Muhammad Ali gave him the distinction of bey without requiring him to abjure his religion. In 1836 he received the rank of general, and was appointed head of medical administration for the entire country.

== Return to France ==
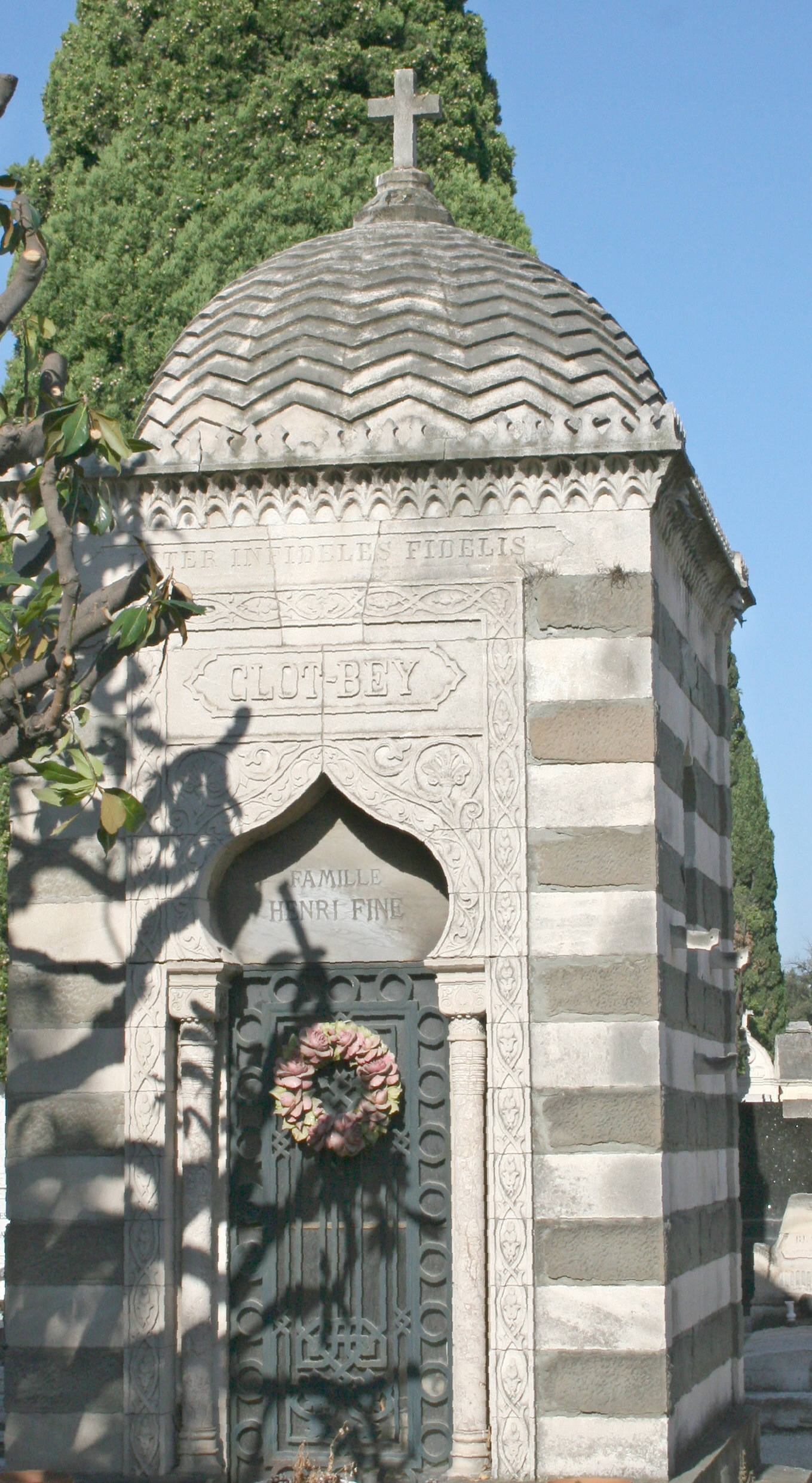
Tomb of Clot-bey at Marseille, France

In 1849 he returned to Marseille, though he revisited Egypt in 1856. He died in Marseille in 1868, aged 74.

== Publications ==
- Relation des épidémies de choléra qui ont régné de l'Heggaz, à Suez, et en Égypte (1832)
- De La Peste observée en Égypte (1840)
- Aperçu général sur l'Égypte (1840)
- Coup d'oeil sur la peste et les quarantaines (1851)
- De l'ophthalmie (1864)
- Leçon sur la peste d'Égypte
- Mémoires de A.-B. Clot Bey (ed Jacques Tagher) (1949)

== Legacy ==
A street in his hometown of Grenoble and a street in Marseille where he studied and lived were named after him.

A street in down town Cairo was named after him.

Many statues of him are present at Kasr El Aini Hospital and in its museum.

The thick-billed lark (Rhamphocoris clotbey), a North African and Middle Eastern desert bird, was named in Clot's honour by naturalist Charles Lucien Bonaparte.
