= Cairo University =

Public university in Giza, Egypt

- Egyptian Arabic: جامعة القاهرة, romanized: Gamʿet el-Qāhira
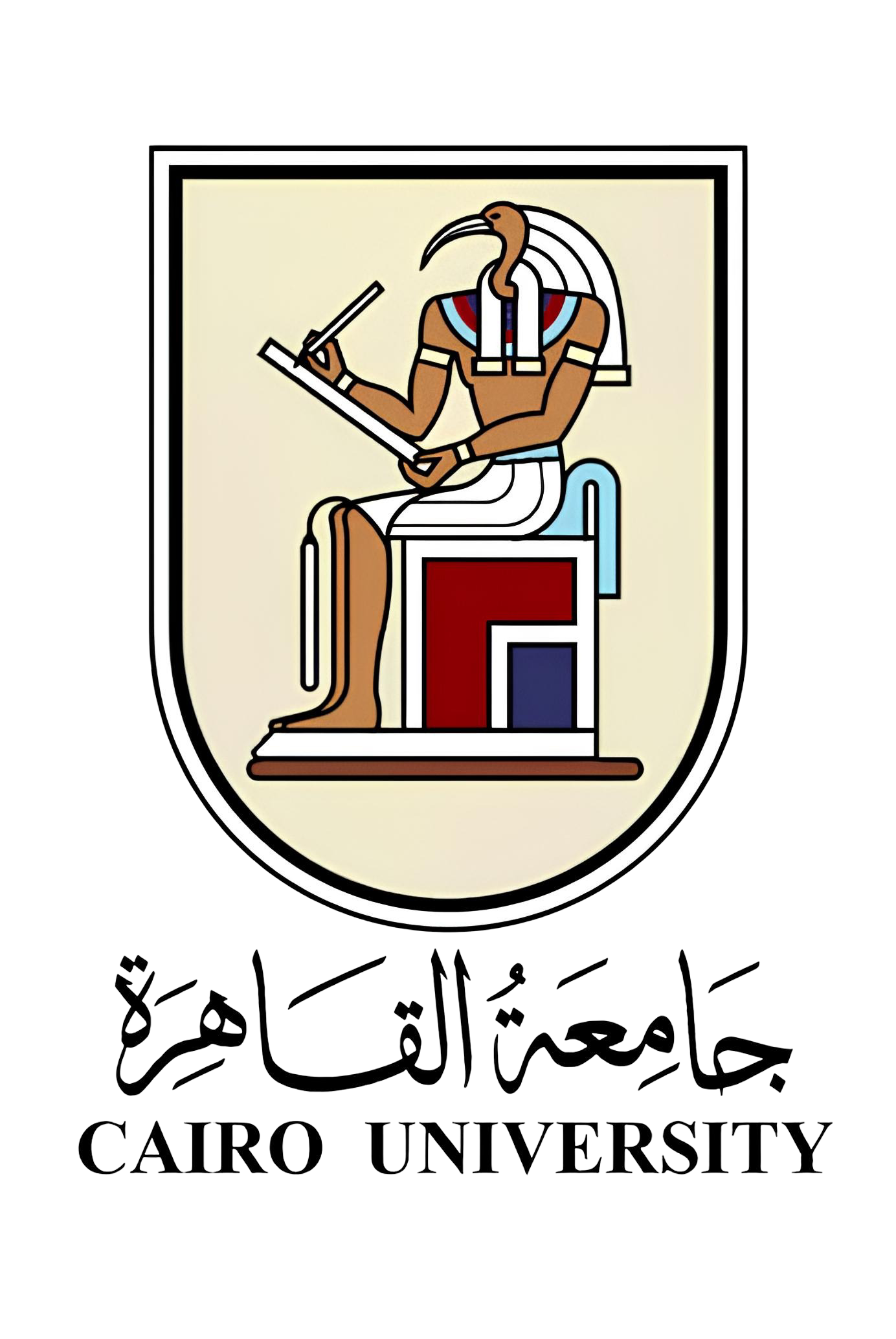
- Latin: Universitas Cairensis
- Former names: Egyptian University (1908–1940); Fuad I University (1940–1954)
- Motto: منارة العلم، منطلق الابتكار
- Motto in English: Beacon of Knowledge, Launchpad of Innovation.
- Type: Public
- Established: 21 December 1908; 117 years ago
- Founders: Fuad I (Most prominent)
- Academic affiliations: UNIMED; AAU; AUF
- President: Mohamed Samy Abdel-Sadak
- Faculty: 14,518+ (2024)
- Students: 207,853+ (2024)
- Location: Giza, Giza Governorate, Egypt; 30.02760°N 31.21014°E
- Campus: Urban
- International Students: 6,963+ (2024)
- Mascot: Thoth
- Website: Official website (English version)

Cairo University is a public university in Giza, Egypt. Founded on 21 December 1908, the university is the second oldest institution of higher education in Egypt after Al-Azhar University, notwithstanding the pre-existing higher professional schools that later became constituent colleges of the university.

The university was known as the Egyptian University from 1908 to 1940, and King Fuad I University and Fu'ād al-Awwal University from 1940 to 1952. The main campus is in Giza, immediately across the Nile from Cairo. After being housed in various parts of Cairo, its faculties, beginning with the Faculty of Arts, were established on its current main campus in Giza in October 1929.

The university was founded and funded as the Egyptian University by a committee of private citizens with royal patronage in 1908 and became a state institution under King Fuad I in 1925. In 1940, four years following his death, the university was renamed King Fuad I University in his honor. It was renamed a second time after the 1952 Egyptian revolution. The university currently enrolls approximately 155,000 students in 20 faculties and 3 institutions. It counts three Nobel Laureates among its graduates and is one of the 50 largest institutions of higher education in the world by enrollment.

== History ==
Before he retired in 1907, the British representative in Egypt, Lord Cromer, was opposed to establishing a higher education institution in the country for fear that it would foment unrest. The university opened as a small private institution in 1908. Its early founding and location made it a model for later universities throughout the Arab world. It was taken over as a state university in 1925 and became Cairo University in 1954.

The university was founded on 21 December 1908, as the result of an effort to establish a national center for higher education. Several constituent colleges preceded the establishment of the university including the College of Engineering (كلية الهندسة) in 1816, which was shut down by the Khedive of Egypt and Sudan, Sa'id Pasha, in 1854. Cairo University was founded as a European-inspired civil university, in contrast to the religious university of Al Azhar, and became the prime indigenous model for other state universities. In 1928, the first group of female students enrolled at the university.

On 27 January 2020, Egypt's High Administrative Court approved Cairo University's decision to ban its professors from wearing the niqab or face veil which was introduced in 2015.

== Foundation ==
At the turn of the century, Egyptian intellectuals and public figures began making calls to establish an Egyptian institute of higher education to provide a modern, professional education to Egyptians. Armenian bureaucrat Yaqub Artin made the first known published reference to establishing an Egyptian university in 1894. In a report, he suggested "the existing higher professional schools could well provide the basis for a university." These higher schools included the School of Management and Languages, established in 1868 (which became the School of Law in 1886), the School of Irrigation and Construction (known as the School of Engineering) in 1866, Dar al-Ulum in 1872, the School of Agriculture in 1867 and the School of Antiquities 1869.

Syrian journalist Jurji Zaydan called for an "Egyptian college school" (madrasa kulliya misriyya) in 1900 in his monthly magazine Al-Hilal. He provided two models for this institute of higher education: the Muhammadan Anglo-Oriental College at Aligarh, India, which delivered a Western-style education in the English language, or the Syrian Protestant College (now the American University of Beirut) in Beirut, run by American missionaries. The new school would provide an alternative to the student missions to Europe begun under Muhammad Ali. Controversy surrounding Zaydan's publications would later prevent him from taking a teaching post at the university. A number of other prominent Egyptians played a role in the university's foundation. A collection of large landowners, bureaucrats, members of the royal family, and journalists, lawyers, and school teachers including Mustafa Kamil, disciples of Muhammad Abduh such as Qasim Amin and Saad Zaghlul, and eventually Khedive Abbas II and Prince Ahmad Fu’ad I became involved. As Donald M. Reid writes, "Royalist partisans stressed Fu'ad's founding role, Watanists (supporters of the National Party) pointed out Mustafa Kamil's call for a university, and Wafdists emphasized the contributions of Saad Zaghlul, Muhammad Abduh, and Qasim Amin."

Wealthy Egyptians began to independently pledge funds to the establishment of a university as early as 1905. Significant contributions were made by Princess Fatma Ismail. In the early 1900s, she donated land to the university as a part of her fundraising campaign for the establishment of Egypt's first formal university. Following the Denshawai incident, Mustafa Kamil al-Ghamrawi, a wealthy notable from Beni Suef, pledged 500 Egyptian pounds towards a university in September 1906. Mustafa Kamil published a call for supplementary funds, while Saad Zaghlul and Qasim Amin arranged a meeting attended by Muhammad Farid and 23 other prominent Egyptians. The members of the meeting founded a committee with Zaghlul as vice-president and Amin as secretary, and all but three pledged at least 100 Egyptian pounds towards the university. However, splinters quickly emerged between the Watanists, the disciples of Abduh and the Royalists, leaving the project in the hands of the Palace. By the time of its establishment in 1908, Prince Fuad I was the rector, and only one of the men who had met in 1906 remained on the committee.

Concerning the faculty of engineering In 2006, the college began implementing the credit hour system by launching the following programs: construction engineering, computer and telecommunications engineering.

In 2007 programs that were developed: mechanical design engineering, architecture engineering and construction technology and petrochemical engineering.

In 2008, it introduced a program: Construction Engineering.

In 2009, it introduced the Water and Environmental Engineering Program.

== Challenges to foundation ==
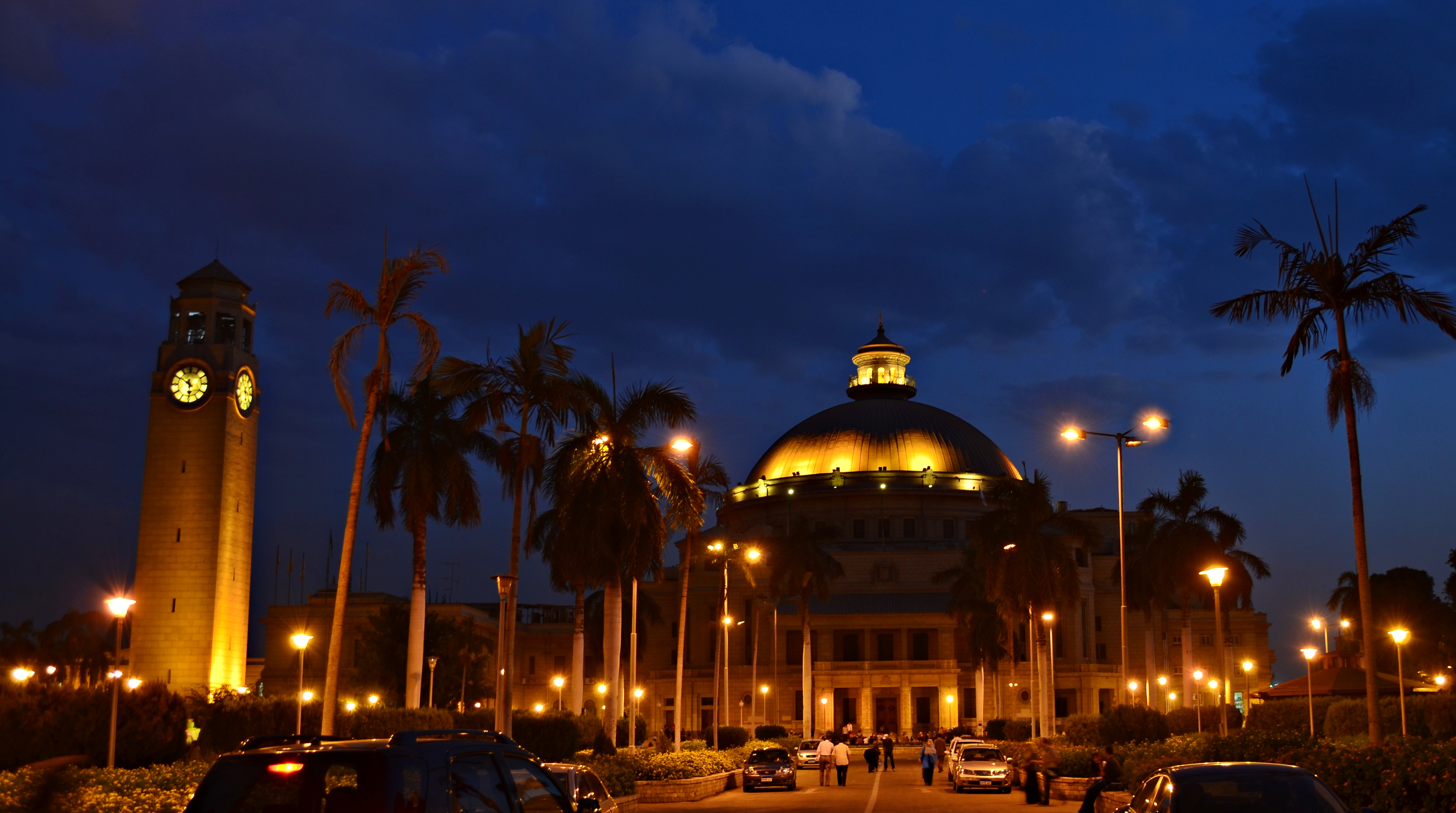
Cairo University after sunset

The British colonial government, particularly Lord Cromer, had long opposed the establishment of such a university. Only a year after his departure from Egypt, under Sir Eldon Gorst, was the Egyptian University finally established. The Egyptian educational system remained neglected by the colonial government under the direction of Lord Cromer. Two decades after the establishment of British rule, education received less than 1 percent of the state budget. Cromer publicly stated that free public education was not an appropriate policy for a nation such as Egypt, although the funds were found to refurbish the law school in Cairo so Egyptians did not have to go abroad to obtain legal degrees during Sir John Scott's time as Judicial Advisor to the Khedive. Donald M. Reid speculates that this was due to fear that European-style education would foment political unrest or nationalistic sentiments. Cromer also opposed providing financial aid to the university after the private committee began to pursue the matter independently of the colonial government.

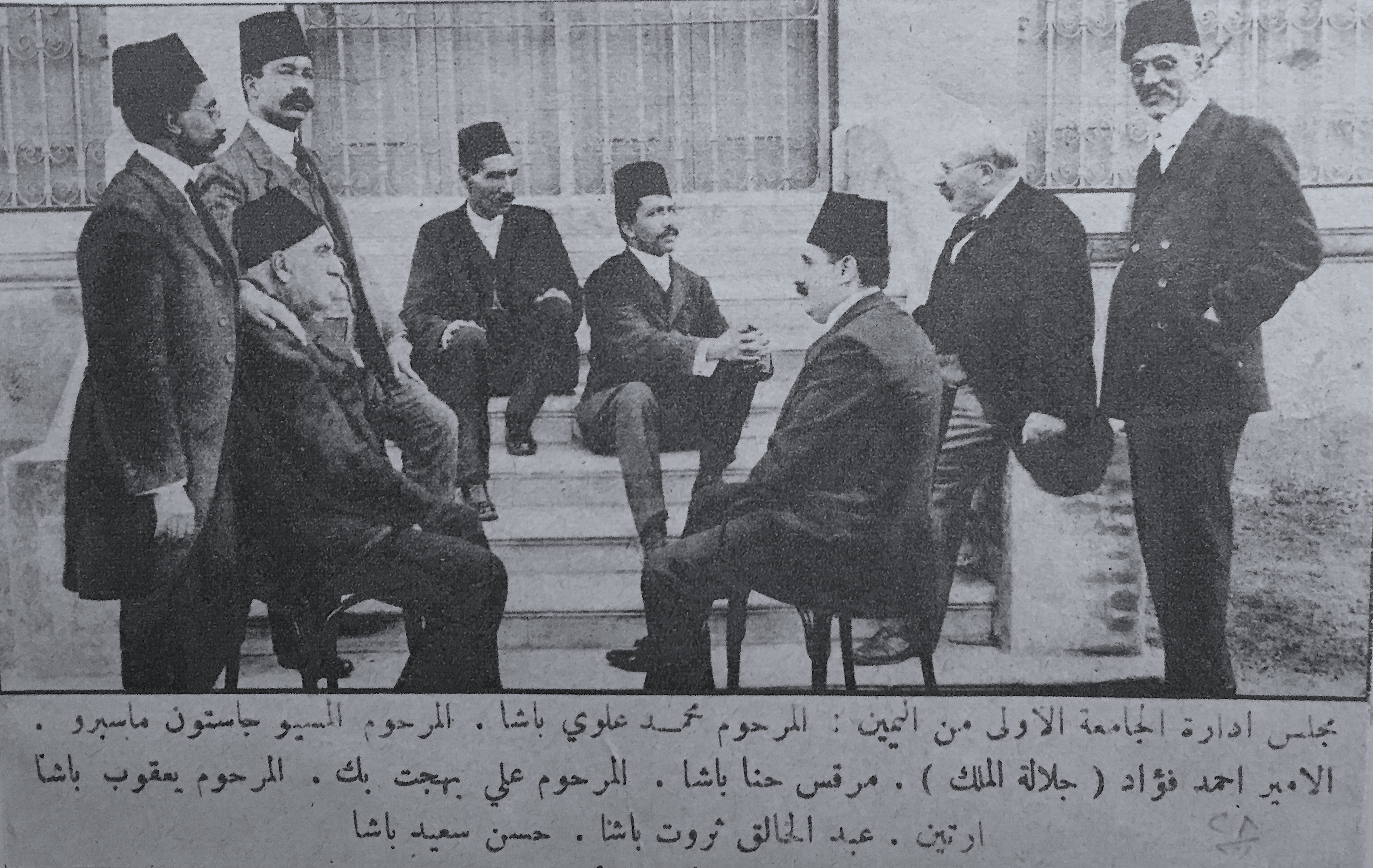
The first Board of the Egyptian University in 1908

In its early years, the university did not have a campus but rather advertised lectures in the press. Lectures would be held in various palaces and conference halls. After a grand opening ceremony in 1908, it remained on financial insecure footing for a number of years, nearly collapsing during World War I. Upon its founding in 1908, the Egyptian University had a women's section but this was closed in 1912. Women were first readmitted to the arts faculty in 1928.

Problems during this period also included a lack of professional faculty to fulfill the founders' educational vision. There were simply no Egyptians with doctoral degrees, the ability to teach in Arabic and a familiarity with Western literature in their fields with whom to fill professorial posts. Thus European Orientalists who lectured in classical Arabic filled many posts until the 1930s. The university also sent its own students on educational missions to obtain the necessary training. First, the university hired Italians Carlo Nallino, David Santillana and Ignazio Guidi, due to King Fuad I's connections with Italy. Following the departure of the Italians after the invasion of Libya, French orientalists Gaston Wiet and Louis Massignon took up posts on the faculty. The Germans and British were less represented.

In 1925, the university was re-founded and expanded as a state institution under Fuad I. The liberal arts college (kulliyat al-adab) of 1908 was joined with the schools of law and medicine, and a new faculty of science was added. Ahmed Lutfi al-Sayyid became the first president.

== Ranking ==
University rankings

Global – Overall
- ARWU World: 301–400 (2023)
- CWUR World: 531 (2022-23)
- CWTS World: 294 (2022)
- QS World: =347 (2026)
- THE World: 801–1000 (2024)
- USNWR Global: =392 (2022)

National – Overall
- ARWU National: 1 (2021)
- CWTS National: 1 (2022)
- CWUR National: 1 (2022–2023)
- QS National: 2 (2023)
- USNWR National: 1 (2022)

Cairo University is usually ranked among the best universities in Egypt, and one of the top universities in Africa.

In QS ranking 2021, Cairo University was ranked the 2nd in Egypt and the 6th across Africa, and it was rated 561-570 worldwide.

In the ARWU 2020 ranking, the university was ranked 1st in Egypt. It was rated 401-500 worldwide.

According to the Center for World University Rankings (CWUR) 2020–21, the university was ranked 1st in Egypt, and the 558th worldwide.

== Structure ==
Cairo University includes a School of Law and a School of Medicine. The Medical School, also known as Kasr Alaini (القصر العيني, Qasr-el-'Ayni), was one of the first medical schools in Africa and the Middle East. Its first building was donated by Alaini Pasha. It has since undergone extensive expansion. The first president of Cairo University, then known as the Egyptian University, was Professor Ahmed Lutfi el-Sayed, who served from 1925 to 1941.

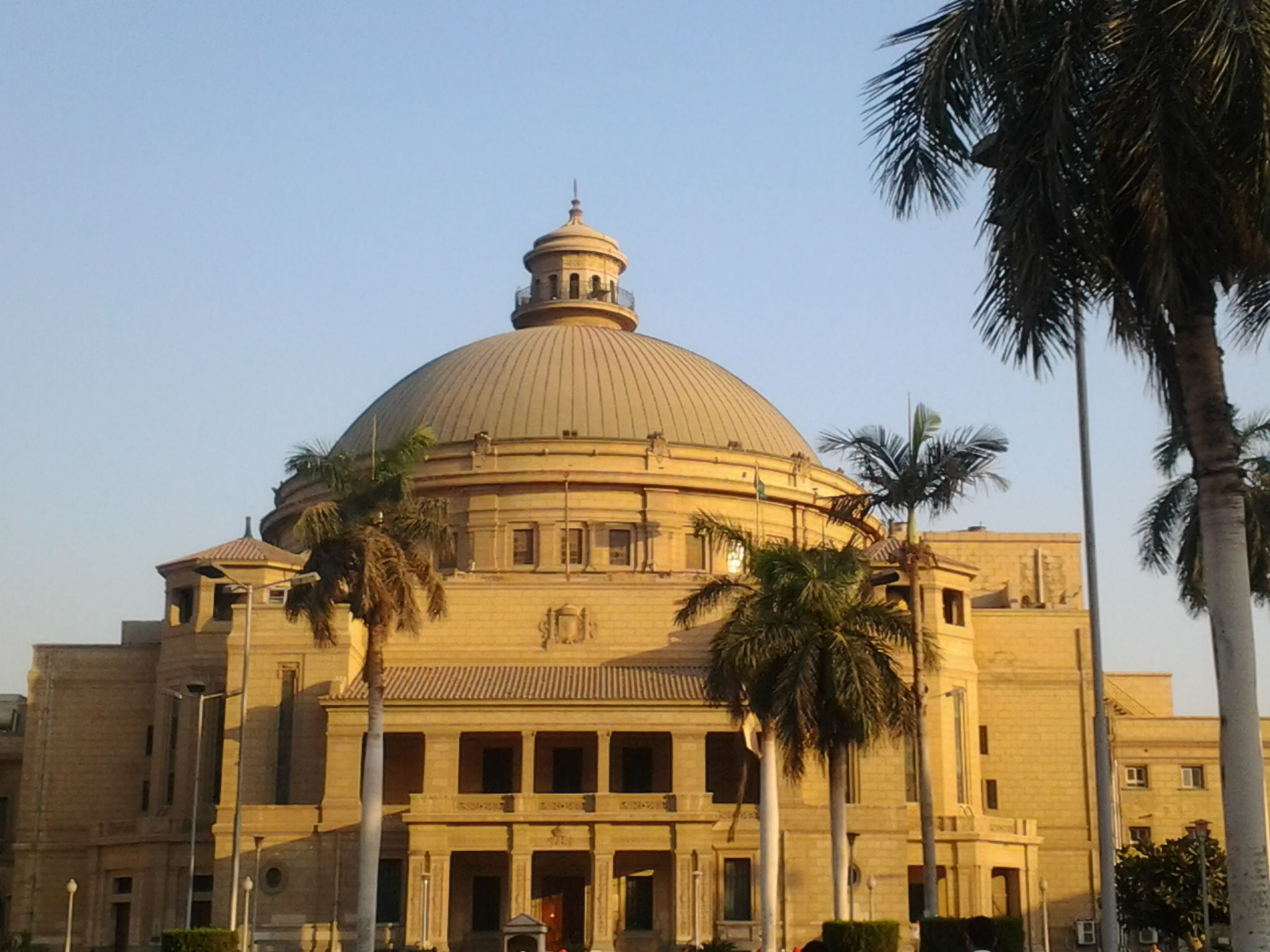
Cairo University Dome in the university's main campus in Giza.

After the Egyptian University's establishment in 1908, all Institutions of higher education that were in Egypt at the time became a part of the university (except Al-Azhar), like Kasr Alainy (Medical School), Muhandess Khana (School of Engineering), Dar Al-Uloom (House of Science) and others that were established by Muhammad Ali Pasha. They became Faculties of the university after joining (e.g. the Faculty of Medicine or Faculty of Engineering). Other Faculties were later founded by the university after the eight schools joined.

	School	Est.
1	School of Engineering	1816
2	School of Medicine	1827
3	School of Pharmacy	1829
4	School of Veterinary Medicine	1827
5	School of Agriculture	1823
6	School of Law	1868
7	Dar Al-Uloom (House of Science)	1872
8	School of Commerce	1837

== Notable alumni ==
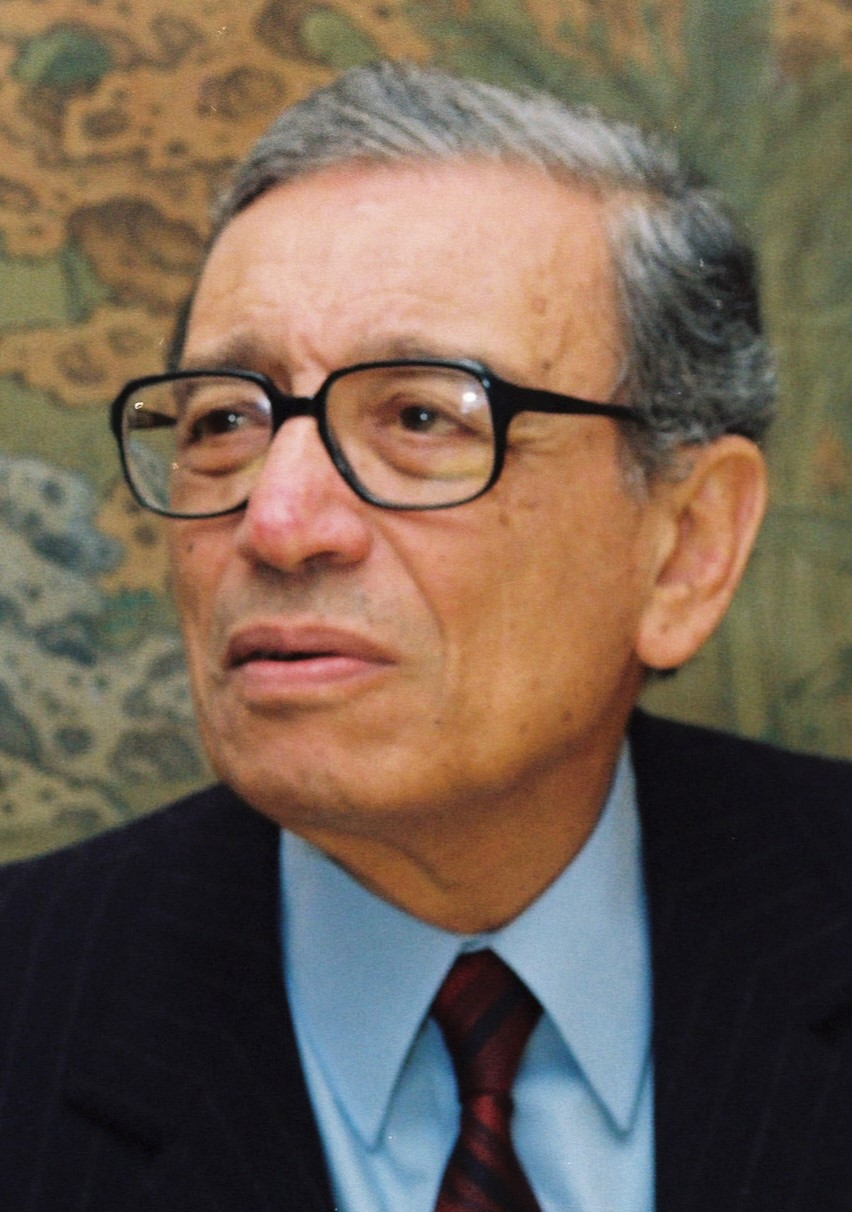
Boutros Boutros-Ghali, 1922

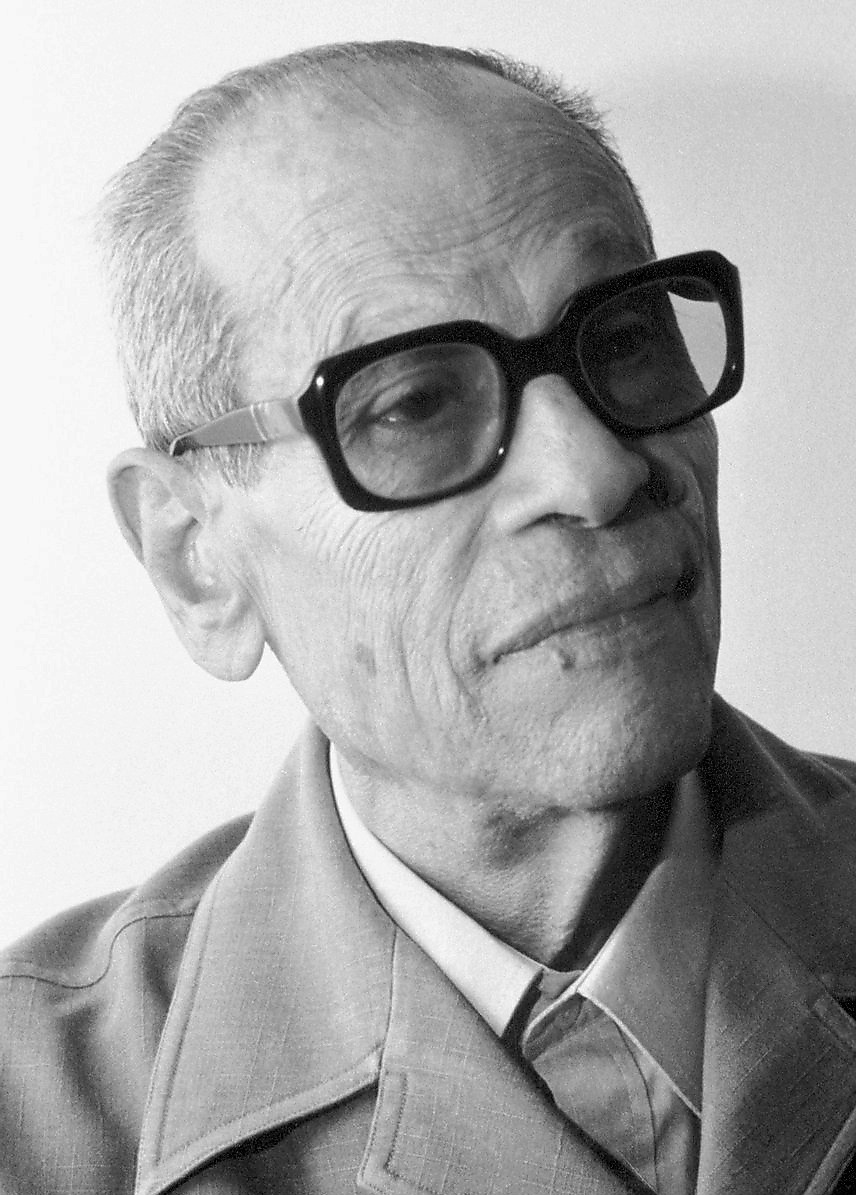
Naguib Mahfouz, 1934

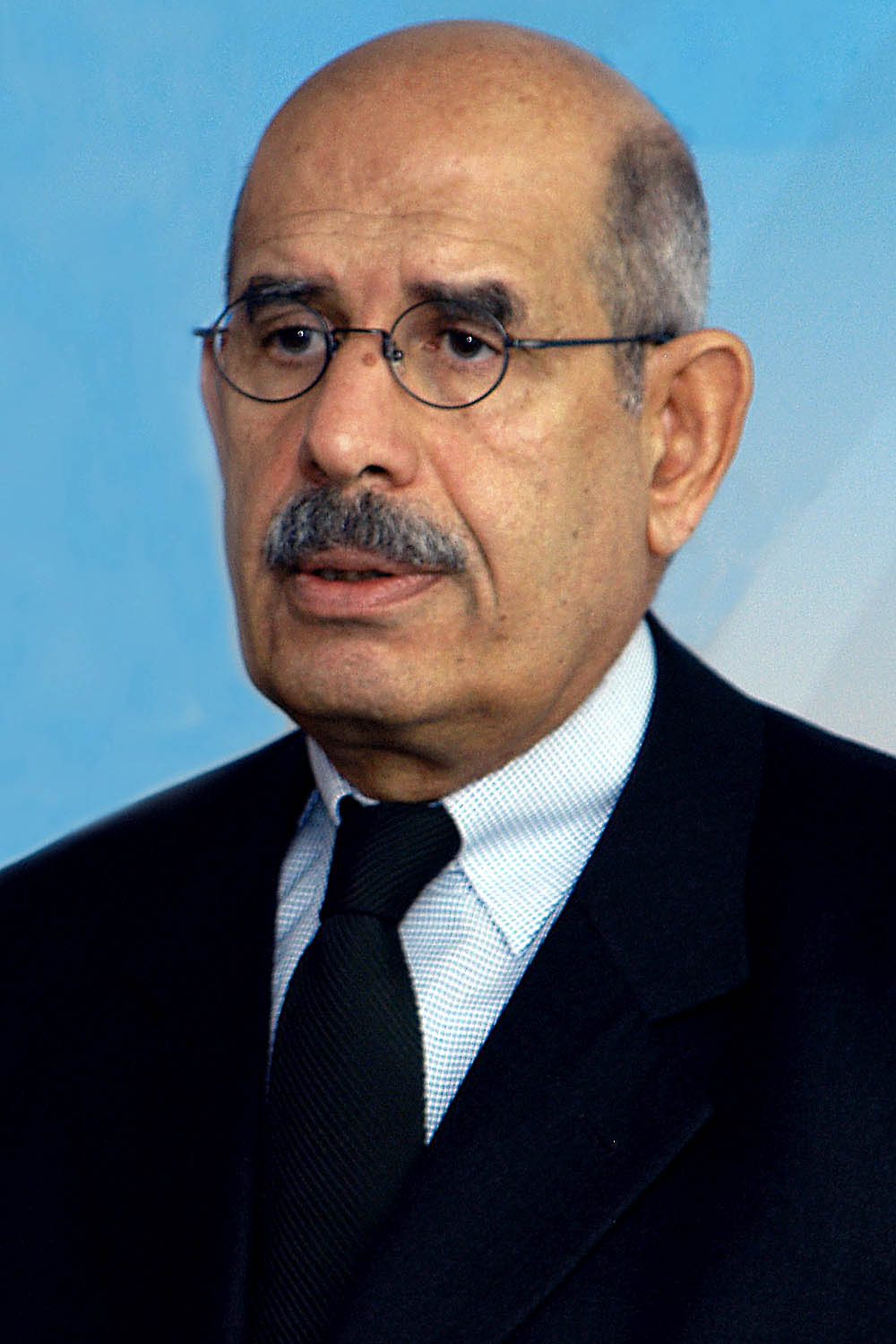
Mohamed ElBaradei, 1962

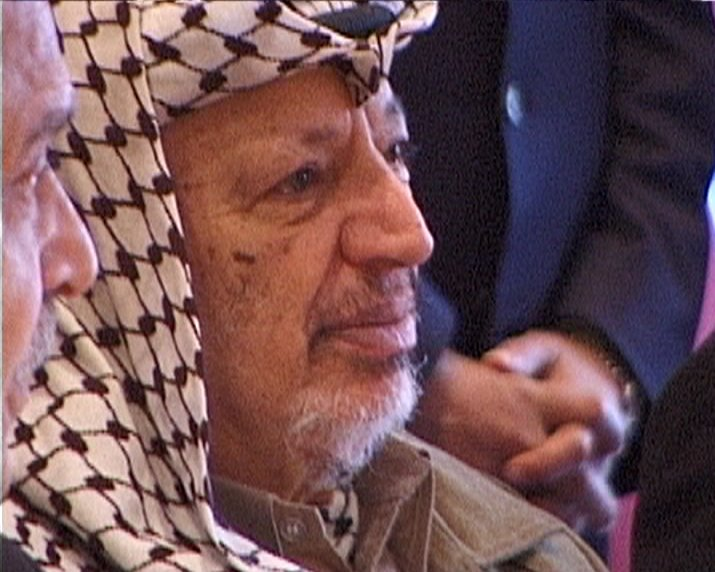
Yasser Arafat, 1956

- Abdel Khalek Sarwat Pasha (1873–1928), twice Prime Minister of Egypt.
- Husayn Fawzi Alnajjar, historian, political scientist, and strategist
- Said Ashour, professor of history
- Mohamed Atalla, engineer, inventor of MOSFET (MOS field-effect transistor), pioneer in silicon semiconductors and security systems, founder of Atalla Corporation
- Mohamed Atta, 9/11 ringleader and hijacker
- Naima Ilyas al-Ayyubi, first female lawyer in Egypt
- Gamal Aziz, also known as Gamal Mohammed Abdelaziz, Egyptian former president and chief operating officer of Wynn Resorts, and former CEO of MGM Resorts International, indicted as part of the 2019 college admissions bribery scandal
- Mona Zulficar, Egyptian attorney at law and human rights activist
- Hisham Barakat, assassinated Prosecutor General of Egypt
- Boutros Boutros-Ghali, sixth Secretary-General of the United Nations (UN) 1992–1996
- Bassem Youssef, Egyptian comedian and former host of satirical show El Bernameg
- Eli Cohen, Israeli Mossad spy that infiltrated the highest echelons of Syrian Government and instrumental in Israeli success in the Six-Day War and other successes
- Taher Elgamal, designer of the ElGamal encryption system and considered "Father of SSL"
- Wael Ghonim, Egyptian activist and figure of the Egyptian Revolution of 2011
- Basma Hassan (born 1976), actress
- Saddam Hussein (1937–2006), former president of Iraq
- Mahmoud Zulfikar (1914–1970), Egyptian filmmaker
- Yuriko Koike (born 1952), former Japanese Minister of Defense and first female governor of Tokyo
- Heba Kotb (born 1967), Egyptian sex therapist and TV host
- Adly Mansour, Interim President of Egypt, and Chief Justice of the Supreme Constitutional Court of Egypt
- Mohamed Morsi (1951–2019), deposed President of Egypt
- Amr Moussa, Secretary-General of the Arab League 2001–2011, and president of the Egyptian constitution amendment committee in 2013
- Shawqi Daif, Arabic literary critic and historian
- Omar Sharif (1932–2015), actor, nominated for an Academy Award and has won three Golden Globe Awards
- Magdi Yacoub (born 1935), professor of cardiothoracic surgery at Imperial College London
- Dina Zulfikar (born 1962), Egyptian environmentalist
- Mohamed Shaker El-Markabi, Minister of Electricity and Renewable Energy
- Ayman al-Zawahiri (1951–2022), a terrorist, former practicing surgeon in the Egyptian Army, leader of the terrorist organisation al-Qaeda at the time of his death.
- Walid Muallem, Deputy Prime Minister and Minister of Foreign Affairs and Expatriates of Syria
- Hamida Zakariya, first woman judge in South Yemen, Yemen, and the Arab World
- Mona Mostafa Mohamed, head of the university's Cancer Biology Research Laboratory
- Mostafa Madbouly, 54th prime minister of Egypt
- Talib Al Mamari (born 1972), Omani politician & activist

=== Nobel laureates ===
- Naguib Mahfouz, Nobel Prize for Literature in 1988
- Yasser Arafat, Nobel Peace Prize in 1994
- Mohamed ElBaradei, Nobel Peace Prize in 2005

== See also ==
- List of Islamic educational institutions
- Ahmed Lutfi el-Sayed, first president of Cairo University
- Education in Egypt
- List of universities in Egypt
