= List of hospitals in Egypt =

This is a list of hospitals in Egypt.

== Cairo ==
- 57357
- Abdel Kader Fahmy Hospital
- Adam International Hospital (IVF&ICSI)
- Ain Shams Specialized Hospital, Abbasia
- Ain Shams University Hospital (El Demerdash)
- Al-Agouza Hospital
- Al Salam Hospital
- Alexandria Psychiatric Centre
- Alzahra Hospital
- As Salam International Hospital of Alameda Health Care
- Amoun Hospital
- Anglo-American Hospital, Zamalek
- Arab Contractors Medical Center, Gabal Akhdar
- Asyout University Hospital
- Badran
- Behman Hospital, Maddi
- Bedaya Hospitals for IVF, "Website". Bedaya Hospital.
- Cairo Institute of Radiology
- Cairo Kidney Center
- Cairo Medical Center, Heliopolis
- Cleopatra Hospital, Heliopolis
- Coptic Hospital
- Dar Al Fouad Hospital
- Dar el Hekma Hospital, Nasr City
- Dar el Salam General Hospital
- Dar el Oyoun Hospital
- Dar El Teb Diagnostic Center
- Dar El Teb IVF Center
- Dar El Shefa Hospital
- Demerdash Hospital
- Egyptian Medical Services Co. (EMS) - Cairo Dialysis Center
- Egyptian Medical Services Co. (EMS) - Sharm El Sheikh Dialysis Center
- Egyptian Medical Services Co. (EMS) - Hurghada Dialysis Center
- El Borg Hospital
- El Fayrouz Hospital
- El Ganzouri Specialized Hospital
- El Galaa Hospital
- El Gomhoureyaa Hospital
- El Kablat Hospital
- El Kateb - Cairo Hospital
- Elixir Gastro-hepatic care center, Mohandesin, Giza (Alameda Medical Care Corporate)
- El Madina Hospital - Cairo
- El Merghany Hospital
- El Mobarra Maadi Hospital
- El Monera General Hospital
- El Nada Maternity Hospital
- El Nozha International Hospital, Heliopolis
- El Salam Hospital El Haram
- El Safa Hospital
- El Shoruk Hospital
- El Tawfiaiia Hospital
- Ebtihag Shafik Hospital
- Gohar Hospital & Women's Health Clinic
- Garden City Hospital
- Hassabo International Hospital
- Hayat Medical Center, Heliopolis
- Heliopolis Cardiac Center
- Hussein University Hospital
- Ibn Sina Hospital (Egypt), Dokki
- International Medical Center Cairo
- Italian Hospital Cairo
- Greek Hospital Cairo
- Kasralainy Hospital
- Misr El Amal Hospital
- Misr International
- MISR Cancer Center
- Nasser General Hospital
- National Cancer Institute Egypt
- New Kasr El Aini Hospital
- New Cairo Hospital
- Nile Badrawi Hospital
- October 6 University (O6U) Hospital
- Red Crescent
- Roxy Hospital
- Saudi German Hospital SGH Cairo (150 Beds General Hospital)
- Shaalan Surgi Center
- Theodor Bilharz Research Institute
- Sheikh Zayed specialized Hospital
- Heliopolis Neuro-Center
- Watany Eye Hospitals
- Zahraa University Hospital
- Zohairy Hospital

== Alexandria ==
- Agial Hospital (Assisted Reproduction), Gynecologic Endoscopy, Obstetrics & Gynecology, NICU)
- Alexandria University Hospitals:
1. Borg El Arab University Hospital
2. Alexandria Main University hospital (El Meery, Koleyet El Teb)
3. El Shatby Pediatric
4. El Shatby Gynaecology and Obstetrics
5. El Hadara (Queen Nariman Hospital) for Orthopaedics and Neuropsychiatry
- Al Salama Al jadeeda Hospital
- Alex Radiology Center
- Alex Sidney Kiel (ASK)
- Agial Hospital
- Alexandria Pediatric Center
- Alexandria Medical Center
- Armed Forces
- Badrawy Hospital
- Coptic Hospital
- Dermatological
- Dar el Shefa'
- Dar Ismail (Obstetrics)
- Dar ELAraby Maternity Hospital
- Dr. Mahmoud Ghanem (Psychiatry)
- Dr. Hassab Hospital
- Dr. Ibrahim Obeid
- Dr. Mohamed Milad
- Dr. Mohamed Nabawi El Mohandes
- El-Yousser Medical Center
- Dr. Shalaby - Alexandria
- Al Helal Al Ahmar Hospital
- El Ahram
- El Amin El Kheireya - Alexandria
- El Anba Takla - Alexandria
- El Kabbari
- El Ma'moora Psychiatry Hospital
- El Madina El Tebbeya
- El Maleka Nazly Paediatric Hospital
- El Mowassah
- El Seguini (El Sammak Hospital)
- El Sherook
- El Thaghr Specialized
- Fevers (El homeyat)
- Farook Ophthalmology Hospital
- German Hospital
- Gamal Abdel Nasser Hospital
- Horus Vision Correction Center
- Mabarret El Asafra
- Maternity - Alexandria
- Miami Private
- Mohamed Ragab El Kheiry
- Mostashfa el Ozon
- Sayedaty for Gynaecology and Obstetrics
- Sharq el Madina
- Saudi German Hospital (SGH) - Alex West (150 general hospital beds)
- Sidi Bishr - Alexandria El Sekka
- Specialized Universal Network of Oncology (SUN) (Cancer Treatment and Screening Center)
- Victoria Hospital
- Alex Specialized Hospital (Obstetrics & Pediatrics)
- Hassab Hospital
- Victorya Hospital
- Siklam Hospital

== Red Sea ==
- Alkawther Hospital
- The Egyptian Hospital
- Red Sea Hospital
- Port Ghalib Hospital

== Mansoura ==
- Al-Hekma Neurology, Neurosurgery and Advanced Surgeries Hospital
- Mansoura Medical Center
- Mansoura University Hospitals

== South Sinai Governorate ==
- Sharm International Hospital

== Zagazig ==
=== Ministry of Health and Population hospitals ===
- Zagazig General Hospital - El Hokamaa
- Zagazig General Hospital - El Ahrar
- El Kenayate District Hospital
- El Mabarah-Hospital - Health Insurance Organization
- Chest Hospital (Egypt)
- Fever Hospital
- Ophthalmic Hospital

=== Private hospitals ===
- Al Salam Hospital
- Fatih MediPlex Hospital
- Al Haramain Specialized Hospital
- Anwar Al Haramain Hospital
- Al Taisseir Specialized Hospital
- Al Nasr Hospital
- Gawish Medical Center
- Al Goumhoria Hospital
- Aldar Hospital, Zagazig
- El Sharkia Eye Center
- El Delta Abdel Latif Hospital
- Alzakazik International Hospital
- Al Obour Specialized Hospital
- Al Fatah Specialized Hospital
- Al Fredaws Specialized Hospital
- Al Forkan Specialized Hospital
- Al Montazah Specialized Hospital
- Al Nil Hospital
- Dr. Hamdy El Sayed Hospital
- Khater Specialized Hospital
- Saad Soliman Hospital
- Hemida Medical Center Hospital
- Makka Al Mokarrama Hospital
- Nour Al Eslam Hospital
- Waly For Surgery Hospital
- South Sinai Hospital
- Kepala Butuh

=== Zagazig University hospitals ===
Zagazig University hospitals include:

- Emergency – Istekbal - Hospital
- Pediatrics Hospital
- General Medicine Hospital
- Specialized Medicine Hospital
- Mubarak Hospital
- New Surgery Hospital
- Socialized Surgery-Assalam-Hospital
- Tumor & Oncology Hospital
- Accidents & Trauma Hospital
- Economic Treatment – Iktessady-Hospital

== Specialized hospitals ==
=== Bone diseases ===
- As Salam International Hospital, Corniche El Nile, Maadi
- National institute for neuromotor system Imbaba
- Helal Hospital - Specializing in bone surgery

=== Eye Diseases ===
- International Eye Hospital
- Watany Eye Hospitals
- Clear Vision Laser Center
- Dr Khalil Eye Clinic, Eye of Cairo
- Rowad Eye Hospital - Cairo
- Dar el Oyoun Eye Hospital
- Research Institute of Ophthalmology, Giza
- Maghrabi Eye Hospital & Centers
- International Eye Center
- National Institute for Eye Diseases and Surgery
- Suzan Mubarak Center for Eye Tumor
- Mostafa Kamel Military Hospital - Alexandria
- German Hospital - Alexandria
- Sharkia Eye Center

=== Geriatric medicine ===
- Ain Shams University Hospital (Geriatric Medicine Department and Geriatrics ICU)
- The International Medical Center (Cairo - Ismailia Desert Road)
- Palestine Hospital (Long Term Care)
- Center of Elderly Care (Helwan University)
- Boulaq Al-Dakror Hospital (Ministry of Health and Population)
- Al-Mataryia Hospital (Ministry of Health and Population)
- El-Sahel Hospital (Ministry of Health and Population)

=== Heart diseases ===
- Dar Al Fouad Hospital (Heart clinic and surgery)
- As Salam International Hospital
- Nasser Institute for Search and Treatment, Cairo
- National Heart Institute (Egypt), Cairo-Imbaba, Kit Kat
- International Medical Center (Cairo, Egypt), Cairo
- Mehalla Cardiac Center, Mehalla, Gharbiya
- Port-Said Cardiac Center, Port-Said
- Cairo Center for Heart Catheter (Cairo Cath)
- Heliopolis Heart Center - Heliopolois
- Cardioscan
- Alexandria Center for Heart Catheter
- International Heart Center - Alexandria
- Elborg Hospital
- Ismailia Cardiac Center- Ismailia

=== Kidney diseases ===
- Al Salam International Hospital, Corniche El Nile, Maadi
- Egyptian Medical Services Co. (EMS) - Cairo Dialysis Center
- Egyptian Medical Services Co. (EMS) - Sharm El Sheikh Dialysis Center
- Egyptian Medical Services Co. (EMS) - Hurghada Dialysis Center
- El Salam Hospital (kidney center)
- Kidney stones disintegration centers - ElKatteb Center
- The National Institute for kidney

=== Liver diseases ===
- The National Institute for Liver Diseases (Menofya)
- International Center for Digestive System Diseases
- Theodor Bilharz Research Institute
- Elixir Gastro - Hepatic Care Center, Giza (Branch-1) (part of Alameda Medical Caree: Own As-Salam International Hospital (Kattameya International Hospital)

=== Obstetrics and gynecology ===
- Gohar Hospital & Women's Health Clinic

=== Parasitology ===
- Theodor Bilharz Research Institute, Giza

=== Pediatrics ===
- Abu El Reish Pediatrics Hospital
- Children Hospital, Assiut University

=== Psychiatric ===
- Heliopolis Psychiatric Hospital
- Abbassia Psychiatric Hospital, Ministry of Health
- Behman Psychiatric Hospital
- Aldar Hospital, Zagazig
- Maamora Psychiatric Hospital, Ministry of Health
- Khanka Psychiatric Hospital, Ministry of Health
- Helwan Psychiatric Hospital, Ministry of Health
- Port Said Psychiatric Hospital, Ministry of Health
- Asiut Psychiatric Hospital, Ministry of Health
- Psychological Medicine Hospital - Dr. Adel Sadek
- Dr.Omar Shaheen Psychiatric Hospital
- Maadi Palace for Psychometrics
- Al Mokkatum Hospital
- Abu el-Azayem Psychiatric Hospital
- Rehab Hospital
- Dr. Gamal Aboul Azayem Psychiatric Hospitals
- Sleep Care Clinic (Sleep Disorders Center)
- Al Mashfa Psychiatric Hospital and Resort
- Agiad Psychiatric Hospital

=== Psychogeriatrics ===
- Abbassia Psychiatric Hospital, Ministry of Health
- Psychological Medicine Hospital - Dr. Adel Sadek
- Psychometrics - Behman Psychiatric Hospital
- Dr. Omar Shaheen Psychiatric Hospital
- Maadi Palace for Psychometrics
- Al Mokkatum Psychiatric Hospital
- Rehab Hospital

=== Sleep medicine ===
- Cairo Center for Sleep Disorders (CairoSleep)
- Sleep Care Clinic (Center for Sleep Disorders and Sleep Medicine)
- Elixir Gastro - Hepatic Care Center, Giza (Branch-1) (Part of Alameda Medical Care Corporate: Own As-Salam International Hospital - Kattameya International Hospital)

=== Tumors ===
- Alfacure Oncology Center
- National Cancer Institute (Egypt)
- Syzium Center Kasser el Eini
- Egypt International Center
- As Salam International Hospital
- 57357 Children's Cancer Hospital Foundation

=== Weight reduction ===
- Elixir Gastro-hepatic care center, Giza (Branch-1) (Part of Alameda Medical Care Corporate: Own As-Salam International Hospital - Kattameya International Hospital)
