= Mohammed Balousha =

Palestinian journalist and photographer

- Mohammed Balousha in press gear
- Born: 1986; Gaza Strip, Palestine
- Died: December 14, 2024 (aged 37–38); Gaza City, Palestine
- Occupations: Journalist, Photographer
- Employer: Al Mashhad Media
- Known for: Reporting on humanitarian issues in Gaza

Mohammed Balousha (Arabic: محمد بالوشة) was a Palestinian journalist and photographer known for his work documenting life and conflict in the Gaza Strip. He was affiliated with the Emirati-owned Al Mashhad Media and contributed to various local and international media outlets. Balousha was recognised for his reporting from conflict zones and his efforts to shed light on humanitarian issues in Gaza.

== Early life and career ==
Balousha began his journalism career in Gaza, where he worked with several media organisations. He gained recognition for his coverage of the humanitarian situation in the Gaza Strip, often reporting from areas heavily affected by conflict.

Balousha was the director of the TV channel Palestine Today.

== Reporting on humanitarian issues ==
One of Balousha's notable contributions was his reporting on the conditions at Gaza's Al-Nasr Children's Hospital. In November 2023, he reported on the decomposing bodies of premature infants left in the hospital's intensive care unit, highlighting the severe shortages of medical supplies and personnel due to the ongoing conflict. This report brought international attention to the dire conditions in Gaza's medical facilities and underscored the impact of the conflict on healthcare services.

== Injury and death ==
On 16 December 2023, Balousha was shot and injured by an Israeli sniper while reporting near his home in the Jabalya refugee camp in northern Gaza.

He was wearing a press helmet and flak jacket at the time of the incident. Balousha believed the shot was fired by an Israeli sniper hidden in a nearby residential building. He was later hospitalised for his injuries and underwent treatment.

Despite his injuries, Balousha continued his journalistic work. On 14 December 2024, he was killed in an Israeli drone strike while returning from a medical check-up at the Sheikh Radwan neighborhood clinic in northern Gaza City. The Committee to Protect Journalists (CPJ) reported that Balousha was 38 years old at the time of his death.
