= Attacks on protected zones and civilians in Gaza =

Attacks on protected zones and civilians in the Gaza Strip during the Gaza war have led to the killing of over 75,000 Palestinians and the displacement of over 2 million people, as well as the collapse of the education system and the destruction of most homes and hospitals. The UN estimated 90% of civilian infrastructure have been destroyed and 70% of the city's water production has been disrupted. Amnesty International stated that experts described the speed, scale and magnitude of destruction in Gaza as "unprecedented" in the 21st century, with large areas destroyed and critical infrastructure, agricultural land and cultural and religious sites destroyed, leaving substantial parts of Gaza uninhabitable.

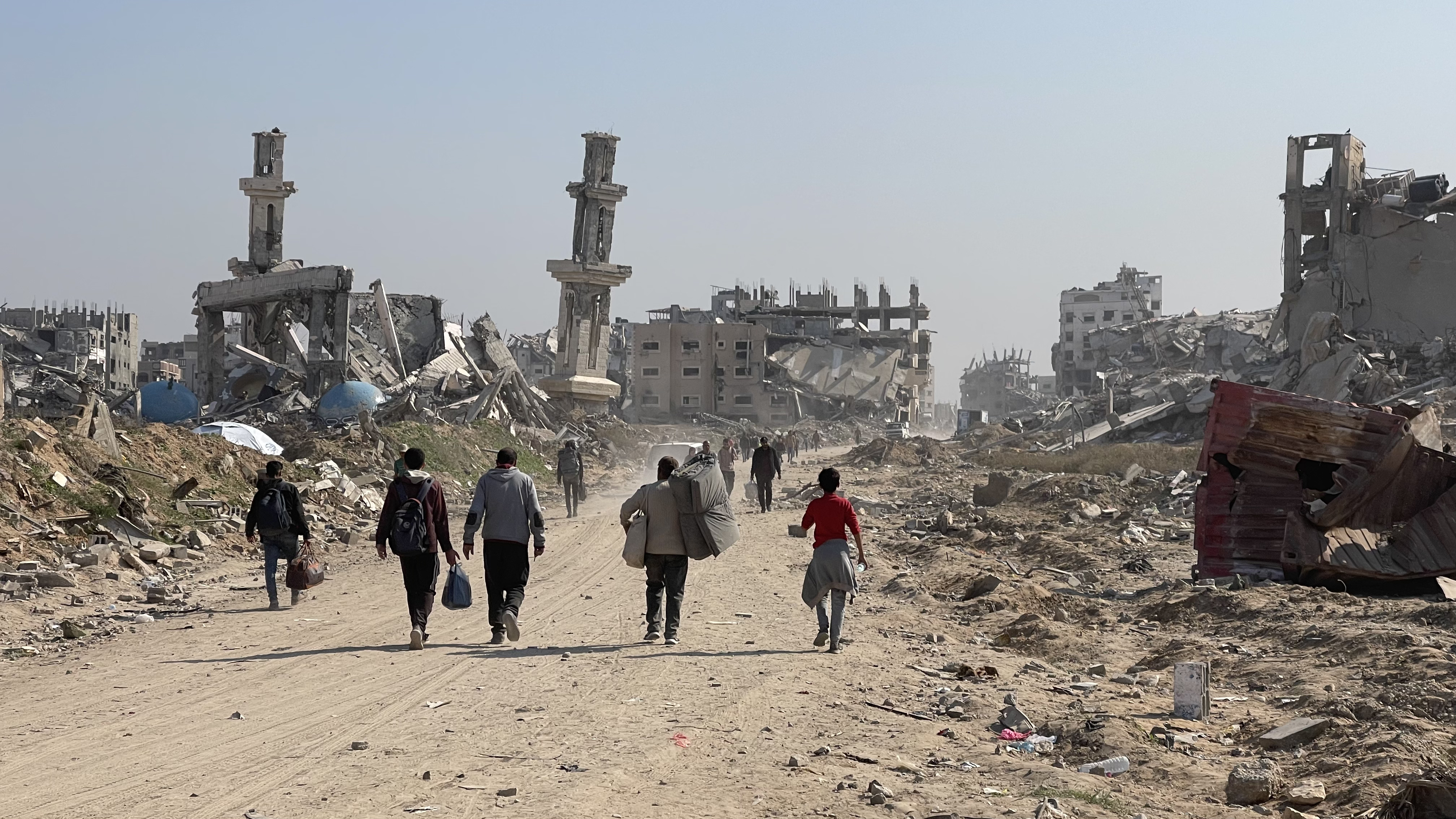
Displacement of Gaza Strip residents during the Gaza–Israel war

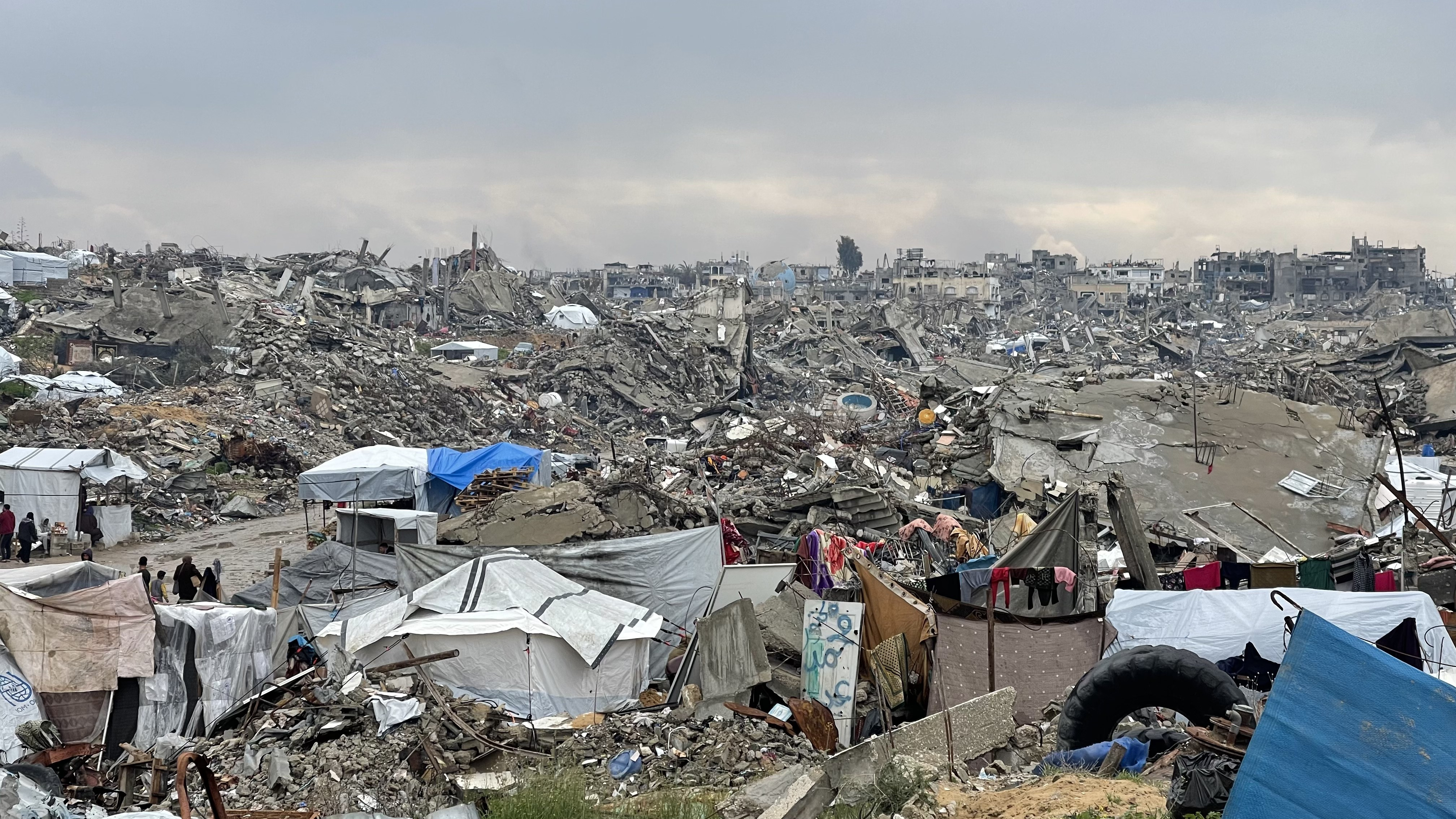
Ruins of Beit Lahia in the Gaza Strip following bombardment (February 2025)

In December 2023, The Wall Street Journal reported that 29,000 Israeli bombs, munitions and shells had been dropped on the densely populated strip, leaving the majority of the city's water, electrical, communications, and healthcare infrastructure damaged beyond repair. Human rights monitors have criticized Israel's use of heavy explosive weapons (such as 2000-pound bombs) and white phosphorus in densely populated areas as a prima facie violation of the proportionality requirement, as the incidental harm is generally vast. The New York Times, Human Rights Watch and Amnesty International have documented that Israeli heavy bombs have wiped out entire multigenerational families and neighbourhoods and struck crowded civilian spaces like markets and designated evacuation sites. In January 2024, researchers from Oregon State University and the City University of New York estimated that 50 to 62 percent of all buildings in the Gaza Strip were damaged or destroyed. By October 2025, the United Nations estimated that 83% of all structures and houses had been destroyed or damaged.

Military operations targeting water infrastructure, alongside blockade measures, have led to most of the Palestinian population being displaced from their homes, and reinforced severe shortages of safe water and widespread starvation. United Nations experts have criticized Israel, alleging that these measures amounted to collective punishment and constituted the use of starvation and deprivation of water as methods of warfare.

Israel has faced accusations of war crimes and genocide from South Africa, the UN Human Rights Council, International Association of Genocide Scholars (IAGS), and Amnesty International, among others, due to deliberate restriction of water and food, the number of civilian casualties and the percentage of civilian infrastructure destroyed, including Palestinian refugee camps, schools, mosques, churches, and more. In September 2025, the United Nations Independent International Commission of Inquiry on the Occupied Palestinian Territory concluded that Israel had committed four of the five acts of genocide defined under the Genocide Convention in Gaza since 7 October 2023.

== Healthcare facilities ==
The healthcare system in Gaza has collapsed due to the blockade of Gaza, lack of fuel, power cuts, and airstrikes. From the beginning of the war to 30 November 2023, the World Health Organization reported 427 attacks on health care in the West Bank and Gaza Strip. By February 2024, it was reported that "every hospital in Gaza is either damaged, destroyed, or out of service due to lack of fuel." On 24 January 2024, the WHO announced that only seven of 24 hospitals in northern Gaza and seven of 12 hospitals in southern Gaza were operational. On 7 February 2024, the United Nations announced that only 4 of 22 health centers in Gaza remained operational.

In 8 October, 2025, a joint statement was made by national medical associations, including the British Medical Association, who reported that at least 94% of hospitals in the Gaza Strip had been damaged or destroyed, with many being rendered non-operational.

=== List of attacked healthcare facilities ===
- Al-Ahli Arab Hospital
- Al-Amal Hospital
- Al-Aqsa Martyrs Hospital
- Al-Shifa Hospital
- Al-Quds Hospital
- Al-Rantisi and Al-Nasr children's hospitals
- Al Awda Hospital
- European Hospital
- Indonesian Hospital
- Jordan Field Hospital
- Kamal Adwan Hospital
- Kuwaiti Hospital
- Nasser Medical Complex
- Palestine Children's Relief Fund
- Rehabilitation Centre for Visually Impaired
- Sheikh Hamad bin Khalifa al-Thani Hospital
- Turkish-Palestinian Friendship Hospital
- Yafa Hospital
- Yemen Al-Saeed Hospital

=== Medical personnel and emergency services ===
On November 3, 2023, an Israeli strike hit a marked ambulance outside Al-Shifa Hospital that resulted in the killing of 15 people and injuring 60. On 29 Jan, 2024, an ambulance and two paramedics were dispatched to rescue a 6- year old Palestinian girl, Hind Rajab, who had contacted the Palestinian Red Crescent for help. Approximately 12 days later, the bodies of Rajab, her family members and the two paramedics was found at the scene, along with a destroyed ambulance nearby. Israel claimed its forces were not in the vicinity at the time. However, an investigation by The Washington Post based on satellite imagery, communication records, and visual evidence, reported that Israeli armoured units were indeed operating in that area. Independent analyses by the Forensic Architecture concluded it was likely Israeli armoured units that fired on the car that Rajab and her family had been in, as well as the ambulance and paramedics.

== Schools and universities ==
From 7 October 2023 to late March 2024, the United Nations reported multiple airstrikes on more than 200 educational facilities, including universities and schools, by the Israel Defense Forces (IDF) in the Gaza Strip. The attacks have resulted in the collapse of the Gazan education system, affecting 625,000 students.

=== List of attacked schools and universities ===
- The Abu Hussein School
- The Al-Buraq School
- The Al-Fakhoora School
- The Al-Falah School
- The Al-Maghazi UNRWA School
- The An-Nazla School
- The Al-Sardi School
- The Al-Tabaeen School
- The Haifa School
- The Israa University
- The Martyr Assad Safwati School
- The Nuseirat school
- The Osama bin Zaid school
- The Salah Ad-Din School

== Cultural, historical and religious places ==
According to international law, cultural heritage, cemeteries, and religious places are considered civilian infrastructure and their destruction can be considered a war crime of “committing outrages upon personal dignity” under the Rome Statute. According to historians, Gaza is one of the oldest inhabited areas in the world, dating back to at least the 15th century BC.

In South Africa's genocide case against Israel, Israel was accused of targeting Palestinian culture, destroying modern museums and cultural centers, and threatening the "cultural potential" of Gaza by damaging schools as well as teachers and killing journalists and intellectuals. Israel claimed that the targeting of cultural and religious places and cemeteries is due to finding and returning the bodies of Israeli hostages and Hamas using these places for military purposes. CNN's analysis of satellite images and videos showed that the Israeli forces use cemeteries as military outposts. According to CNN's investigation, at least 16 cemeteries in Gaza have been desecrated by IDF, tombstones have been destroyed, the soil has been overturned, and in some cases, bodies have been unearthed.

Israeli attacks have destroyed more than 200 buildings of cultural and historical importance in Gaza, including mosques, cemeteries, and museums. UNESCO reported that at least 22 sites, including mosques, churches, historical houses, universities, and archives, were damaged or destroyed as a result of multiple Israeli attacks.

=== List of attacked cultural and historical places ===
- The Rafah Museum
- The Al Qarara Museum
- The Mathaf al-Funduq Museum
- The 13th-century Qasr Al-Basha (Pasha's Palace)
- The Rashad El Shawa Cultural Center
- The Library of the Great Omari Mosque
- The Samir Mansour community bookshop
- The Union of Palestinian artists on Jalaa Street
- The clay pots in the al-Fawakher district
- The Hammam al-Sammara (Samaritan Bathhouse)
- The fortified city of Tell el-Ajjul (Calves Hill)
- The Church of Saint Porphyrius
- The Holy Family Church
- The Byzantine Church of Jabalia
- The Saint Hilarion Monastery
- The historic old city
- The archaeological site of Anthedon Harbour

=== List of attacked cemeteries ===
- The Gaza War Cemetery
- The Bani Suheila cemetery
- The rd-al-Moharbeen (the Roman Necropolis)
- The Al Falouja cemetery
- The Shajaiya cemetery
- The Al-Tuffah cemetery
- The Islamic cemetery in southern Gaza
- The New Bureij cemetery
- The Sheikh Radwan cemetery
- The Beit Lahia cemetery

=== List of attacked mosques ===
- The Gaza's medieval Omari Mosque
- The ancient Othman bin Qashqar Mosque
- The Sayed al-Hashim Mosque
- The Katib al-Waliya Mosque
- The Al-Bukhari Mosque
- The Khalid Bin Al-Waleed mosque
- The Khalil Al-Rahman mosque
- The Al-Ansar Mosque

== Shelters and camps ==
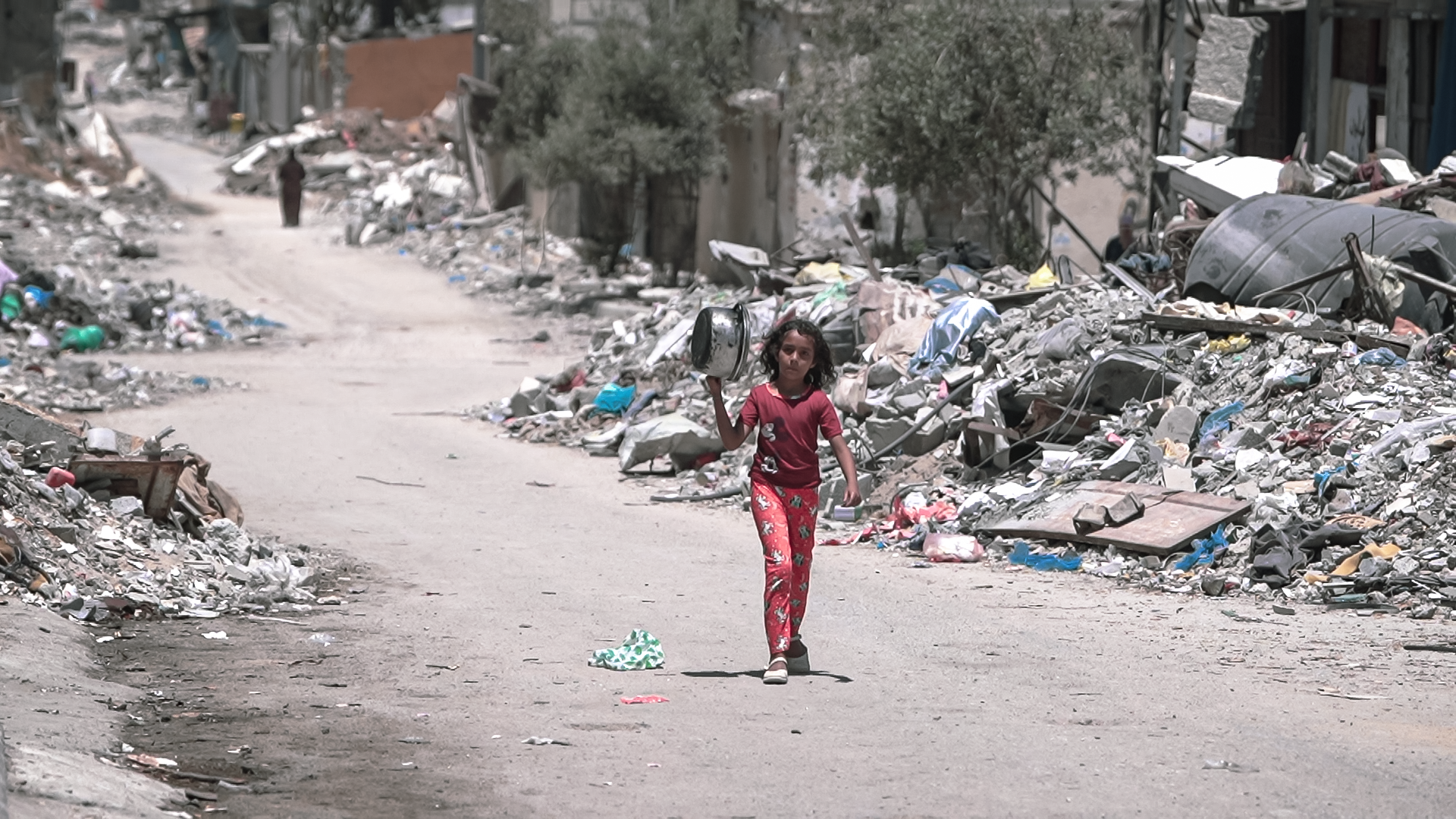
A girl in Gaza carrying a pot to collect food during the Gaza–Israel war

In the Gaza war, the Israel Defense Forces (IDF) have carried out numerous airstrikes on densely populated Palestinian refugee camps in the Gaza Strip and West Bank, as part of the bombardment and invasion of Gaza.

=== List of attacked Shelters and Camps ===
- The Jabalia refugee camp
- The Al-Shati refugee camp
- The Al-Mawasi refugee camp
- The Maghazi refugee camp
- The Tel al-Sultan refugee camp
- The Al-Bureij refugee camp
- The Nuseirat refugee camp
- The Shaboura refugee camp
- The Jenin refugee camp
- The Nur Shams camp

== Civilians ==
Since 7 October 2023, at least 38,983 Palestinians, most of them civilians, have been killed, including more than 15,000 children. More than 89,727 people have been injured and more than 10,000 people are missing in Israel's war on Gaza. In March 2024, Al Jazeera reported that Israeli forces made a pattern of killing entire families by targeting homes where they had taken shelter. On 29 February 2024, Gaza's Ministry of Health reported that 44% of the fatalities were children.

=== Heavy bombs ===
In the first month of the war, Israel dropped hundreds of 2000-pound bombs on the Gaza Strip. 2000-pound bombs are four times heavier than the vast majority of the largest bombs that the US has used in the Iraq war and are capable of flattening entire apartment buildings and yield a lethal fragmentation radius that can kill or injure with a range of up to 365 meters (about 1,198 feet), or the equivalent of 58 soccer fields in area. Weapons and warfare experts have warned against its usage as they point out that Gaza is one of the most densely populated areas in the world and these bombs will likely lead to indiscriminate civilian harm. Marc Garlasco, a former US defense intelligence analyst, said that the density of bombardment in Gaza was not even seen during the Iraq war, and one needs to go way back to the Vietnam war to find comparable levels.

In December 2023, The New York Times reported that Israel used hundreds of 2000-pound bombs in heavily packed areas that it had designated as "safe zones" for evacuating civilians. Using satellite imagery and AI tools, reporters identified over 200 bomb craters that were consistent with the use of 2,000-pound bombs. In May 2024, the US conceded that the 2000-pound bombs they had supplied to Israel were killing civilians and announced they will be pausing shipments of MK84 2,000-pound bombs to Israel. Then U.S. President Joe Biden told CNN that, "Civilians have been killed in Gaza as a consequence of those bombs and other ways in which they go after population centres". The US export block however was lifted shortly afterwards by the Trump administration and a U.S. shipment of 1,800 MK-84 2,000 pound bombs was delivered to Israel in February 2025.

=== AI-assisted bombings ===
A 2023 US intelligence report had indicated that 40 to 45% of the 29,000 air-to-ground munitions that Israel has used in Gaza were unguided "dumb bombs". According to weapon experts, these bombs are normally used for situations when targets are more dispersed and use wasn't indiscriminate, but are not recommended for use in densely populated areas because, compared to smaller precision-guided munitions, they pose a greater risk to civilians.

In April 2024, an investigation by +972 Magazine and Local Call reported the testimony from six anonymous Israeli intelligence officers who described an AI system called "Lavender", which was allegedly used to identify targets rapidly with limited human oversight in the early stages of the war. According to the sources, it was too costly to use precision munitions on low level targets and so some strikes on lower value targets were carried out using unguided "dumb bombs". Lavender was used alongside "the Gospel", another AI-based decision support system, which was designed to recommend structures and buildings as targets rather than focusing on individuals.

The Israeli intelligence officers stated when a specific target was issued to the Israeli Air Force to bomb, that target was typically a family home; and that the list of persons considered likely to be militants was generated by software, and their family homes were chosen as targets. They added that operators were "permitted to kill 15 or 20 civilians during airstrikes" when targeting low-ranking militants. Conflict experts cited by The Guardian, have said that the combined use of AI-assisted targeting systems and unguided bombs would explain the "shockingly high death toll" during the war.

== Other protected and safe zones ==
Amnesty International's investigation into nine airstrikes found that Israel violated international humanitarian law by failing to take all possible precautions to save civilians, or by taking out indiscriminate strikes that were unable to distinguish between civilian and military targets, or by attacks that may have been taken out against civilian objects. The BBC reported that since the beginning of December, the bombardment of southern and central Gaza has intensified, and the city of Khan Yunis bears the brunt of Israel's military attacks while Israel has repeatedly encouraged the people of Gaza to move south for their safety. Also, an NBC news investigation found Palestinians were killed in airstrikes in seven areas that the military had designated as safe zones.

The New York Times' analysis of the Israeli military's actions shows that since November, Israeli-controlled demolitions have destroyed hundreds of buildings, including mosques, schools, and entire sections of residential neighborhoods. The spokesperson of the Israeli army stated the reason for these controlled demolitions is the location and destruction of terrorist infrastructures embedded inside buildings in civilian areas, adding that sometimes entire neighborhoods serve as "combat complexes" for Hamas. While Israeli officials told The New York Times that Israel is demolishing Palestinian buildings near the border to create a security "buffer zone" inside Gaza, making it harder for fighters to carry out cross-border attacks, most of the destruction sites identified by The Times occurred well outside this buffer zone.

UN experts have called the destruction and bombing of more than half of the homes in Gaza by Israel, under the pretext of identifying and destroying Hamas, as "domicide" (the mass destruction of homes to make this land uninhabitable). Destroyed locations include the Palace of Justice (the main Palestinian court in Gaza), the Palestinian Legislative Council, 339 educational centers, 167 places of worship, and 26 of Gaza's 35 hospitals. Hugh Lovatt, a member of the European Council on Foreign Relations, claimed that Israel is "deliberately and methodically destroying the civil societies and infrastructure needed to govern and stabilize Gaza after the war”.

In late October, a document was leaked to the Israeli press by the Israeli Ministry of Intelligence, planning the forced and permanent transfer of 2.3 million Palestinians living in Gaza to Egypt's Sinai Peninsula. The document exposes an organization called "The Settlement Unit – Gaza Strip", which aims to resettle the Gaza Strip, 18 years after the withdrawal of Israeli forces and settlers from it. Italian historian Lorenzo Kamel said Israel wants to make the Gaza Strip uninhabitable by dropping tens of thousands of tons of bombs and targeting civilian infrastructure including schools, universities, hospitals, bakeries, shops, farmland and greenhouses, water stations, sewage systems, power plants, solar panels, and generators.

== Food aid sites ==
In July 2025, Amnesty International Australia reported that Israel had forcibly reduced aid distribution sites in Gaza from approximately four hundred during the temporary ceasefire to largely four military-controlled distribution points run by the Gaza Humanitarian Foundation (GHF), leading to overcrowding and mass casualty events.

GHF is a U.S.-based organization that receives support from the governments of Israel and the United States. The foundation has been criticized by the United Nations and several humanitarian organizations for allegedly politicizing and "weaponizing aid", as well as for assisting in ways deemed unsafe and degrading to Palestinians. The Israeli military has stated that its operations were focused on targeting Hamas members. There have been reports of Israeli forces and reportedly Israel-backed armed groups routinely shooting at civilians at these sites. Amnesty International reported that, in a span of less than four weeks, over 600 Palestinians were killed and nearly 4,000 injured while attempting to access or distribute food at sites run by the GHF.

From 27 May to 7 July 2025, the Office of the High Commissioner for Human Rights (OHCHR) reported that at least 798 people were killed due to Israeli airstrikes near various food distribution centers in Gaza, particularly those run by the Gaza Humanitarian Foundation (GHF). Of the casualties, 615 occurred near GHF locations, while 183 were reported along the routes of aid convoys.

== Disabling essential services ==
Legal experts and UN bodies widely regard Israel as an occupying power in Gaza and is therefore subject to obligations to ensure the running of services deemed essential to the civilian population. Prior to the war, Gaza was already under a strict blockade and was long described by critics and human rights groups as an "open-air prison". Key civilian infrastructure such as water systems, electricity networks, and sewage system, critical to the survival of the civilian population, are heavily dependent on supply routes and external inputs controlled by Israel.

During the first months of the war, Israel announced a siege and cut off its electricity supply to Gaza as well as restricting fuel, water supply lines, and border access. The effects were immediate and severely impacted the civilian population by limiting access to clean water, food, medical care, sanitation, electricity, and fuel needed for hospitals and heating. UN experts and human rights organizations criticized Israel, stating that the restrictions amounted to indiscriminate collective punishment that widely harms civilians.

By October 2025, humanitarian organizations and UN agencies reported that, in addition to restrictions on purification chemicals, equipment to repair damaged water pipes, and deliberate withholding of drinking water supplies, Israel's bombing campaigns have contributed to nearly 89% of Gaza's water infrastructure being destroyed or damaged, and more than 90 percent of households becoming water insecure. Aid organizations and health officials warned that unsafe water and collapsing sanitation systems have contributed to outbreaks of disease, and life-threatening dehydration, particularly among children and other vulnerable populations. There is also mounting evidence of widespread starvation and malnutrition due to the restrictions on food to the enclave.

UN experts have criticized Israel, alleging their bombings and their restrictions on food, water, and essential supplies have displaced most of the population and made them subject to dangerous levels of thirst. The UN experts stated, "This catastrophe was not only predictable; it was predicted. Israel's blockade and destruction of civilian infrastructure has left most of Gaza’s two million residents displaced and without access to the minimum vital amount of drinking water. This has led to deaths and widespread illness caused by water pollution, and a lack of sanitation and hygiene."

== See also ==
- Attacks on civilians in the Russian invasion of Ukraine
- Gaza genocide
- Gaza humanitarian crisis (2023–present)
- International law and the Arab–Israeli conflict
- Israel–Hezbollah conflict (2023–2024) § War crimes
- Sexual and gender-based violence against Palestinians during the Gaza war
- Violent incidents in reaction to the Gaza war
