= TBRI =

TBRI may refer to:

- Taiwan Banana Research Institute, research center in Pingtung County, Taiwan
- Theodor Bilharz Research Institute, research center in Giza, Egypt

== See also ==
- TBR1
