= 2023–2024 Gaza Strip preterm births =

- Part of the Gaza war, the Gaza humanitarian crisis, and the Gaza genocide
- Premature babies at Al-Shifa
Date	21 October 2023 – 31 December 2024
Location	Gaza Strip

Casualties and losses
- 31+ dead (Note: 8 at Al-Shifa.; 3 at Kamal Adwan.; 4 at Al-Nasr.; 16 at Emirati Hospital)

The Gaza Strip faced a premature baby crisis during the Gaza war and genocide. The situation escalated when the Israel Defense Forces raided Al-Shifa Hospital, Al-Nasr Children's Hospital, and Kamal Adwan Hospital. Reports of premature babies in intensive care having to be evacuated from Al-Shifa, as well as the destruction of embryos destined for implantation added to concerns about the rising number of preterm births in the Gaza Strip.

== Background ==
Starting on 21 October 2023, Medical Aid for Palestinians and UNICEF issued an "urgent warning" that 130 premature babies would die if fuel did not reach Gaza hospitals soon. On 23 October, officials in Gaza confirmed that due to the Israeli siege on fuel, when hospitals lost electricity, premature babies in NICUs were at risk of death. A press release from the International Rescue Committee (IRC) in April 2024 stated that pregnant women in Gaza had been experiencing premature labor and miscarriage at rates three times higher than before the conflict intensified. The rise was attributed to displacement, trauma, and malnutrition.

In November 2024, Adele Khodr, UNICEF's Regional Director for the Middle East and North Africa, emphasized the severe challenges faced by newborns in the Gaza Strip, stating that the war had disrupted fetal development, childbirth, and postnatal care, resulting in an increased need for intensive care among infants. Khodr also referenced reports from doctors highlighting a rising number of premature births, undernourished infants, and newborns with developmental complications.

== Al-Shifa Hospital ==
On 11 November, IDF spokesman Daniel Hagari stated the army would help evacuate babies from al-Shifa Hospital, but a Gaza Health Ministry spokesman stated Israel had not provided "any mechanism to get the babies out to a safer hospital." The same day, Physicians for Human Rights–Israel stated two premature babies had died due to the loss of electricity.

On 15 November, Israel launched a raid on al-Shifa Hospital, where three dozen premature babies were still sheltering. The director of Al-Shifa stated Israel's claim that it would provide incubators to premature babies was false. Reuters reported the IDF said that three battery powered incubators were on standby outside Gaza. The IDF released a video showing them depositing at the front gate of al-Shifa 300 liters (79 U.S. gal) of fuel and a photo of a soldier loading mobile incubators. One mother reported believing that her premature son was going to die. On 19 November, 31 premature babies at al-Shifa were evacuated by the Palestinian Red Crescent, WHO, and UNOCHA to southern Gaza. They were planned to be moved to Egypt with their families the following day. Two additional babies died soon after. The babies were reported to be suffering from severe hypoglycemia — insufficient blood sugar. On 20 November, 28 of the babies were evacuated to Egypt. Only eight were accompanied by their parents, as the others were orphans, or their parents were unable to leave Gaza. As of 20 November 2023, eight babies were reported as having died at al-Shifa during that month.

== Al-Nasr Children's Hospital ==
On 10 November, Doctors Without Borders reported that evacuating medical workers at Al-Nasr Children's Hospital had to leave babies in incubators after the IDF bombed the pediatric hospital. On 29 November, video footage from Al-Nasr showed the aftermath of the hospital's evacuation, with the five premature babies dead still in their incubators. The Euro-Mediterranean Human Rights Monitor confirmed the Al-Nasr infants' deaths. They stated the IDF had indicated to hospital staff they would evacuate the babies, though the IDF denied any involvement.

== Other hospitals ==
In mid-December, Israel began a military siege and raid on the Kamal Adwan hospital. On 14 December, the Gaza Health Ministry reported IDF soldiers had prevented medical staff from continuing support to 12 babies in intensive care. Three premature babies had died at Kamal Adwan in November following a power outage. In March 2024, Dr. Husam Abu Safiya, the acting head of Kamal Adwan, reported that his staff were treating 300 to 400 children a day, with 75% suffering from malnutrition. Between January and March 2024, 16 premature babies had died of malnutrition-related causes at the Al Helal Al Emirati Maternity Hospital in Rafah.

On 12 December 2024 the IDF announced a forced displacement order for Gaza City's Patient’s Friends Benevolent Society Hospital, leading Medical Aid for Palestinians (MAP) to issue a press release to the effect that this would completely shut down "advanced neo-natal care" across all of Northern Gaza. MAP also said that their doctors in the hospital would not be evacuating.

In February 2025, doctors at the Patient's Friends Benevolent Society Hospital reported that five babies had died due to cold weather, as well as the absence of adequate shelter and heating. Additionally, in Khan Younis, the head of the pediatric unit at the Nasser Hospital reported "that it [the unit] had received the body of a two-month-old girl who had died of hypothermia on Tuesday [25 February 2025]". The director general of the Gaza Health Ministry "alleged that Israel had "failed to comply with humanitarian protocols, including allowing the entry of medical equipment, heating supplies, tents, and mobile homes" since the ceasefire began on 19 January." COGAT, meanwhile, said that Israel was committed to its obligations and was allowing tents into the Strip.

== Rise in preterm births ==
A pediatric doctor at the Emirati Hospital in Rafah, stated the number of premature babies born in Gaza had risen sharply. On 23 November, Oxfam stated the number of premature births had risen by nearly one-third due to factors like stress and trauma. In February 2024, the UN Population Fund reported that the anxiety mothers were experiencing due to incessant bombings and fleeing for safety had led to a rise in premature births. In July 2024, Doctors Without Borders reported a rise in pre-term deliveries in southern Gaza.

== Destruction of embryos ==
A single strike on Gaza City's Al Basma IVF center, Gaza's largest IVF center, destroyed most of the frozen IVF embryos in the Gaza Strip. It destroyed 4000 human embryos and an additional 1000 samples of frozen sperms and eggs. The embryos were stored in liquid nitrogen, which did not require electricity to maintain; they only needed to be topped up once per month. But the blast blew the lid off 5 tanks, causing the liquid to quickly evaporate, which caused the embryos to defrost and die. They are 9 or more clinics in the Gaza Strip that perform IVF related procedures, but most of the embryos were stored in 5 liquid nitrogen tanks at the Al Basma center. The clinic was established in 1997 by obstetrician and gynecologist Bahaeldeen Ghalayini. Bahaeldeen Ghalayini said a single Israeli shell struck the part of the center where there embryos were stored on the ground floor, but he said he did not know if the lab had been specifically targeted by the strike.

== See also ==
- Effect of the Gaza war on children in the Gaza Strip
- Women in the Gaza war
