= Naguib Pasha Mahfouz =

Egyptian surgeon

Naguib Pasha Mahfouz نجيب باشا محفوظ
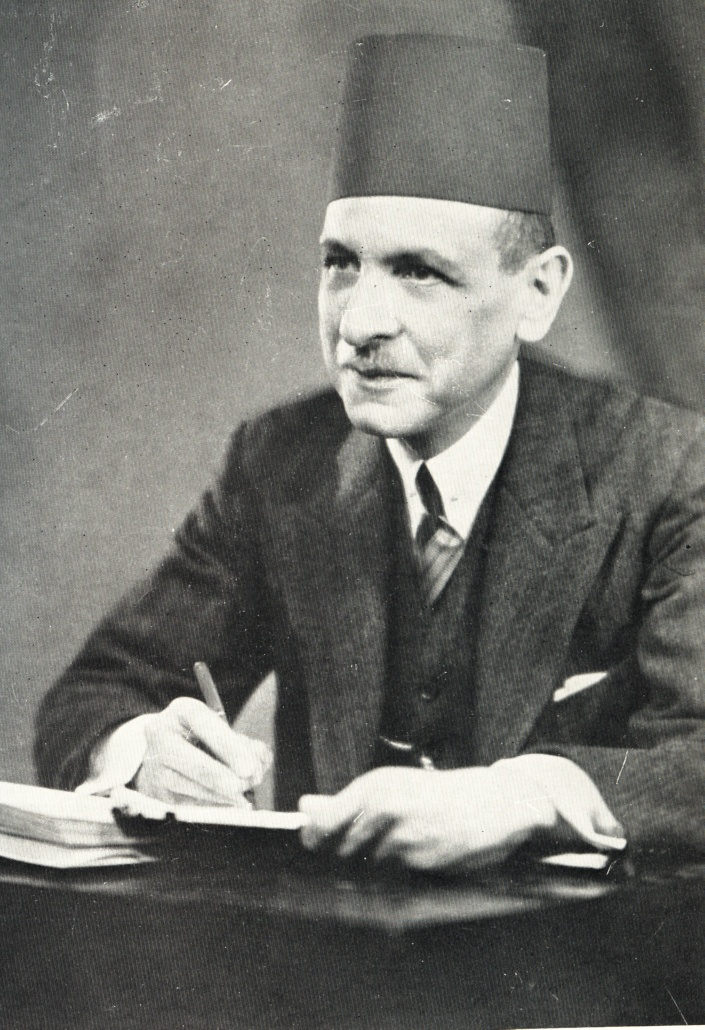
- Born: 5 January 1882; Mansoura, Egypt
- Died: 25 July 1974 (aged 92); Cairo, Egypt
- Other names: "Father of Obstetrics" "Father of Gynaecology"
- Occupations: physician, anesthesiologist, obstetrician, gynaecologist
- Known for: Obstetric Fistula
- Title: Dr. Naguib Pasha Mahfouz

Naguib Pasha Mahfouz (Arabic: نجيب باشا محفوظ / ALA-LC: Nagīb Bāshā Maḥfūẓ; 5 January 1882 – 25 July 1974) is known as the father of obstetrics and gynaecology in Egypt and was a pioneer in obstetric fistula.

== Early life ==
Mahfouz was born to a Coptic Christian family on 5 January 1882 in the city of Mansoura in the delta of Egypt.

== Education ==
He joined Kasr El Aini Medical School in 1898, where teaching was predominantly undertaken by eminent European professors. At this time, Qasr El Eyni Hospital had no department of obstetrics and gynaecology, and the only case of labour that he attended "ended fatally for both mother and child".

=== Cholera outbreak in Egypt 1902 ===
In June 1902, when Mahfouz was about to take his final year exams, there was an outbreak of cholera in Egypt and medical students were recruited to help combat the epidemic. The medical school was closed and exams postponed. Mahfouz was initially assigned to the Cairo railway station, to examine suspected cholera patients coming from Upper Egypt. Mahfouz paid a visit to the Health Department Director General and demanded to be sent to Mousha, a village in Upper Egypt near Assiut which was particularly hard-hit by the deadly disease and where a doctor had just succumbed to the same disease he had been sent to fight. In Mousha, young Mahfouz traced the cholera deaths to an infected well in a farmer's house. Within a week of the discovery of the well, the Mousha cholera epidemic had come to an end and so a nineteen-year-old medical student succeeded where a body of the ablest and most experienced British Public Health Department experts had failed. Mahfouz subsequently had similar success in fighting cholera in Deirout in Upper Egypt, as well as in and Alexandria.

== The first department of obstetrics and gynaecology in Egypt ==
Mahfouz qualified as a doctor in December 1902, coming top of his year. In 1904 and after a two-year spell at Suez hospital, he was appointed as an anaesthetist at Kasr El Aini hospital. As there was no such thing as a department of obstetrics or gynaecology at Kasr El Aini hospital, Mahfouz started a weekly gynaecological outpatient clinic. This turned out to be such a success that two whole wards were soon dedicated to obstetrical and gynaecological patients, and so the first department of obstetrics and gynaecology in Egypt came into existence. Mahfouz acquired much experience in dealing with difficult labour, partly from an agreement that he had struck with the medical officers who delivered women in their homes: whenever they faced a difficult labour, the medical officers would call Mahfouz into attendance. For his part, he would attend to the patient's house and help them deal with the most complicated cases without charging a fee. During the fifteen years to come, Mahfouz attended about two thousand women with difficult labour in their own homes. During this time, he recalls sleeping no more than two nights a week in the comfort of his own home. One of the children that Naguib Mahfouz delivered after a difficult labour, was named after him in 1911. This child later became the laureate of the Nobel Prize in Literature, the famous novelist Naguib Mahfouz.

== Career progression ==
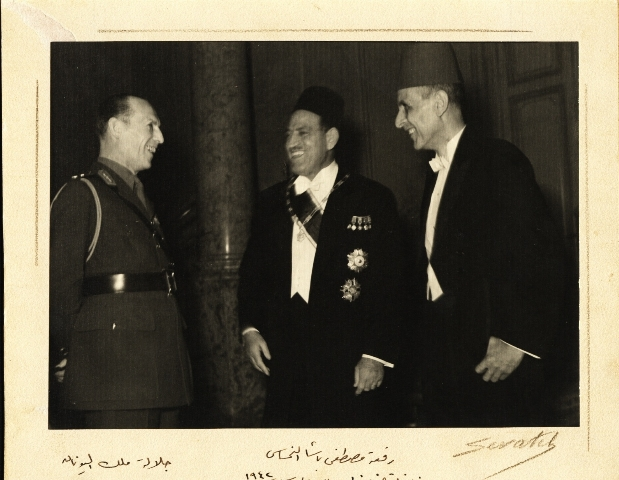
With King George II of Greece and Prime Minister Mostafa Pasha El Nahas

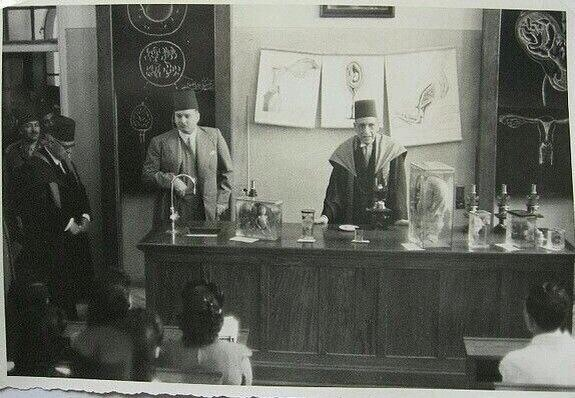
Professor Mahfouz lecturing, with King Farouk in attendance

Naguib Mahfouz was appointed as Professor of Obstetrics and Gynaecology at Kasr El Aini Hospital in January 1929, a post he occupied until he reached the age of retirement in January 1942. His term of service at Kasr El Aini was extended by five years at the unanimous request of his colleagues at the department of Obstetrics and Gynaecology. Mahfouz was also obstetrician and gynaecologist to the Egyptian Royal Family. His pioneering work on the surgical repair of urinary and faecal fistulae brought him and Kasr El Aini hospital international acclaim. The leading lights in his speciality came all the way to Egypt to watch him repair fistulae at Kasr El Aini and the Coptic Hospital, and he was invited to lecture and show films of his operations at the Universities of London, Oxford, Edinburgh, Geneva, and Lausanne to name a few.

== Mother and child welfare services ==
The absence of a maternity unit at Kasr El Aini hospital was great handicap to Naguib Mahfouz's work . Thanks to his efforts and unrelenting campaigning, the first maternity centre in Egypt came into existence at Kasr El Aini. Mahfouz reorganised the School of nursing and midwifery and taught general nursing and midwifery to its pupils for over thirty years. No less than one thousand midwives graduated under him. His two books on nursing and midwifery were used by the students for many years. In 1919, he started a pioneering scheme whereby midwives trained to the highest standards were allowed to deliver women in their own homes, a year before a similar program was started in England. In 1919, Mahfouz introduced the first antenatal clinics in Egypt, at the Kasr El Aini maternity hospital and in centres that he had opened in Cairo's deprived areas. Following this, he established a child welfare section at Kasr El Aini hospital, the first of its kind in Egypt. Many mother and child welfare centres were then built throughout the country.

== Foundation of the Mahfouz Museum of Obstetrics and Gynaecology ==
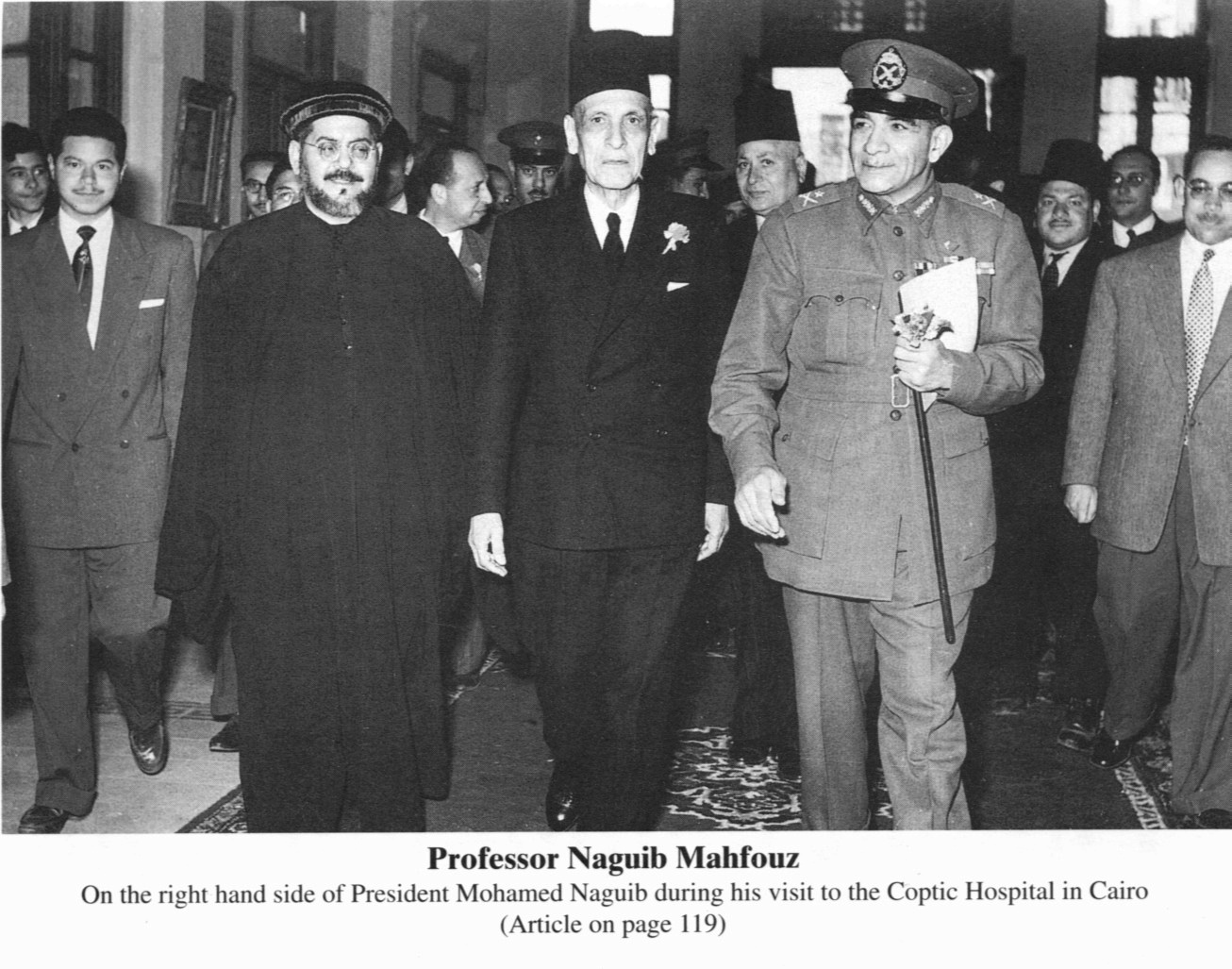
Professor Mahfouz with president Mohamed Naguib visiting the Coptic hospital, Cairo

Naguib Mahfouz launched his Museum of Obstetrics and Gynaecology in 1928. By 1930, he had managed to collect three thousand of the rarest specimens in obstetrics and gynaecology obtained from his operations. He offered the museum which housed them and which was later named after him in 1932, as a gift to the Kasr El Aini Medical School. In 1945, the museum was described by the then President of the Royal College of Obstetricians and Gynaecologists of England, Sir Eardley Holland, as "a remarkable collection" and " a wonderful monument to the name of its founder". Mahfouz provided specimens to the museums of each of the universities of Ein Shams, Alexandria, Assiut and Khartoum. The Naguib Mahfouz Museum of Obstetrics and Gynaecology at Kasr El Aini Medical School was renovated and relaunched in 2018.

=== Publications ===
Naguib Mahfouz was a prolific author on a wide variety of subjects ranging from urinary and faecal fistulae, spinal analgesia, fibroids, ectopic pregnancy, gynaecological malignancies, pelvic infections and caesarean sections. One of his greatest achievements was the Atlas of Mahfouz's Obstetric and Gynaecological Museum, which he published in three volumes in 1949. The atlas contained pictures and slides of all the specimens found at the Mahfouz Museum of obstetrics and gynaecology. The atlas was described by Sir Eardley Holland as "no doubt the best book that has appeared in obstetrics and gynaecology". Other books include the celebrated History of Medical Education in Egypt which he wrote in 1935. He also wrote Principles of Gynaecology and the Art of Obstetrics, both in Arabic.

== Honours ==
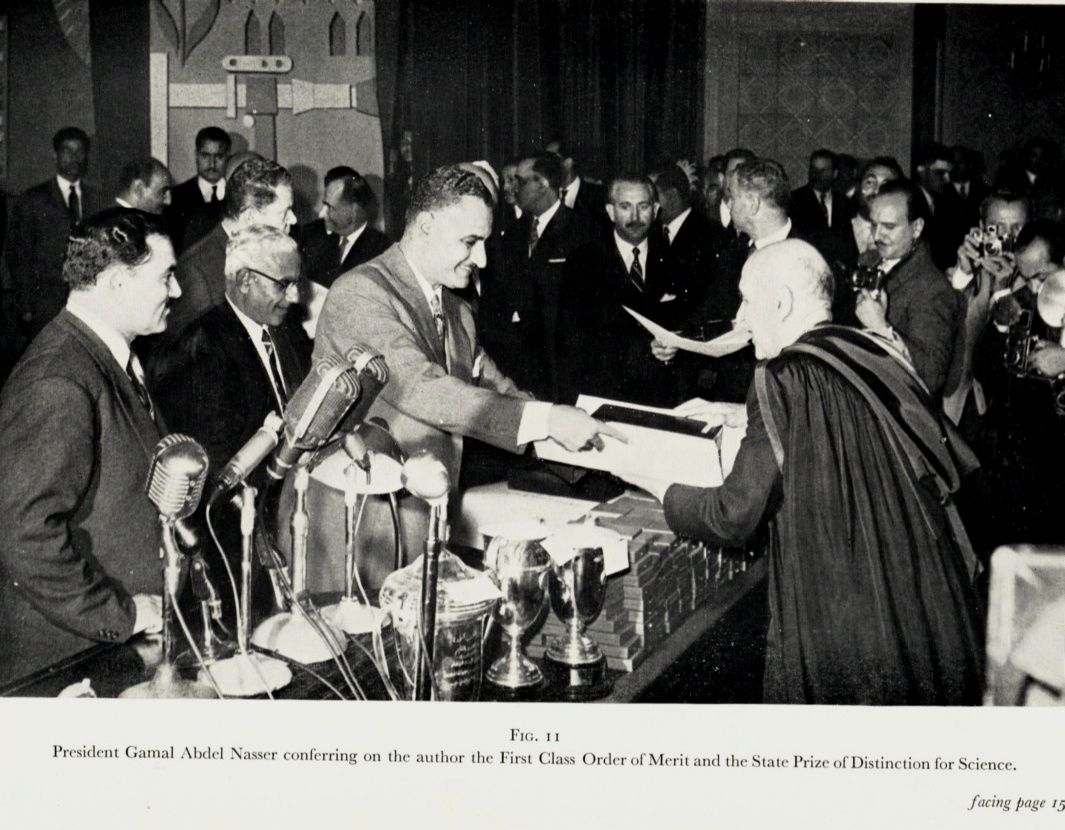
President Gamal Abdel Nasser granted Professor Mahfouz the First Class Order of Merit and the State Prize of Distinction for Science

In 1919, Naguib Mahfouz was granted the Order of the Nile. In 1935, he was elected honorary fellow of the Royal College of Obstetricians and Gynaecologists of England, an honour only bestowed on five eminent doctors at any one time. In 1937, he became a fellow of each of the Royal College of Physicians of England and of the Academy of Medicine of New York. During the same year, he was granted the title of pasha, the highest honour bestowed on a civilian in Egypt. In 1943, the Royal College of Surgeons of England elected Sir Winston Churchill, Chiang Kai-shek and Professor Naguib Mahfouz as honorary fellows of the college, the highest honour the Royal College can bestow. As Mahfouz could not make it to London because of lack of transport during World War II, the Royal College of Surgeons Council unusually enough conferred the degree on Naguib Mahfouz in Cairo. On 1 July 1947, the Royal Society of Medicine of England bestowed its honorary fellowship upon Professor Naguib Mahfouz together with Sir Alexander Fleming, the discoverer of Penicillin, and an atomic scientist. During the same year, Mahfouz was also granted the honorary fellowship of the Royal Society of Gynaecology and Obstetrics of Edinburgh. Naguib Mahfouz was granted the medal of education as well as the King Farouk's prize for medical sciences in 1951. In 1956, The Royal College of Obstetricians and Gynaecologists invited Mahfouz to deliver the Fletcher Shaw Memorial Lecture, an honour only conferred on fellows of the college "whose research would have contributed to noticeable progress in obstetrics and gynaecology". So many applications to attend came in, that the venue of the lecture had to be moved from the college's lecture hall to the Royal Society of Medicine in London. In 1960, President Gamal Abdel Nasser granted Mahfouz the First Class Order of Merit and the State Prize of Distinction for Science. President Anwar Sadat subsequently granted him the highest accolade post-humously.

== Private life ==
Naguib Mahfouz was married to Fayka Azmi in 1911. They had a son and four daughters. He died at the age of 92 on 25 July 1974.
