= Coptic Hospital =

- Egyptian Government
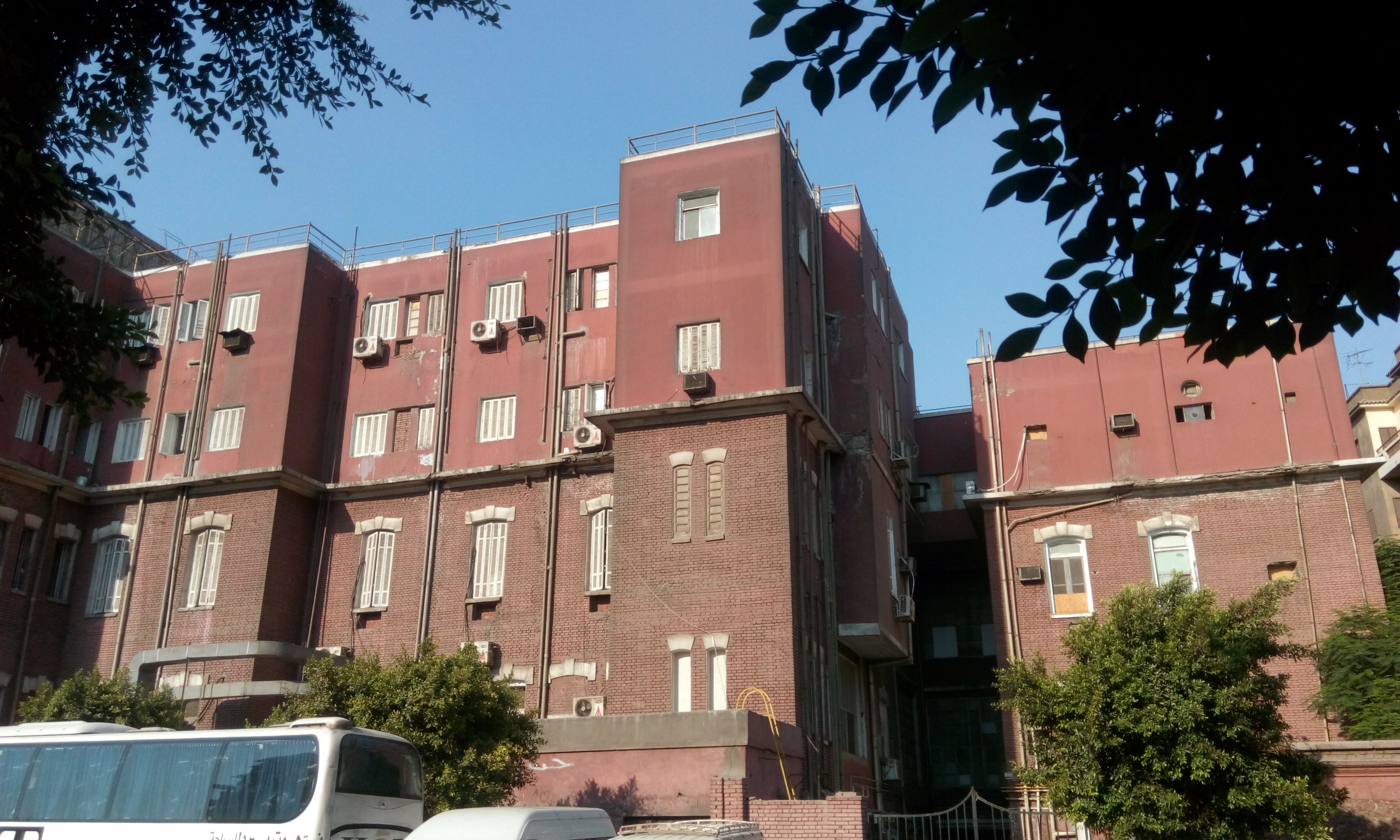

Geography
- Location: Cairo, Egypt
- Coordinates: 30°3′47″N 31°15′9″E

Organisation
- Type: General

History
- Founded: 1920

Links
- Lists: Hospitals in Egypt

1. The Coptic Hospital (Arabic:المستشفى القبطي) is a hospital in Cairo, Egypt.

== History ==
The idea of establishing a hospital by the Coptic Orthodox Church started in the late 19th century; in the 1920s in a group of Coptic doctors met together on a regular basis for fellowship and discussion. This group included El Menyawi Pasha, Naguib Pasha Mahfouz, Guergis (Guirguis) Pasha Antoun and many others. This group founded the charity al-Jam'iyyat al-Khayriyyah al-Kibtiyyah Kubra (the Coptic Philanthropic Society). They established the hospital on Ramses Street in Azbakeya and owned other properties (both land and commercial apartment buildings). Naguib Pasha Mahfouz worked in it. Guergis Pasha Antoun ran the hospital for many years. (marvin, 2015).

Cairo Coptic Hospital was nationalised in the 1960s and is currently run by a government body. The Coptic Church continued to give the name to its hospitals outside Egypt.

=== Kenya Branch ===
The Kenya Coptic hospital Branch is founded by Bishop Paul,the Branch of the hospital is located at Nairobi.

== Services ==
- Imaging & Diagnostics
- Dental & Cosmetic Procedures
- Critical & Outpatient Care
- Surgical Specialties
- Maternal & Pediatric Care

== Medical director ==
The chief medical director of the hospital is Mina Aref for the Egypt branch.
