= Sharm International Hospital =

Geography
- Location: Sharm El Sheikh, Egypt
- Coordinates: 27.8816°N 34.2998°E

Organisation
- Type: General

Links
- Lists: Hospitals in Egypt

Sharm International Hospital in Sharm El Sheikh in Egypt, it serves locals and tourists.

Former president of Egypt Hosni Mubarak was admitted for health problems.
