= South Sinai Hospital =

South Sinai HospitalSouth Sinai Hospital

Geography
- Location: Sharm El Sheikh, Egypt
- Coordinates: 27.861453°N 34.304460°E

Services
- Emergency department: Yes

Helipads
- Helipad: No

Links
- Website: southsinaihospital.com
- Lists: Hospitals in Egypt

South Sinai Hospital, is a private hospital in Sharm El Sheikh, Egypt, that serves both locals and tourists in the South Sinai Governorate.

It is one of the largest hospitals in the area, and covers most major specialties.
