= Theodor Bilharz =

German physician (1825–1862)

Coordinates: 30°01′N 31°14′E

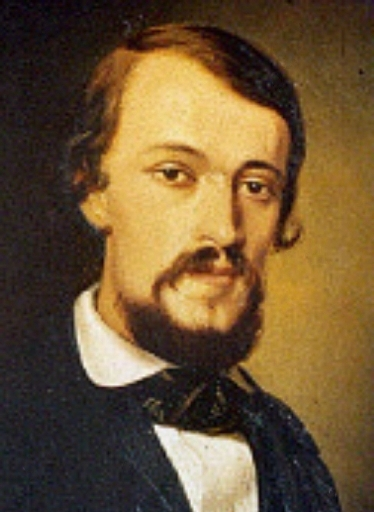
- Born: 23 March 1825; Sigmaringen, Germany
- Died: 9 May 1862 (aged 37); Cairo, Egypt
- Resting place: Old Cairo
- Citizenship: German
- Education: University of Tübingen
- Known for: Discovery of bilharzia and Schistosoma haematobium
- Scientific career
- Fields: Medicine; Parasitology
- Workplaces: University of Freiburg; Qasr El Eyni Hospital
- Author abbrev. (zoology): Bilharz

Theodor Maximilian Bilharz (23 March 1825 – 9 May 1862) was a German medical doctor who made pioneering discoveries in the field of parasitology. His contributions led to the foundation of tropical medicine. He is best remembered as the discoverer of the blood fluke Schistosoma haematobium, the causative parasite of bloody urine (haematuria) known since ancient times in Egypt. The parasite, as the cause of bladder cancer, is declared by the International Agency for Research on Cancer as Group 1 carcinogen. The infection is known by an eponymous term bilharzia or bilharziasis, as well as by schistosomiasis.

Bilharz was born and educated in Sigmaringen, Hohenzollern-Sigmaringen, Germany. After graduating in natural science and philosophy from the Albert-Ludwigs-Universität in 1845, he earned a medical degree from the University of Tübingen in 1849. In 1850, he followed his former teacher Wilhelm Griesinger to Egypt to work at the Qasr El Eyni Hospital in Cairo. He became the first autopsy performer there. From autopsies of children, he observed a variety of helminth parasites and discovered the tapeworm Hymenolepis nana and the flatworm Heterophyes heterophyes in 1851. Early in that year he found a male worm from a dead soldier. As a novel worm with two mouth-like suckers, he named it Distomum haematobium, the description of which was published by his mentor Karl Theodor Ernst von Siebold in 1852. He further discovered that it was the eggs and not the flukes that caused the disease. He also unknowingly discovered another related blood fluke, later identified as Schistosoma mansoni, the most prevalent human helminth.

While he was professor of anatomy at the Qasr El Eyni Medical School (later part of the University of Cairo), he contracted typhoid fever or typhus at Massawa during an expedition organised by Ernest II, Duke of Saxe-Coburg and Gotha. He died of it at age 37. The United Arab Republic established Theodor Bilharz Research Institute in his honour in 1962.

== Early life and education ==
Theodor Bilharz was born in Sigmaringen, Hohenzollern-Sigmaringen, Germany. His father Josef Antony Bilharz (1788–1877), a councilor of the exchequer, was an advisor to the Prince Karl Anton of Hohenzollern. His mother Elisa Fehr (1800–1889) was from a Swiss family of Zollikhofer. He was the eldest of nine children, four of who died at infancy. He studied at the local school in Sigmaringen and completed his secondary education (Fürstlich Sigmaringer Gymnasium) in 1843 with the highest score. He developed keen interest in geology, biology and poetry. His surviving poem Die Trane des Seraphs (The Travels of the Seraphs) was composed during his school days. He scored the highest in his class in Latin, Greek and Hebrew. At age 14, he wrote a drama and translated an ancient comic epic Battle of the Frogs and Mice (Batrachomyomachia). He soon developed a passion for natural science mainly from the library and specimens he inherited from his great uncle Kaspar Zollikofer von Altenklingen, a reputed Swiss biologist.

In the winter semester of 1843, Bilharz entered the Albert-Ludwigs-Universität (University of Freiburg) in Freiburg im Breisgau and took up natural science and philosophy. After completing his degree in 1845, he followed his anatomy teacher Friedrich Arnold to the University of Tübingen where he enrolled in medicine. In 1846, he won the medical faculty's prize competition for his dissertation on "The microscopic characters of the blood of invertebrate animals." With the prize money he bought a compound microscope (Oberhaus microscope) that he used throughout his career. He became closely associated with Wilhelm Griesinger, a neurologist and psychiatrist who was working as an internist at Tübingen.

Bilharz passed the state exam in 1849 to obtain a license as medical doctor. Some sources state that he graduated in 1848, and was awarded the medical degree without requiring an examination due to his superior performance. This information may not be reliable as better biographical sources say he passed the exam in 1849. After graduation, he was immediately appointed as an assistant to Karl Theodor Ernst von Siebold at the University of Freiburg. Von Siebold became his major influence in parasitology and later discoveries. Bilharz initially planned to do parasitology research in South America as he said: "The path to become a professor maybe shorter via America than via Tübingen." The next year, a recently appointed professor of anatomy at Freiburg, Georg Ludwig Kobelt recruited him as his prosector.

== Career and achievements ==
In 1850, Wilhelm Griesinger, then at the University of Kiel, was appointed by Abbas I of Egypt, Wāli (governor or viceroy) of Egypt and Sudan, to head medical services in Egypt. He responded to the Wāli that he would accept the appointment only if his former student Theodor Bilharz was appointed as his assistant. Bilharz was still waiting for his medical certificate, and recounted that he could not sleep the night he received the official appointment out of excitement. Griesinger was to hold three positions such as Director of both Qasr El Eyni Hospital and its medical school (later part of the University of Cairo), President of the Sanitary Council and personal physician to the Wāli. Von Siebold wrote of his recommendation to Bilharz's father saying, "I can't help it to speak out the wish that the stay of your good Theodor may be a credit to him and to science... I won't believe anything else than that a longer stay in wonderful Egypt would be excellently used by your son. God may save his health."

Griesinger and Bilharz left on 25 May and reached Alexandria on 18 June. Bilharz held the position of senior consultant for the department of internal medicine, and also enlisted in the military where he was given the rank of lieutenant colonel (Kaimakam). As an authorised autopsy performer, it was an ideal assignment for Bilharz because autopsy was generally opposed by religious and traditional establishments at the time. Bilharz thereby became the first person to legally perform autopsies in Egypt as the first chief of surgery. While in charge of autopsy between 1850 and 1852, he performed more than 400 operations.

In 1852, Griesinger left Egypt and Bilharz became professor of medicine in his place. The next year, Bilharz was appointed as chief surgeon of internal diseases. When Abbas I died in 1854, his successor Mohamed Sa'id Pasha, a Francophone and a Francophile, dismissed all Germans from official services. Bilharz was replaced by Antoine Clot (known in Egypt as Clot Bey) from Marseille. The German consul however managed to persuade the viceroy to reinstate Bilharz because of his scientific contributions. In 1856, Clot allowed Bilharz to become professor of anatomy. But he exchanged it with the position of professor of descriptive anatomy the same year. He also took charge as medico-legal adviser to the Egyptian government.

=== Helminthology ===
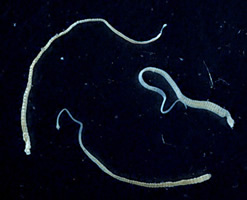
Dwarf tapeworm (Hymenolepis nana) adults

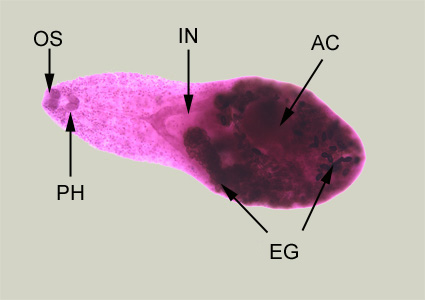
Heterophyes heterophyes adult fluke. OS – oral sucker, PH – pharynx, IN – intestine, AC – ventral sucker or acetabulum, UT – uterus.

Bilharz in his first year in Egypt found and reported different human parasites including Ancylostoma duodenale, Ascaris lumbricoides, Trichuris trichiura, pinworm (Oxyuris), pork tapeworm (Taenia solium), dog tapeworm (Echinococcus granulosus), hookworms (Ancylostoma and Necator) and guinea-worm (Dracunculus medinensis). His first major discovery was that of the tapeworm Hymenolepis nana that he recovered from the small intestine of an Egyptian boy in Cairo in 1851. Von Siebold gave the original name as Taenia nana in 1852. In 1851, Bilharz also discovered a novel intestinal flatworm from an infected child in Cairo. Von Siebold named it Distoma heterophyes in 1852. English biologist Thomas Spencer Cobbold created a better generic name Heterophyes in 1866; thus, the parasite became Heterophyes heterophyes. Bilharz's specimen became the first known helminth in the family Heterophyidae.

==== Discovery of bilharzia and Schistosoma haematobium ====
Ancient Egyptians had recorded urinary disease which can be attributed to S. haematobium infection. 16th-century BCE medical papyri mention the disease as aaa that indicates symptoms of urinary bilharzia. Mummies of 5,000 years old have been found to contain the parasite eggs. The French army physician Adrien-Jacques Renoult reported the disease as haematurea (bloody urine) in 1808. Napoleon's army in the late 18th century called Egypt as "the land of menstruating men." This is because of the high prevalence of the disease that severely affected the French army. The cause of the disease was never known.

In 1851, during an autopsy, Bilharz discovered an obvious worm from the portal vein connecting the urinary tract of a dead soldier. It was the first time anyone had seen a parasitic worm that lived inside a blood vessel. Not really knowing what kind of worm it was, he wrote to his former zoology professor von Siebold at Breslau on 1 May 1851:

As helminths in general and those who attack humans in particular are concerned, I think Egypt is the best country to study them. Nematodes in particular populate the intestines of the indigenous population in unimaginable quantities. It is not unusual to encounter 100 individuals of Strongylus duodenalis [Ancylostoma duodenale], 20–40 Ascaris, 10–20 Trichocephalus [Trichuris trichiura] and close to 1000 Oxyuris. My attention soon turned to the liver and associated structures; in the blood from v. portae I found a number of long, white worms that with the naked eye appeared to be nematodes. A look in the microscope revealed an excellent Distomum with flat body and a twisted tail. These are a few leaves of a saga as wonderful as the best of Thousand and One Nights – if I succeeded in putting it all together.

He also added an identification puzzle:

[It] had a flat body and a spiral tail at least ten times as long as the body... The tail was a continuation of the flat body of the worm itself, rolled sideways towards the stomach surface in a half canal; the forked blind end of the intestinal canal extended into it very plainly. What then is this animal? In spite of its long tail, it probably cannot be called a cercaria [a fork-tailed larva of trematodes], which is completely different, histologically and morphologically.

As unique among flukes, the schistosomes have two bodies – a female which is like a roundworm and a male which is curled-up fluke – that are combined permanently (a condition called in copula) to make up individual adult worms. Bilharz had discovered a male fluke. He knew it has similarities to other flukes, especially the two mouth-like suckers (now called oral sucker or acetabulum and ventral sucker), for which he immediately used the name Distomum, a Greek for two mouthed. But the rolled-up body made him think that it was a roundworm. At the end of May, he found a female specimen from another corpse that was all wrapped up by the same kind of worm he had discovered. It occurred to him that the worm was an extraordinary fluke, exclaiming, "Something more wonderful, a trematode with divided sex." All previously known parasitic flukes were hermaphrodites with both male and female reproductive organs in the same individual, a condition called gonochorism. Describing his observation in a letter to von Siebold on 18 August, he wrote:

You can imagine my surprise when I saw a trematode [fluke] protruding from the frontal opening of the groove and moving back and forth; it was similar in shape as the first, only much finer and more delicate... [The female] was completely enclosed in the groove-shaped half canal of the male posterior, similar to a sword in a scabbard.

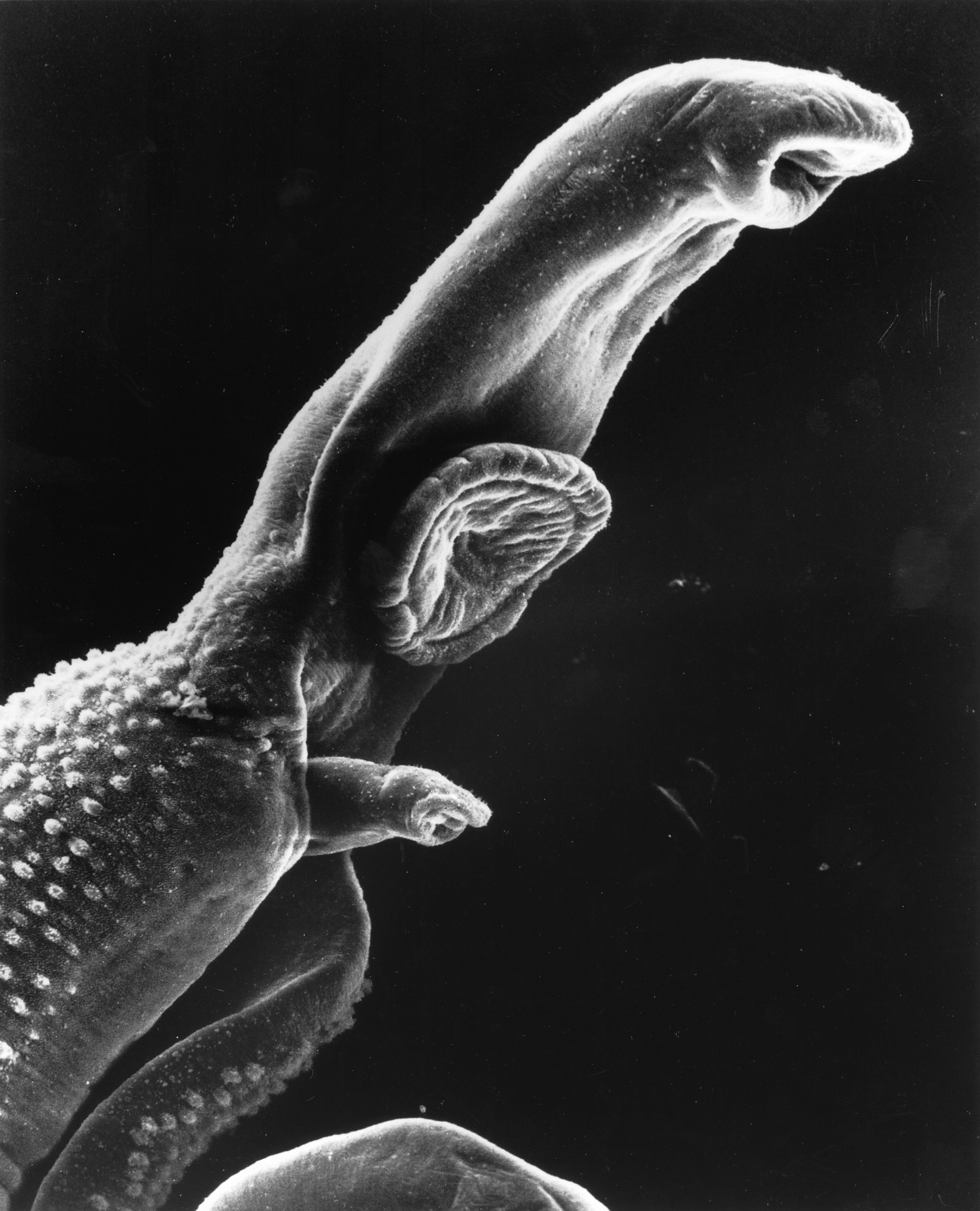
Anterior portion of a blood fluke (Schistosoma). The two mouth-like structures are the oral and ventral suckers of a male. The female is like a roundworm protruding below the ventral sucker of male.

Bilharz was able to find the male fluke rolled itself up to form a canal in which the female resided, and he named the canal as gynaecophoric canal.

By March 1852, Bilharz also found many eggs from the bladders of the fluke-infected individuals, indicating that those were of the parasites. He could not establish what the eggs did to cause the disease and suspected them as the cause of kidney stone (nephrolithiasis) and other kidney problems. Griesinger had thought that the fluke caused dysentery, but Bilharz found that it was responsible for urinary tract diseases including haematuria as well. He made the first vivid diagrammatic description of the worms and the eggs on 1 December 1881 in a letter to von Siebold. In it he gave the full scientific name Distomum haematobium; the specific name referring to the unique habitat of the fluke in the blood vessels. Von Siebold reported the discovery in Zeitschrift für Wissenschaftliche Zoologie, the journal he edited, in 1852. Bilharz then published in the following volume of the same journal the complete description of the parasite structure and the disease it caused. He referred to the disease as "endemic haematuria of warm climates" and the "dysenterische Veränderung des Dickdarms" (dysenteric pathology of the colon). Bilharz then in early 1852 discovered the embryo (now called miracidia; singular, miracidium) developed from the egg in water, and recorded:

[The miracidium] had a long, cylindrical cone-shaped form which was thicker anteriorly and more rounded posteriorly, with a proboscis-like protuberance anteriorly. It was covered completely with rather long cilia.

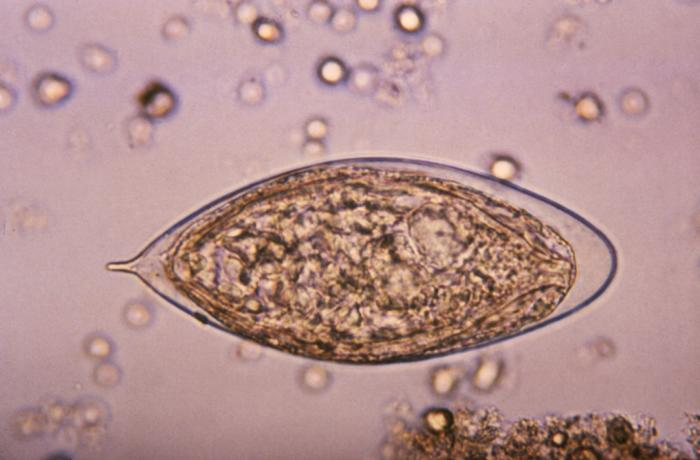
Schistosoma haematobium egg can be identified by its terminal spine.

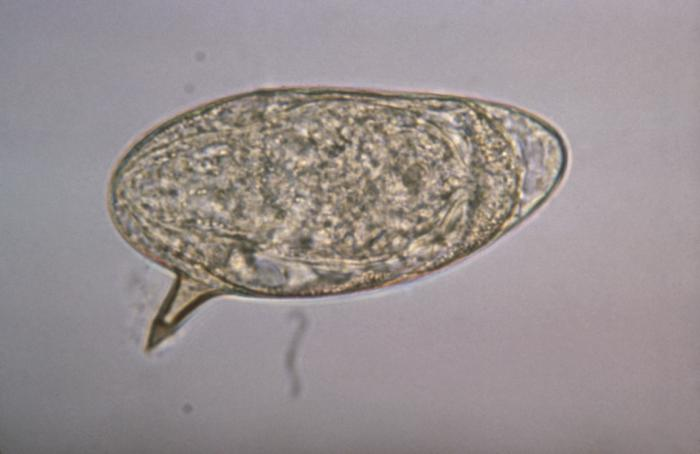
Schistosoma mansoni egg is characterised by a lateral spine.

Although he could not make observation on the further development of the miracidia, his discovery revealed half of the life cycle of the parasite. By then, he established that the disease (its pathology) was caused by the eggs and not the worms themselves. He reported his observations in the journal Wiener Medizinische Wochenschrift in 1856.

However, the generic name was not a good choice. A closely related name Distoma had been introduced by French zoologist Marie Jules César Savigny in 1816 for other animals, the tunicates. Adding to the confusion, Distoma and Distomum had been interchangeably used to describe different species of flukes. Even Distomum haematobium was sometimes written as Distoma haematobium. In 1856, Heinrich Meckel von Hemsbach critically argued that the usage of such names was inappropriate as it was a misnomer for the flukes since these animals do not have two mouths. Writing in his book Mikrogeologie: Ueber die Concremente im thierischen Organismus (Microgeology: About the Accumulations in the Animal Organism), he remarked: "The genus name Distoma should not be used, but be replaced with Billharzia [double l is the original printing mistake]." The parasite thereby became Bilharzia haematobium, and with it von Hemsbach introduced the name of the disease as bilharzia. Not knowing von Hemsbach's publication which had limited circulation at the time, David Friedrich Weinland proposed the name Schistosoma (a Greek term for "split body" reflecting the separation of male and female in an individual) in 1858. After a century of debate and confusion on the name, in 1954, the International Commission on Zoological Nomenclature (ICZN) officially declared Schistosoma haematobium as valid on the ground of priority rule. However, if true priority was to be followed, Bilharzia haematobium should have been adopted.

The disease had been known as bilharzia (or bilharziasis), after the discoverer, the term that is broadly used for all types of infections with different Schistosoma species. In 1949, the World Health Organization adopted the name bilharzia for medical terminology. When ICZN validated the name Schistosoma haematobium in 1954, it specifically recommended that the disease be called bilharziasis. Following the valid scientific name, schistosomiasis became widely used, and the name urinary schistosomiasis is also commonly used to differentiate it from other schistosome infections.`

Towards the end of the 19th century, Cobbold noted as "without question, [S. haematobium is] the most dangerous [of human] parasite[s]." German anatomist, Gustav Fritsch called it "schlimmerer feind der menschheit" ("the worse enemy of humankind"). A series of observations following the initial discovery by a British Surgeon Reginald Harrison in 1889 that S. haematobium causes bladder cancer, the WHO International Agency for Research on Cancer (IARC) declared the fluke as Group 1 carcinogen in 2009. It became the first fully proven carcinogenic organism, and is classified among the neglected tropical diseases.

==== Discovery of Schistosoma mansoni ====
When Bilharz found parasite eggs from infected individuals in March 1852, he noted unique characteristic of schistosome eggs, as each egg has a spine, which he called "pointed appendage." He observed the spiny eggs in the bladder as well as in the intestine. He wrote to von Siebold that some of the eggs were different in having terminal spines while some had lateral spines. Bilharz also noted that the adult flukes were different in anatomy and number eggs they produced. His drawings depicted which were later identified as those of S. mansoni adults.

Until 1902, it was generally believed that S. haematobium produced both lateral and terminal-spine eggs. But a British physician Patrick Manson showed that the lateral-spine eggs were produced only by schistosomes in the intestine. The intestinal flukes were established to be a new species, which Louis Westenra Sambon named Schistosomum mansoni in 1907 in honour of Manson.

=== Electric organs of fish ===
After the discovery of bilharzia, Bilharz researched on the electric organs of the Egyptian electric fish popularly known as thunderfish. Electric fishes had been well known in Egyptian history and commonly depicted in ancient hieroglyphics. For this historical importance, Bilharz considered his research on electric organs more valuable than bilharzia, and published them as preliminary note in 1853 and as a full monograph in 1858. He discovered and made detailed description of the nervous system of electric fishes responsible for producing electric fields.

== Later life and death ==
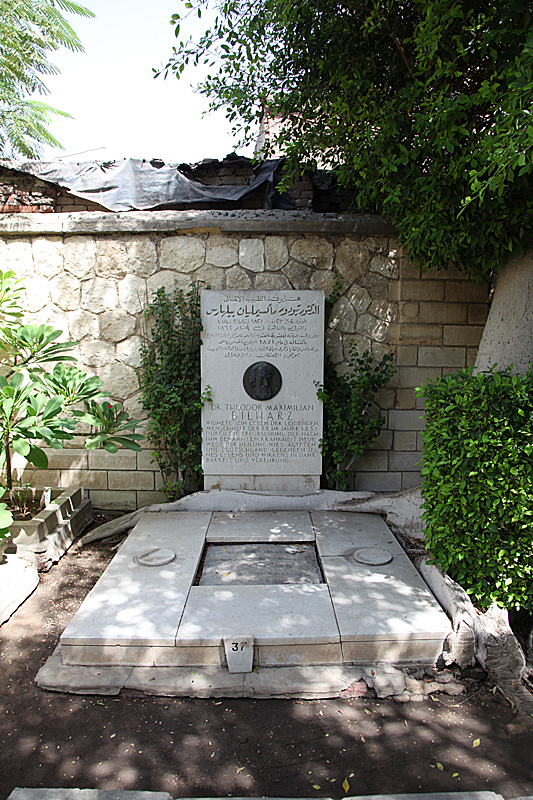
Bilharz's grave in Old Cairo at the German Cemetery

Bilharz returned to Germany in 1858 to visit his hometown and former universities, and giving lectures at Vienna. He made a brief trip to upper Egypt in the winter of 1859 around the Red Sea, where he noticed a good research opportunity. He spent seven months there with his brother, Richard Alexander Alfons, who had just completed his medical degree at the University of Vienna. In 1861, he was transferred to the department of infectious disease (syphilis and skin infections). Ernest II, Duke of Saxe-Coburg and Gotha, requested him to work as personal physician to the Duchess on an expedition around the Red Sea. With research in mind, Bilharz accompanied the Duchess in early 1862. While staying at Massawa he contracted typhoid fever or typhus (reports are contradictory) and became seriously ill. When he returned to Egypt, he was in terminal condition and died on 6 May 1862, at the age of 37.

British parasitologist and biographer, Harry Arnold Baylis wrote of Bilharz's death: "No one, probably, had ever been more universally or more sincerely mourned in the European colony in Cairo." Richard Alexander Alfons also lamented that "The plan [for his career], to further medical research by natural scientific methods, had failed."

Bilharz's works and grave remained largely forgotten until the first International Congress of Tropical Medicine and Hygiene held in Cairo in 1928. The meeting revealed the importance of bilharzia and his name became at the forefront of medicine, his grave was rediscovered by a search party soon after the conference. His grave is in Old Cairo next to that of Hans Eisele (1912–1967), a Nazi concentration camp doctor, who was convicted by the US military court for crime against humanity.

== Legacy ==
- Bilharzia or bilharziasis is another term for schistosomiasis, and is still used in technical publications, as well as by official organizations like the World Health Organization and Centers for Disease Control and Prevention.
- The Theodor Bilharz Research Institute was established by the United Arab Republic in 1962 at Giza.
- The crater Bilharz on the Moon was named after him.
