= Dar Al Fouad =

Dar Al Fouad Hospital

Geography
- Location: Giza, Egypt

Organisation
- Care system: Private
- Type: Academic
- Affiliated university: Cleveland Clinic of the United States

Services
- Standards: JCI accreditation
- Beds: 141

History
- Founded: 1999

Links
- Website: daralfouad.org
- Lists: Hospitals in Egypt

Dar Al-Fouad (Arabic: دار الفؤاد, lit. 'The House of the Heart') is a hospital in Giza, Egypt, on the outskirts of Cairo. It offers cardiothoracic surgery, cardiology, oncology, organ transplant, and orthopedic departments.

Dar Al Fouad Hospital (DAFH) provides medical and surgical care to patients. DAFH also collaborates with medical institutions, such as the American Cleveland Clinic.

DAFH's top medical care and hospital management was recently granted accreditation by the Joint Commission International (JCI). The hospital was founded in 1999.

== Projects ==
Dar Al Fouad is rapidly expanding throughout the region in order to serve additional communities. Projects are underway in Egypt (Nasr City), Kuwait, Saudi Arabia (Jeddah, Riyadh), Libya, Sudan, Oman, Abu Dhabi and Bahrain. In addition, Dar Al Fouad is conducting a feasibility study on the development of a nursing college in Egypt.

== See also ==
- List of hospitals in Egypt
