= Al Nasr Hospital =

Al Nasr Hospital (El Nasr Hospital, An Nasr Hospital) may refer to several places:

- Al Nasr Hospital, Helwan, Egypt
- Al-Nasr Children's Hospital, Gaza City, Palestine
- Al-Nasr Hospital, Dhale, Yemen
- Nasser Hospital Ibb, Yemen
- Al-Nasr Hospital in Kirkuk, Iraq
- Al-Nasr Hospital, Oman
- El Nasr Children's Specialized Hospital, Port Said, Egypt
