= Al Mashhad Media =

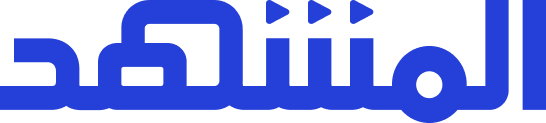
- Country: United Arab Emirates

Ownership
- Key people: Tony Khalife

History
- Launched: 2023

Links
- Website: almashhad.com

Al Mashhad Media (Arabic: المشهد) is a pan-regional news and infotainment multi-media platform, led by Lebanese media personality and presenter Tony Khalife. It is based in Dubai Studio City, Dubai and is part of Info Arab Media organization.

== History ==
Al Mashhad Media (in Arabic means "The Scene Media") was launched in January 2023 with a focus on providing varied content for audiences across the MENA region by mixing television and digital broadcasting. It presents content from across the Arab region and worldwide via multiple platforms.

In May 2023 the platform reached 3 million followers on its social media. In November of the same year, Al Mashhad Media became Best Studio of The Year in the Broadcast Pro Awards.

On 29 November, during a short ceasefire after the withdrawal of Israeli occupation forces from the area, Al Mashhad TV journalist Mohammed Hamed Balousha managed to enter Al-Nasr Children's Hospital in Gaza-City and witnessed a scene of decomposing bodies of babies who were forcefully left behind during Israeli military evacuations. On 14 December 2023, Balousha was targeted by a sniper and shot injured while reporting on the war from northern Gaza. Al Mashhad's Gaza correspondent was honored in the 2024 CAEL awards in Dubai as a result of this coverage.

On 14 December 2024, Balousha was killed in a direct Israeli drone strike. Al Mashhad TV said it considered the attack deliberate.

In March of 2025, Al Mashhad Media reached 20 million followers on social media, providing ongoing breaking news coverage of events all around the world, including Gaza war, Sudan war, Egyptian presidential election, COP28, Jordan Royal Wedding, Syrian and Turkey earthquake, Lebanon crisis, and Turkish elections.

== Overview ==
Al Mashhad is a news and infotainment multi-media platform headed by the journalist Tony Khalife and a group of investors. Al Mashhad is focused on audiences throughout the Middle East and North Africa region. The platform programs include political, social, entertainment, economic, and sports news, as well as a group of talk shows.

Al Mashhad Media team consists of multinational, multicultural, and multilingual specialists from the media and news industry, including journalists and media professionals from other media channels.

=== Al Mashhad news ===
Al Mashhad Media delivers its content on TV and various digital platforms, including website, VOD, TV and mobile applications. Al Mashhad's digital platform uses AI technology to provide viewers with preferred types of content. Content is produced and curated to be compatible with all social media and digital platforms.

=== Al Mashhad Media Programs ===
Al Mashhad Media presents a group of programs broadcast simultaneously on its TV channel and digital platforms. All of Al Mashhad's programs and content are free-to-air. They are also available on OSN boxes, Etisalat, Du, and Cablevision.

== Operations ==
The company is headquartered in Dubai and has an office in Egypt and correspondents stationed across the globe. It employs about 300–500 people. Tony Khalife is the general manager of the company.
