= National Cancer Institute (Egypt) =

Egyptian research institute

National Cancer Institute المعهد القومي للأورام
- Type: Public
- Established: 1969
- Parent institution: Cairo University
- Dean: Prof. Dr. Mohamed Abdelmoaty Samra
- Location: Kasr Al Eini Street, Fom El Khalig, Cairo - Egypt, Cairo, Egypt
- Campus: Cairo
- Website: www.NCI.cu.edu.eg

The National Cancer Institute of Egypt (Arabic : المعهد القومي للأورام) is an organization dedicated to treatment, management and developing a cure to cancer.

== Breast Cancer Hospital ==
Breast Cancer Hospital located in the first settlement. A suburb in New Cairo, is affiliated with the National Cancer Institute, Cairo University. The building was allocated by the state in 2010 after an increase in the number of women attending the institute, the process of operating and receiving patients began in 2013 to specialize in "Breast tumors, Radiation therapy and Mammography”. The hospital receives more than 250 patients per day and includes 80 beds, 3 operating rooms, intensive care beds. The hospital provides its services to all patients free of charge and receives all cases from all governorates at any stage of treatment.

== NCI Journal (JENCI) ==
Produced and hosted on behalf of the National Cancer Institute, Cairo University, the Journal of the Egyptian National Cancer Institute aims at publishing original articles related to all fields of cancer in order to disperse up-to-date information to all medical personnel interested the cancer-related fields such as basic, applied and clinical cancer research.
