= Theodor Bilharz Research Institute =

Egyptian research institute

Coordinates: 30°05′38″N 31°13′24″E

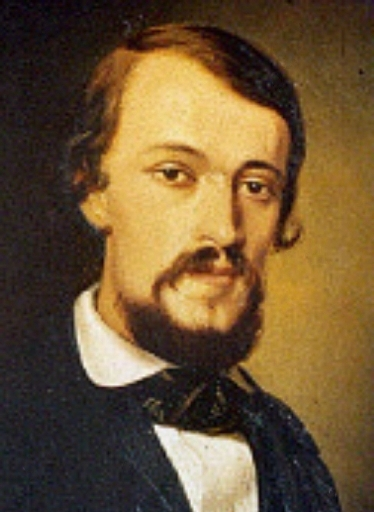
Theodor Bilharz.

The Theodor Bilharz Research Institute is located in Giza, Egypt.

Theodor Bilharz was a German scientist who discovered, in autopsy material at Kasr El Aini Hospital, the causative agent of haematuria: Schistosoma worm, during his work in Egypt in 1851. The bilhariziasis disease was named after him.

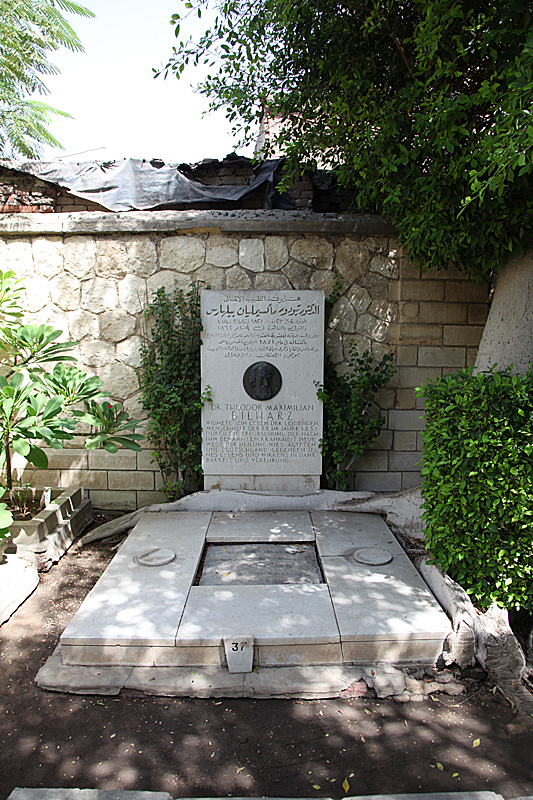
Bilahrz tomb in old Cairo German Cemetery.

The idea of initiating the institute was elaborated in 1960 via high council of science, owing to the magnitude of schistosomiasis problem in Egypt specially in the rural population and its impact on the socioeconomic life. The objective of the institute was to tackle this diseases from all its aspects : control, diagnosis and management.

In 1960, Ahmed Hafez Mousa, the real originator of the institute and one of the world's pioneers in the field of Tropical Medicine was charged to fulfill this idea. He appointed the Tropical Medicine Department at Kasr El Aini, Faculty of Medicine a preliminary location for a small nuclear start of this project. This was followed by the establishment of a "Laboratory for Schisosomiasis Research" in the chemistry building of the National Research Center.

In April 1962, the foundation stone of the institute was implemented at Warak El Hader's village in Giza governorate. Meanwhile, the building of the institute was constructed by Egyptian Government, the laboratories and hospital were equipped through an agreement between the governments of Federal Republic of Germany and Egypt in 1964. The TBRI was built on 25,000 m2 formed of four main buildings in front of the west bank of the Great River Nile in Giza governorate.

In 1977 The institute construction was accomplished, and opened for public, headed by Ali Zain El-Abdeen. in 1979. Ahmad Algarim became the head of the institute, and until 1987. In 1987, Aly Zain Al- Abdeen headed the institute and till his retirement in 1994.

In 1977, the institute was officially affiliated to the Ministry of Scientific Research By June 1978 the TBRI's laboratories and out-patients clinic were inaugurated. The attached hospital was completed in December 1981, and the official opening was in 1983 according to Presidential Decree No. 58.

The institute which started with 12 research departments and 120 bed hospital became this institution encompassing 20 research departments covering a wide spectrum of academic and clinical specialties divided into six divisions (Clinical Medical Division, clinical Surgical Division, Clinical Laboratory Research Division, Immunology &Therapeutic Evaluation Division, Biochemistry &Medicinal Chemistry Division, Medical Malacology & Environmental Research Division). The 20 departments are: Gastroenterology, Hepatology, Nephrology, Public Health, Radiology., Anaesthesia, Intensive care, Surgery, Urology, Clinical Chemistry, Electron Microscopy, Hematology, Microbiology, Pathology, Immunology, Parasitology, Pharmacology, Biochemistry, Medicinal Chemistry, Environmental Research and Medical Malacology departments. A hospital including free of charge sector (300 beds), economic sector (29 beds) and several specialized units are included: hepatic coma resuscitation, renal dialysis, angiography, urodynamics, laparoscopy, infection control, quality control, medical records and statistics unit, Monoclonal antibody Production Unit, Biotechnology Engineering Production Unit, Snail Research Station (located 25 km from Cairo) and a Field Research Unit (in Gezirat Mohamed village) for conducting field work, in the scope to tackle the disease of schistosomiasis and the emerged health problems of viral hepatitis.

== Mission and Research Strategy ==
The mission of TBRI is targeted towards the control, the diagnosis and management of endemic diseases and their complications especially those affecting the liver, the gastrointestinal and the urinary tracts, mainly as result of schistosomiasis and viral hepatitis, this is to meet the social, economic and technological needs of Egypt and the regional area. The Institute adopts an integrated strategy based on six research programs that can cope with and fulfill this objective:

- Control of endemic diseases: This program aims at modifying the existing means of control measures and introducing more recent methods to achieve a more effective yet less expensive control scheme without any harmful environmental impact, through the employment of molecular biology in vaccine production and biological control of the parasites and their intermediate hosts. Moreover, studying the role of the community and intensifying its active participation are prerequisites.
- Diagnosis of endemic diseases: This program is directed to the study, assessment and modification of all diagnostic measures utilizing the most advanced technologies. The diagnosis varies from clinical and laboratory techniques to field studies (prevalence, ecological and socioeconomic implications).
- Morbidity changes of endemic diseases: This program aims at studying the pathogenesis and the pathological changes caused by endemic diseases on different body systems.
- Management of endemic diseases: This program evaluates both the current and advanced therapeutic measures and assess their efficacy and side effects. It includes the different medical and surgical management procedures of diseases and their complications. Studies on partial hepatectomy, liver regeneration and transplantation are items of this program.
- Innovation in Applied Medical Sciences

Any innovations or patency in relevant research fields at TBRI are encouraged and supported.

- Quality Management

Development of new strategies for performance appraisal of hospital, out-patient clinics and laboratories. Development of quality-based documentation, database and communication systems or technical and administrative tools at TBRI. Development of quality-based safety systems for patients, personnel and utilized tools at TBRI, and upgrading of human capacity.

In 2025, the Institute has over 3,000 researchers, mainly in the areas of cancer and infectious diseases.

== Hospital Facilities ==
.Theodor Bilharz research Institute Hospital is a tertiary hospital in Waraq El-Hadar, Giza, Egypt.

· Six surgical theatres

.Three ICU units ( 11 beds general medical ICU, 4 beds Surgical post-operative and 12 beds Hepatic ICU)

.240 beds of Hepatology, Nephrology, General Medicine, Urosurgery, General Surgery, Intensive Care Unit.

.Diagnostic Radiology department.

. Interventional Radiology Unit.

· Endoscopic facilities (gastroduodenoscopy, colonoscopy and ERCP) with ultrasonography and Doppler-electrocardiography.

· Laparoscopic facilities for diagnostic and therapeutic purposes.

· Minimal invasive urosurgery utilizing ureterorenoscopy; nephroscope and cystoscope, under fluoroscopic and endo-camera guidance.

· Blood gas monitoring with estimation of serum electrolytes.

· Fluoroscopy guided angio-table.

· Twenty machines for haemodialysis.

. Blood bank and various laboratories

== Nursing School ==
Affiliated to the hospital is a nursing school which graduated 295 students since 1998 up to 2001 with an average of 26 students per year to fulfill the needs of the Institute, the Ministry of health and other health organizations.

In 2021, the Immunology and Therapeutic Evaluation Division at Institute was designated as a WHO Collaborating Center for Schistosomiasis Control for 3 years.
