= Al-Nasr Children's Hospital =

Children's hospital in western Gaza City, Palestine

Coordinates: 31.53326994°N 34.45880663°E

Geography
- Location: Gaza City, Gaza Strip, Gaza, Palestine

Organisation
- Care system: Public
- Type: Children's hospital / Pediatric

Services
- Emergency department: Yes
- Beds: 145

History
- Founded: 1961

Al-Nasr Children's Hospital (Arabic: مستشفى النصر للأطفال) is a government children's hospital located in western Gaza City, Gaza Strip. It is part of the Al-Nasr Medical Complex, and one of the few major pediatric specialty hospitals in northern Gaza.

== History and capacity ==
The hospital was founded in 1961. As of 2021, it had 151 beds and a staff complement of 270 employees, including medical doctors, nurses, and support staff.

== 2023 Israeli bombardement and siege ==
On 10 November 2023, Doctors Without Borders reported that forcefully evacuated medical workers at Al-Nasr Children's Hospital had to leave babies in incubators after the IDF bombed the pediatric hospital. The Israeli soldiers forbade the families from going near the newborns, no one could reach the hospital and ambulances on the road were also targeted.

On 29 November, during a temporary ceasefire after the withdrawal of Israeli occupation forces from the area, Al-Mashhad channel correspondent Mohamed Hamed Balousha managed to enter Al-Nasr Hospital for Children. His video footage showed the aftermath of the hospital's evacuation, with the horrifying scenes of decomposing remains of five premature babies still in their incubators in the intensive care unit, which the IDF prevented from being removed and buried. Balousha was shot and injured by an IDF sniper in 2023 and killed in 2024 by a deliberate drone attack.

The Switzerland-based Euro-Mediterranean Human Rights Monitor was able to 'confirm that it documented the discovery of five infants dead and in a state of decomposition' in a neonatal ward of the Al-Nasr Hospital and called for an international investigation into the responsibility of the Israeli army for leaving 5 infants to die. Euro-Med, which was headed up by former UN Special Rapporteur on the occupied Palestinian territories Richard A. Falk, said that the babies were left to die three weeks earlier after the nursing staff were forcefully made to leave the hospital by the IDF, which attacked the hospital and surrounded it with its tanks. In a testimony the director of Al-Nasr Children's Hospital, Dr. Mustafa Al-Kahlout, stated that he called upon international organizations, including the Red Cross, for help, to save the lives of the five critically ill children, but received no response. Euro-Med confirmed he received no reply. Dr. Mustafa Al-Kahlout mentioned that he informed an Israeli army officer, who had warned them of final evacuation, about the condition of the five children in incubators, confirming that the officer told him that the army was aware of the situation and would take action.

The IDF denied any involvement. In a recording of a phone call between Coordinator of Government Activities in the Territories (COGAT) and a medical official, the IDF official confirmed ambulances would retrieve patients from al-Nasr, but hospital officials stated the ambulances never arrived.

The Red Cross stated that it had received "several requests" for evacuations from hospitals in northern Gaza, but due to security concerns, it was "not involved in any operations or evacuations, nor did teams commit to doing so." The organization also described the footage of deceased children as an "unspeakable tragedy."
