= Cairo =

Capital and largest city of Egypt

Cairo القاهرة
- Capital city
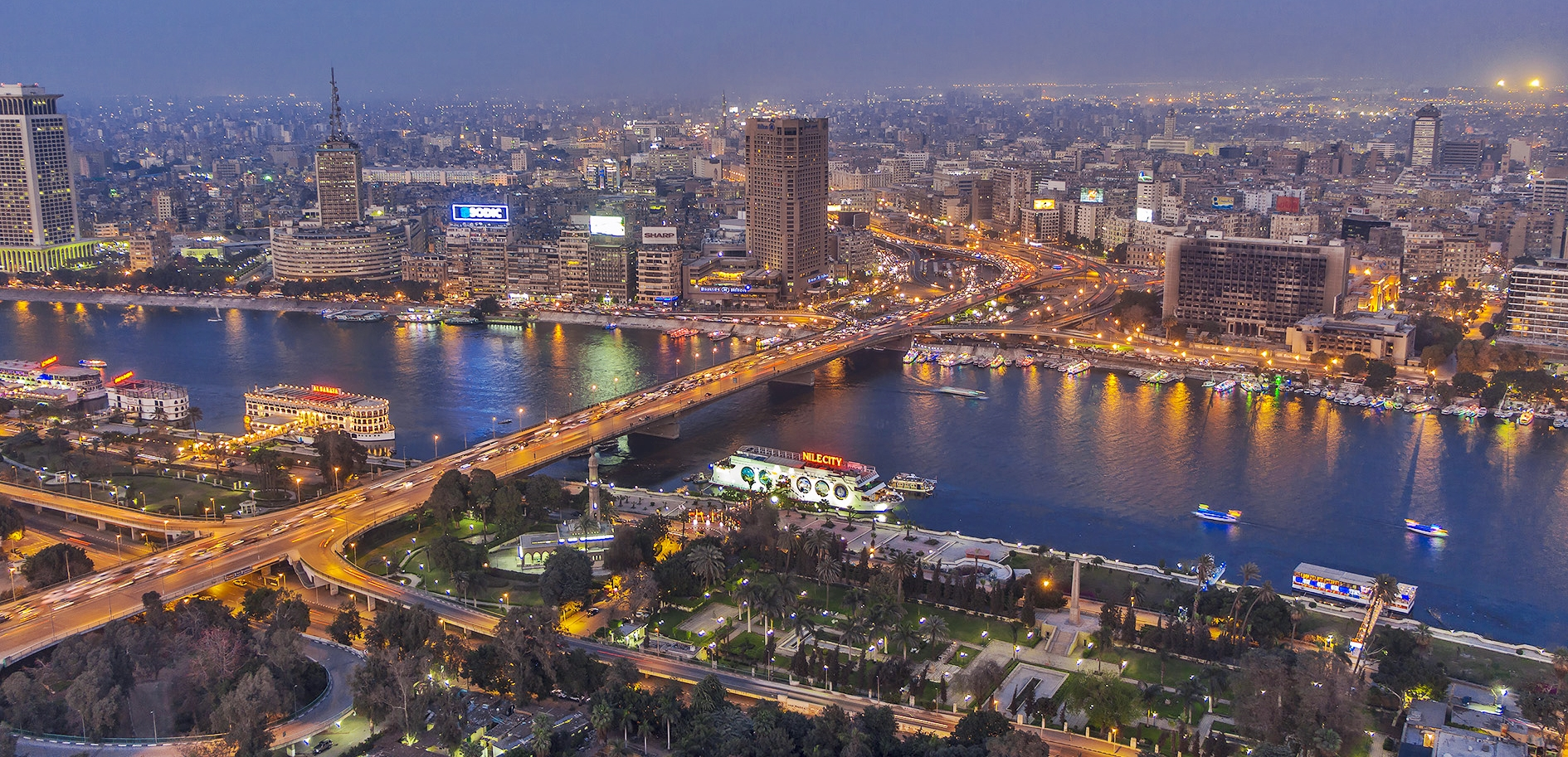
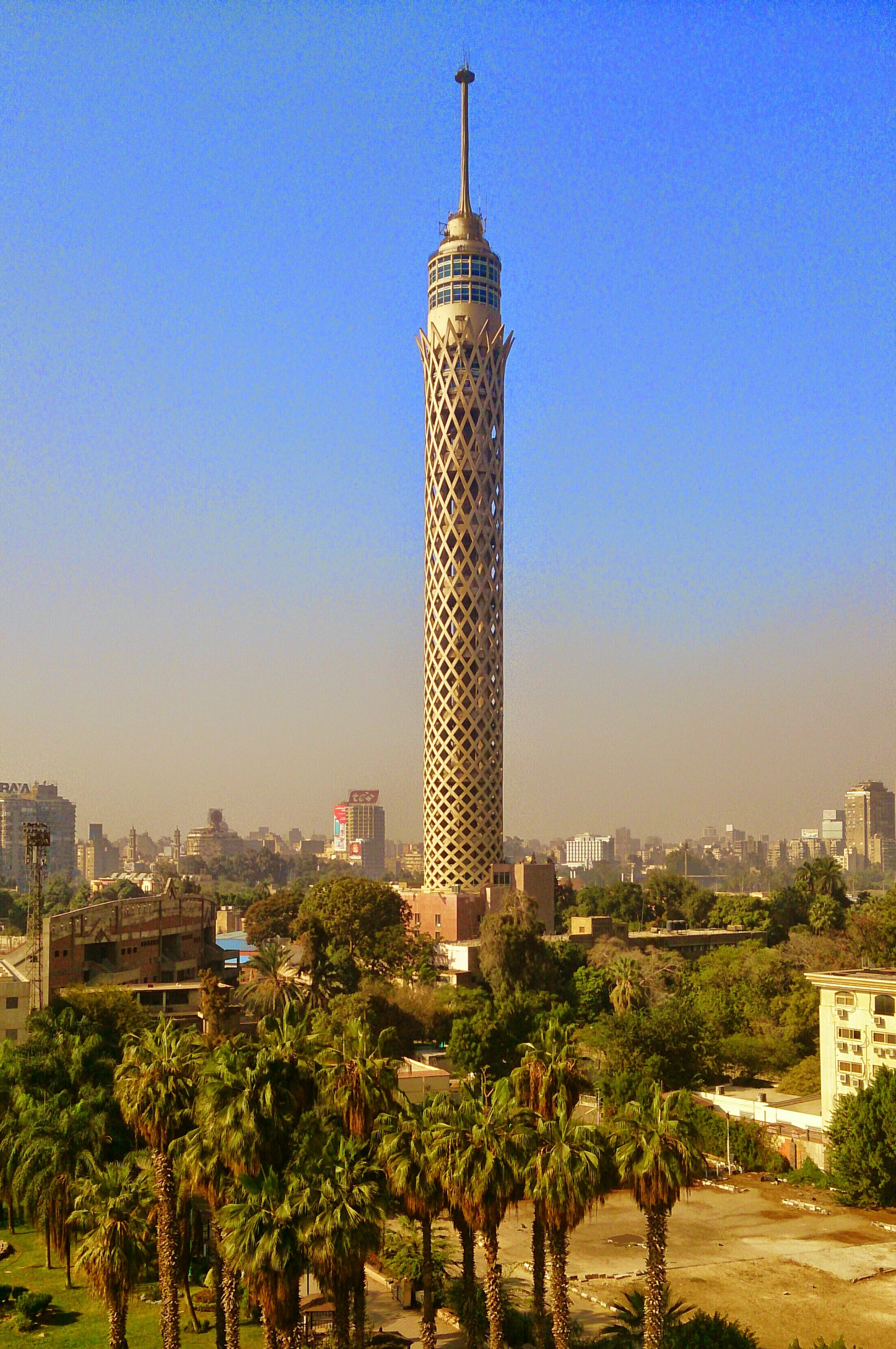
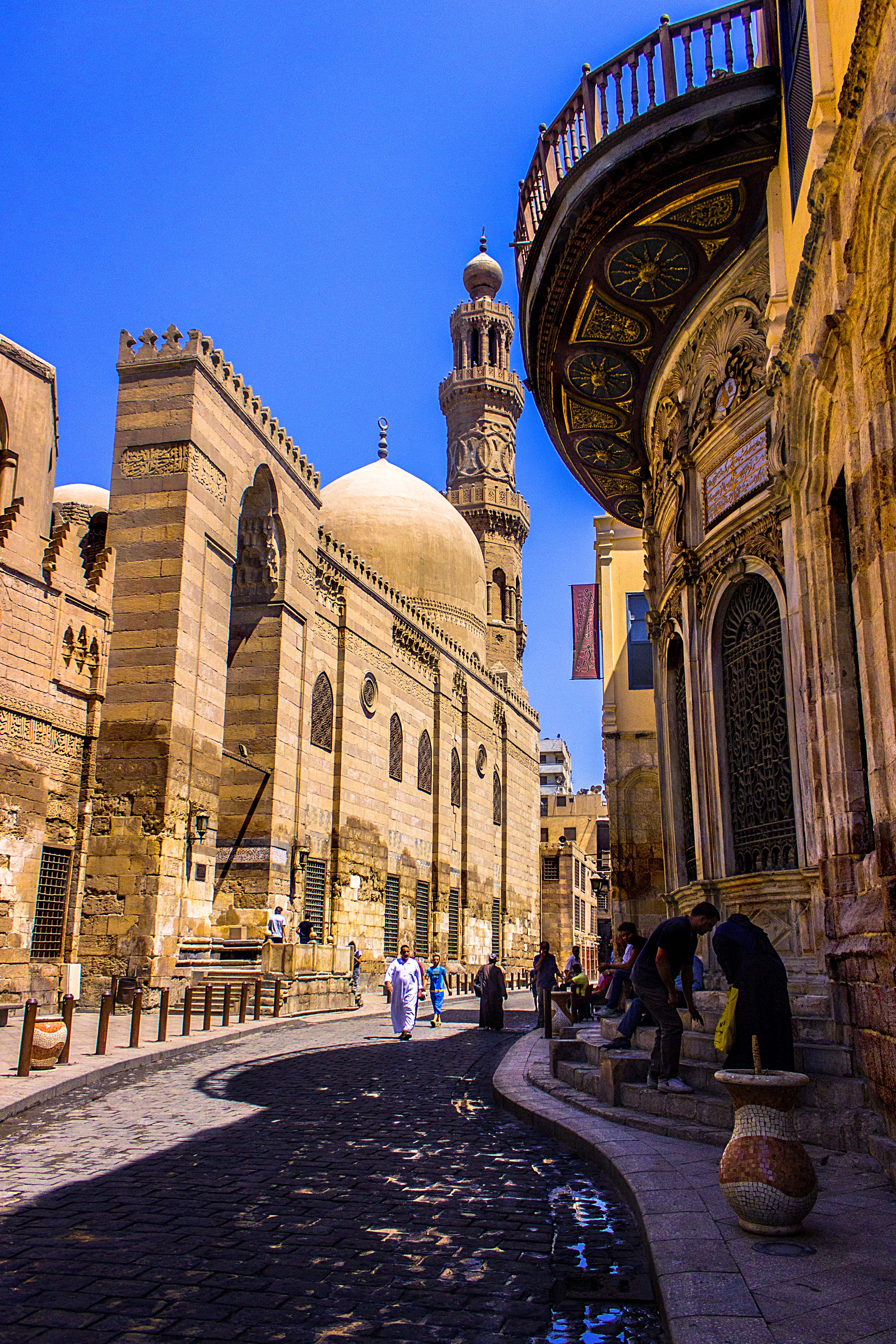
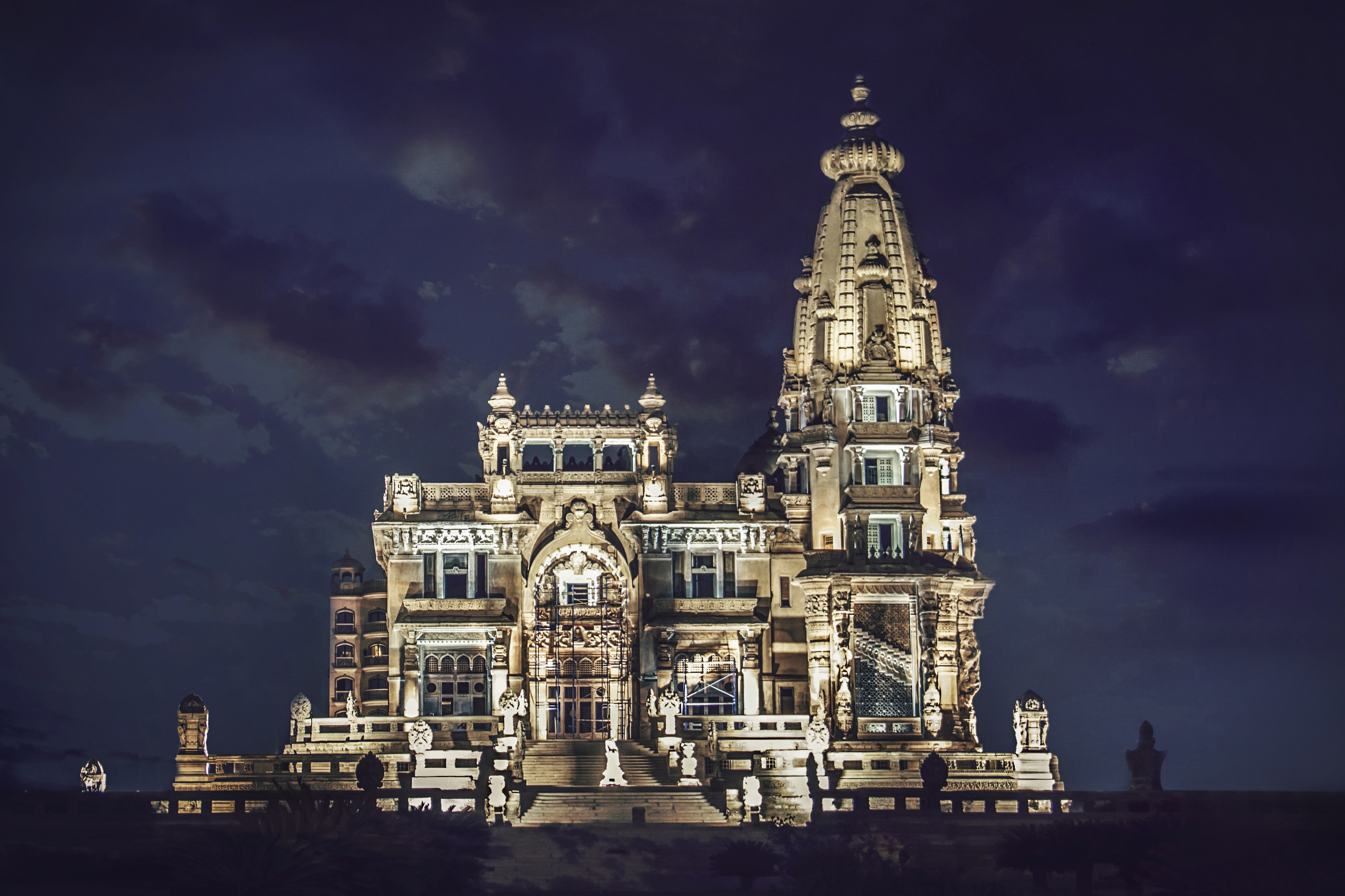
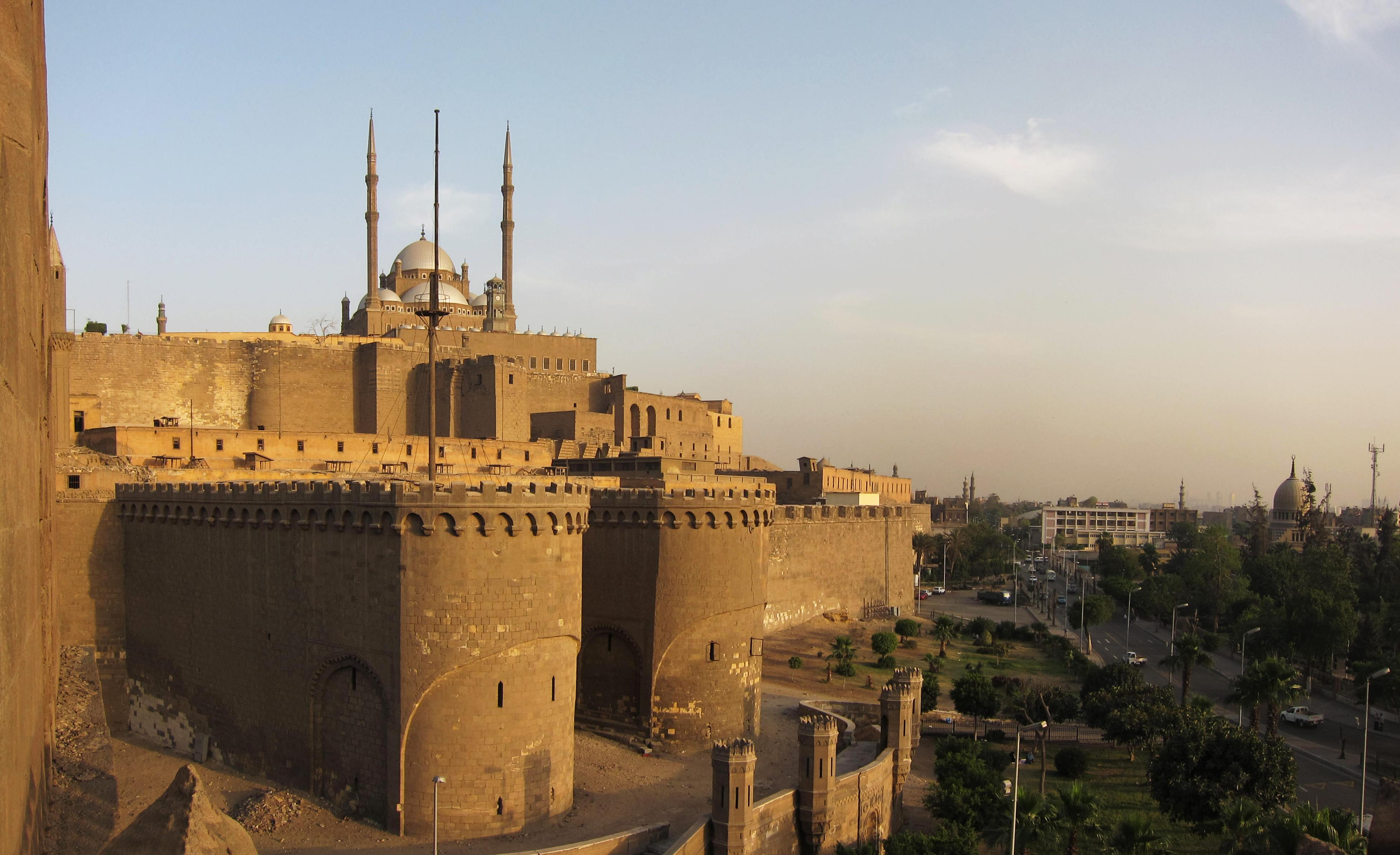
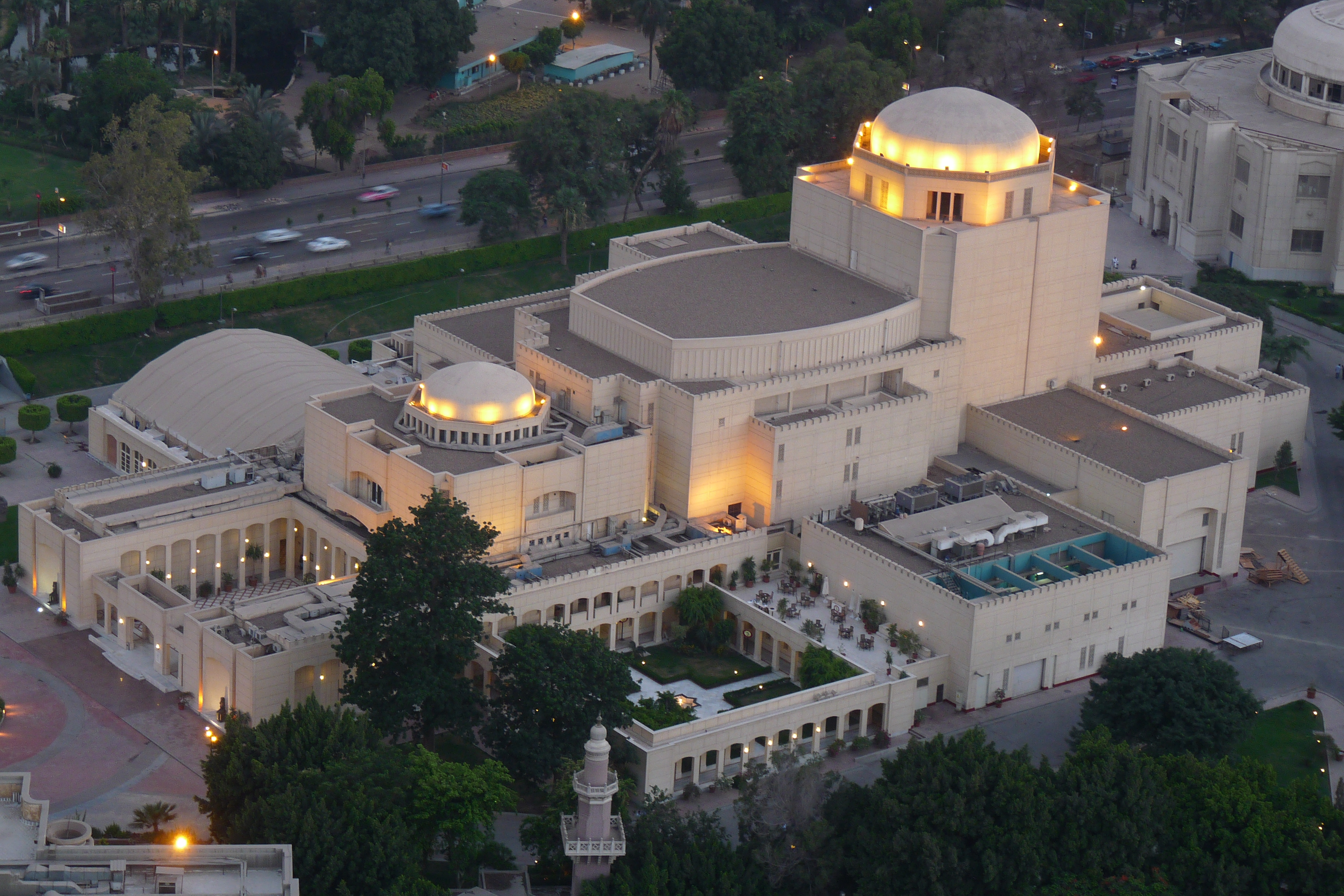
- The Nile, 6th October Bridge and Downtown from Cairo Tower on Gezira Island Ibn Tulun Mosque Cairo Tower Al-Muizz Street Talaat Harb Square Baron Empain Palace Cairo Citadel Cairo Opera House

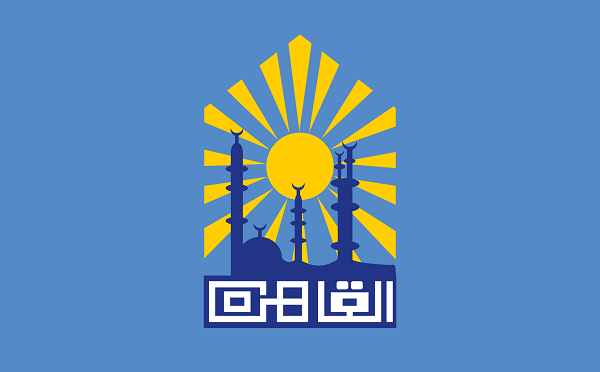
- Flag Emblem
- Nickname: City of a Thousand Minarets
- Interactive map of Cairo
- Location of Cairo within Egypt Cairo (Africa)
- Coordinates: 30°2′40″N 31°14′9″E
- Country: Egypt
- Governorate: Cairo
- First major foundation: 641–642 AD (Fustat)
- Last major foundation: 969; 1057 years ago AD (Cairo)

Government
  - Governor: Ibrahim Saber

Area (Note: Cairo Metropolitan is enlarged to cover all the area within the Governorate limits. Government statistics consider that the whole governorate is urban and the whole governorate is treated like as the metropolitan-city of Cairo. Governorate Cairo is considered a city-proper and functions as a municipality. The city of Alexandria is on the same principle as the city of Cairo, being a governorate-city. Because of this, it is difficult to divide Cairo into urban, rural, subdivisions, or to eliminate certain parts of the metropolitan administrative territory on various theme (unofficial statistics and data).)
  - Capital city: 606 km^{2} (234 sq mi)
  - Metro: 2,744 km^{2} (1,059 sq mi)
- Elevation: 23 m (75 ft)

Population (2023)
  - Capital city: 9,801,536
  - Rank: 1st in Egypt; 1st in Africa
  - Density: 16,200/km^{2} (41,900/sq mi)
  - Metro: 22,200,000
  - Metro density: 8,090/km^{2} (21,000/sq mi)
  - Demonym: Cairene

GDP (nominal, 2024)
  - Metro: $103.6 billion
  - Per capital: $4,604
- Time zone: UTC+2 (EET)
  - Summer (DST): UTC+3 (EEST)
- Area code: (+20) 2
- Website: cairo.gov.eg

UNESCO World Heritage Site
- Official name: Historic Cairo
- Type: Cultural
- Criteria: i, v, vi
- Designated: 1973
- Reference no.: 89

Cairo (Note: /ˈkaɪroʊ/ KY-roh; Arabic: القاهرة, romanised: al-Qāhirah, Egyptian Arabic: [el‿ˈqɑːheɾɑ]) is the capital and largest city of Egypt and the Cairo Governorate. It is home to more than 9.8 million people. The city is also part of the largest urban agglomeration in Africa, the Arab world, and the Middle East. The Greater Cairo metropolitan area is one of the largest in the world by population with over 22 million people. Areas of what would become Cairo were inhabited from pre-dynastic and early-dynastic ancient Egypt c. 6000 years ago, as the Giza pyramid complex and the ancient cities of Memphis and Heliopolis are today within the city.

Located near the Nile Delta, the predecessor city was Fustat. Thereafter, Cairo was founded in 969, and became the official seat and capital of the Fatimid Caliphate in 973. It later superseded Fustat as the main urban centre during the Ayyubid and Mamluk periods (12th–16th centuries). Cairo has since become a longstanding centre of political and cultural life, and is titled "the city of a thousand minarets" for its preponderance of Islamic architecture. Cairo's historic center was awarded World Heritage Site status in 1979. The city is considered a regional center of finance and commerce, academics and the arts, and is home to the Cairo Symphony Orchestra and the Cairo Opera House, while the Academy of Arts provides visual arts education.

Cairo is home to Egypt's oldest university, Al-Azhar University, one of the oldest universities in the world, as well as the oldest and largest film and music industry in Africa and the Arab world. Many international media, businesses, and organizations have regional headquarters in Cairo, such as the headquarters of the Arab League, and the regional offices of the World Health Organization, the Food and Agriculture Organization, the International Civil Aviation Organization, and the United Nations Development Programme.

Cairo is a key global city and, like many other megacities, suffers from high levels of pollution and traffic. The Cairo Metro, opened in 1987, is the oldest metro system in Africa, and ranks amongst the fifteen busiest in the world, with over 1 billion annual passenger rides. The economy of Cairo was ranked first in the Middle East in 2005 by Foreign Policy's Global Cities Index, and first in Africa in 2025 according to the International Monetary Fund, and continues to be a major destination for foreign direct investment (FDI) due to its massive consumer market and strategic location.

== Etymology ==
The name of Cairo is derived from the Arabic al-Qāhirah (القاهرة), meaning 'the Vanquisher' or 'the Conqueror', given by the Fatimid Caliph al-Mu'izz following the establishment of the city as the capital of the Fatimid dynasty. Its full, formal name was al-Qāhirah al-Mu'izziyyah (القاهرة المعزيّة), meaning 'the Vanquisher of al-Mu'izz'. It is also supposedly due to the fact that the planet Mars, known in Arabic by names such as an-Najm al-Qāhir (النجم القاهر, 'the Conquering Star'), was rising at the time of the city's founding.

Egyptians often refer to Cairo as Maṣr (IPA: [mɑsˤɾ]; مَصر), the Egyptian Arabic name for Egypt itself, emphasising the city's importance for the country.

There are a number of Coptic names for the city. Tikešrōmi (Coptic: Ϯⲕⲉϣⲣⲱⲙⲓ Late Coptic: [dikɑʃˈɾoːmi]) is attested in the 1211 text The Martyrdom of John of Phanijoit and is either a calque meaning 'man breaker' (Ϯ-, 'the', ⲕⲁϣ-, 'to break', and ⲣⲱⲙⲓ, 'man'), akin to Arabic al-Qāhirah, or a derivation from Arabic قَصْر الرُوم (qaṣr ar-rūm, "the Roman castle"), another name of Babylon Fortress in Old Cairo. The Arabic name is also calqued as ⲧⲡⲟⲗⲓⲥ ϯⲣⲉϥϭⲣⲟ, "the victor city" in the Coptic antiphonary.

The form Khairon (Coptic: ⲭⲁⲓⲣⲟⲛ) is attested in the modern Coptic text Ⲡⲓⲫⲓⲣⲓ ⲛ̀ⲧⲉ ϯⲁⲅⲓⲁ ⲙ̀ⲙⲏⲓ Ⲃⲉⲣⲏⲛⲁ (The Tale of Saint Verina). Lioui (Ⲗⲓⲟⲩⲓ Late Coptic: [lɪˈjuːj]) or Elioui (Ⲉⲗⲓⲟⲩⲓ Late Coptic: [ælˈjuːj]) is another name which is descended from the Greek name of Heliopolis (Ήλιούπολις). Some argue that Mistram (Ⲙⲓⲥⲧⲣⲁⲙ Late Coptic: [ˈmɪstəɾɑm]) or Nistram (Ⲛⲓⲥⲧⲣⲁⲙ Late Coptic: [ˈnɪstəɾɑm]) is another Coptic name for Cairo, although others think that it is rather a name for the Abbasid province capital al-Askar. Ⲕⲁϩⲓⲣⲏ ([ˈkɑhɪɾi]) is a popular modern rendering of the Arabic name (others being Ⲕⲁⲓⲣⲟⲛ [Kairon] and Ⲕⲁϩⲓⲣⲁ [Kahira]), which is modern folk etymology meaning 'land of sun'. Some argue that it was the name of an Egyptian settlement upon which Cairo was built, but it is rather doubtful as this name is not attested in any Hieroglyphic or Demotic source, although some researchers, like Paul Casanova, view it as a legitimate theory. Cairo is also referred to as Ⲭⲏⲙⲓ (Late Coptic: [ˈkɪmi]) or Ⲅⲩⲡⲧⲟⲥ (Late Coptic: [ˈɡɪpdos]), which means Egypt in Coptic, the same way it is referred to in Egyptian Arabic.

People from Alexandria sometimes informally refer to the city as Cairo (IPA: [ˈkæjɾo]; Egyptian Arabic: كايرو).

== History ==
=== Ancient settlements ===
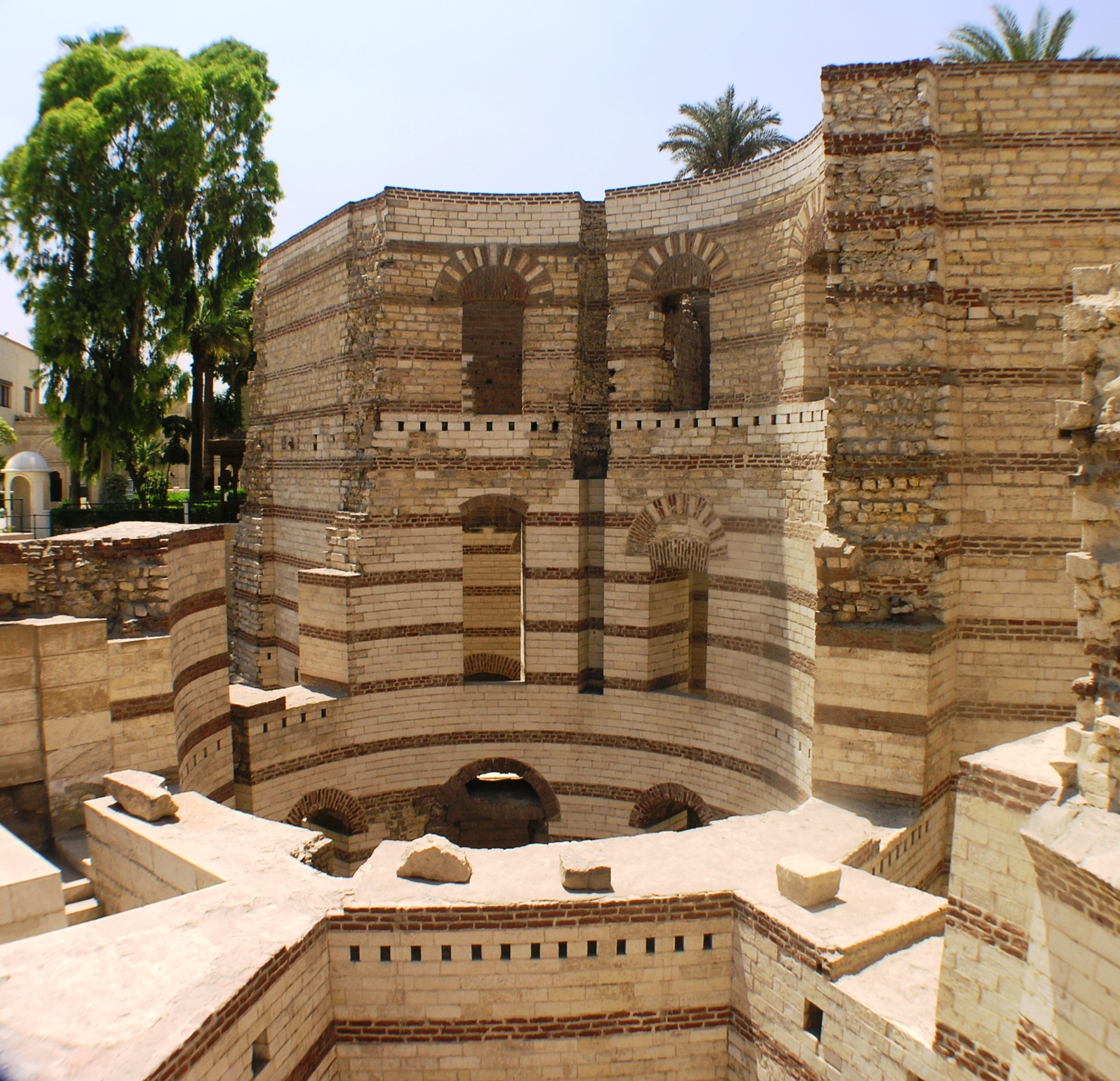
The remains of a circular Roman tower at Babylon Fortress, late 3rd century, in Old Cairo

The area around present-day Cairo had long been a focal point of Ancient Egypt due to its strategic location at the junction of the Nile Valley and the Nile Delta regions (roughly Upper Egypt and Lower Egypt), which also placed it at the crossing of major routes between North Africa and the Levant. Memphis, the capital of Egypt during the Old Kingdom and a major city up until the Ptolemaic period, was located a short distance south west of present-day Cairo. Heliopolis, another important city and major religious centre, was located in what are now the modern districts of Matariya and Ain Shams in northeastern Cairo. It was largely destroyed by the Persian invasions in 525 BC and 343 BC and partly abandoned by the late first century BC.

However, the origins of modern Cairo are generally traced back to a series of settlements in the first millennium AD. Around the turn of the fourth century, as Memphis was continuing to decline in importance, the Romans established a large fortress along the east bank of the Nile. The trading post of Babylon, first mentioned in 50 BC, became a fortress, built by the Roman emperor Diocletian (r. 285–305) at the entrance of a canal connecting the Nile to the Red Sea that was created earlier by Emperor Trajan (r. 98–117). (Note: The historical chronicler John of Nikiou attributed the construction of the fortress to Trajan, but more recent excavations date the fortress to the time of Diocletian. A succession of canals connecting the Nile Valley with the Red Sea were also previously dug around this region in different periods prior to Trajan. Trajan's canal fell out of use some time between the reign of Diocletian and the 7th century.) Further north of the fortress, near the present-day district of al-Azbakiya, was a port and fortified outpost known as Tendunyas (Coptic: ϯⲁⲛⲧⲱⲛⲓⲁⲥ) or Umm Dunayn. While no structures older than the 7th century have been preserved in the area aside from the Roman fortifications, historical evidence suggests that a sizeable city existed. The city was important enough that its bishop, Cyrus, participated in the Second Council of Ephesus in 449.

The Byzantine-Sassanian War between 602 and 628 caused great hardship and likely led much of the urban population to leave for the countryside, leaving the settlement partly deserted. The site today remains at the nucleus of the Coptic Orthodox community, which separated from the Roman and Byzantine churches in the late 4th century. Cairo's oldest extant churches, such as the Church of Saint Barbara and the Church of Saints Sergius and Bacchus (from the late 7th or early 8th century), are located inside the fortress walls in what is now known as Old Cairo or Coptic Cairo.

=== Fustat and other early Islamic settlements ===
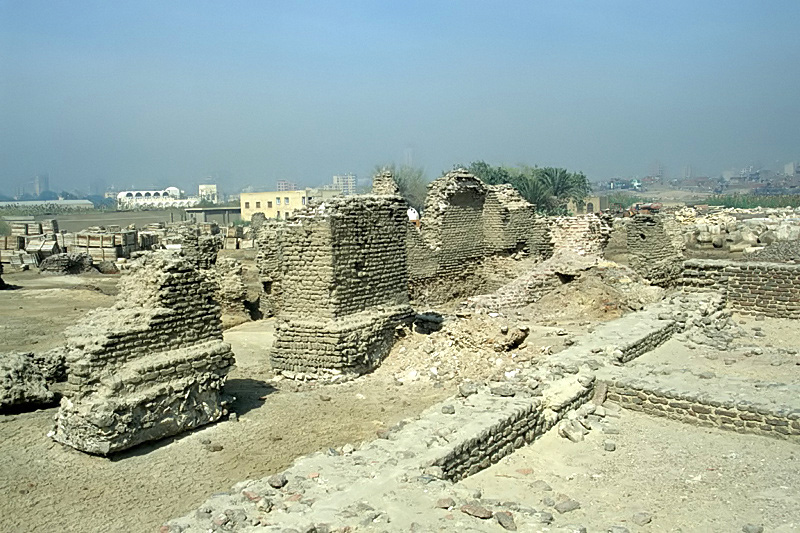
Excavated ruins of Fustat, 2004

The Muslim conquest of Byzantine Egypt was led by Amr ibn al-As from 639 to 642. Babylon Fortress was besieged in September 640 and fell in April 641. In 641 or early 642, after the surrender of Alexandria, the Egyptian capital at the time, he founded a new settlement next to Babylon Fortress. The city, known as Fustat (Arabic: الفسطاط, romanised: al-Fusṭāṭ, lit. 'the tent'), served as a garrison town and as the new administrative capital of Egypt. Historians such as Janet Abu-Lughod and André Raymond trace the genesis of present-day Cairo to the foundation of Fustat.

The choice of founding a new settlement at this inland location, instead of using the existing capital of Alexandria on the Mediterranean coast, may have been due to the new conquerors' strategic priorities. One of the first projects of the new Muslim administration was to clear and re-open Trajan's ancient canal in order to ship grain more directly from Egypt to Medina, the capital of the caliphate in Arabia. Ibn al-As also founded a mosque for the city at the same time, now known as the Mosque of Amr Ibn al-As, the oldest mosque in Egypt and Africa (although the current structure dates from later expansions).

In 750, following the overthrow of the Umayyad Caliphate by the Abbasids, the new rulers created their own settlement to the northeast of Fustat which became the new provincial capital. This was known as al-Askar (Arabic: العسكر, lit. 'the camp') as it was laid out like a military camp. A governor's residence and a new mosque were also added, with the latter completed in 786. The Red Sea canal re-excavated in the 7th century was closed by the Abbasid Caliph al-Mansur (r. 754–775), but a part of the canal, known as the Khalij, continued to be a major feature of Cairo's geography and of its water supply until the 19th century. In 861, on the orders of the Abbasid Caliph al-Mutawakkil, a Nilometer was built on Roda Island near Fustat. Although it was repaired and given a new roof in later centuries, its basic structure is still preserved today, making it the oldest preserved Islamic-era structure in Cairo today.

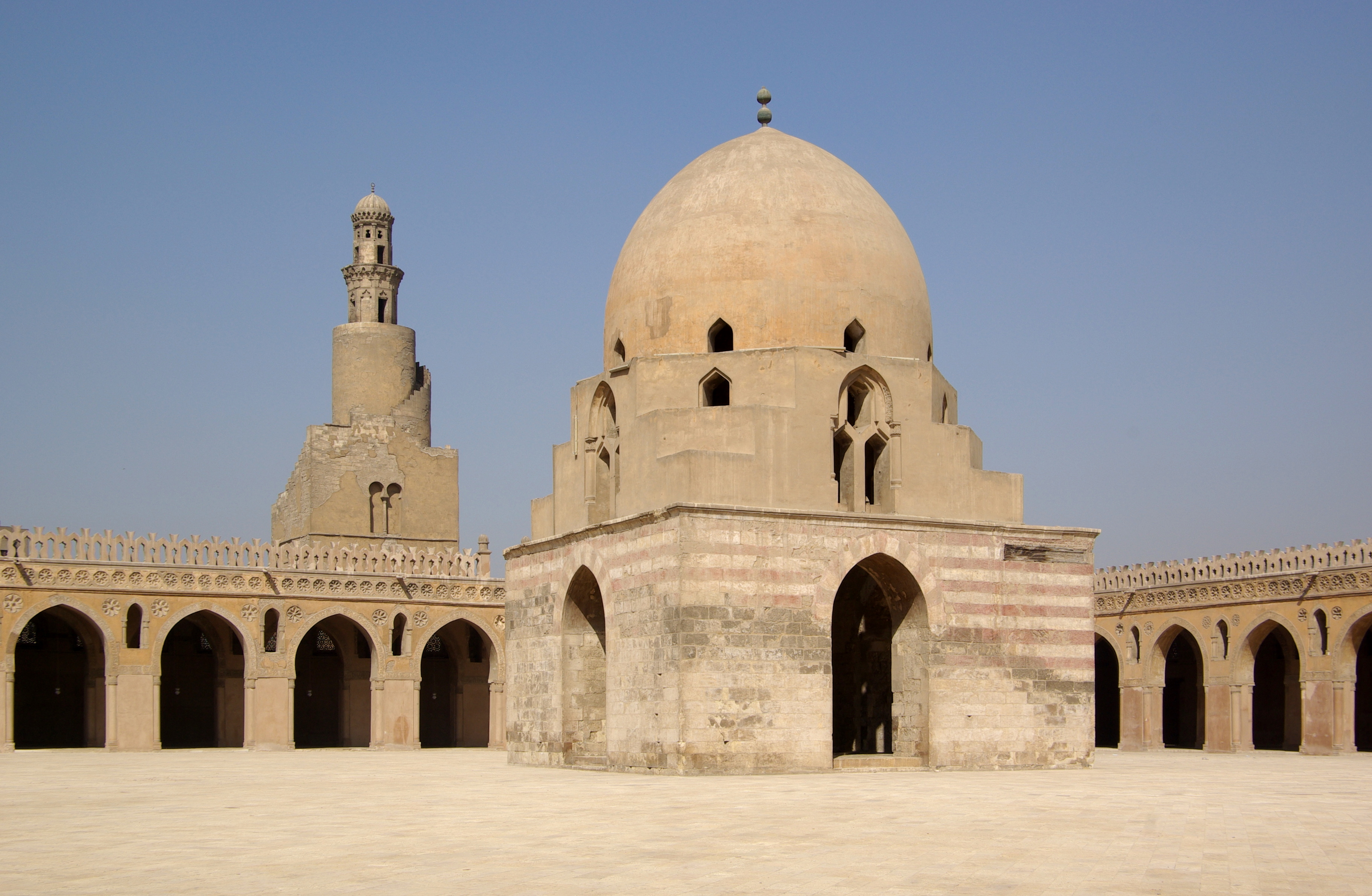
The Mosque of Ibn Tulun, built by Ahmad Ibn Tulun in 876–879 AD

In 868, a commander of Turkic origin named Bakbak was sent to Egypt by the Abbasid Caliph al-Mu'taz to restore order after a rebellion in the country. He was accompanied by his stepson, Ahmad ibn Tulun, who became effective governor of Egypt. Over time, Ibn Tulun gained an army and accumulated influence and wealth, allowing him to become the de facto independent ruler of both Egypt and Syria by 878. In 870, he used his growing wealth to found a new administrative capital, al-Qata'i (Arabic: القطائـع, lit. 'the allotments'), to the northeast of Fustat and of al-Askar.

The new city included a palace known as the Dar al-Imara, a parade ground known as al-Maydan, a bimaristan (hospital), and an aqueduct to supply water. Between 876 and 879 Ibn Tulun built a great mosque, now known as the Mosque of Ibn Tulun, at the centre of the city, next to the palace. After his death in 884, Ibn Tulun was succeeded by his son and his descendants who continued a short-lived dynasty, the Tulunids. In 905, the Abbasids sent general Muhammad Sulayman al-Katib to re-assert direct control over the country. Tulunid rule was ended and al-Qatta'i was razed to the ground, except for the mosque which remains standing today.

=== Foundation and expansion of Cairo under the Fatimids ===
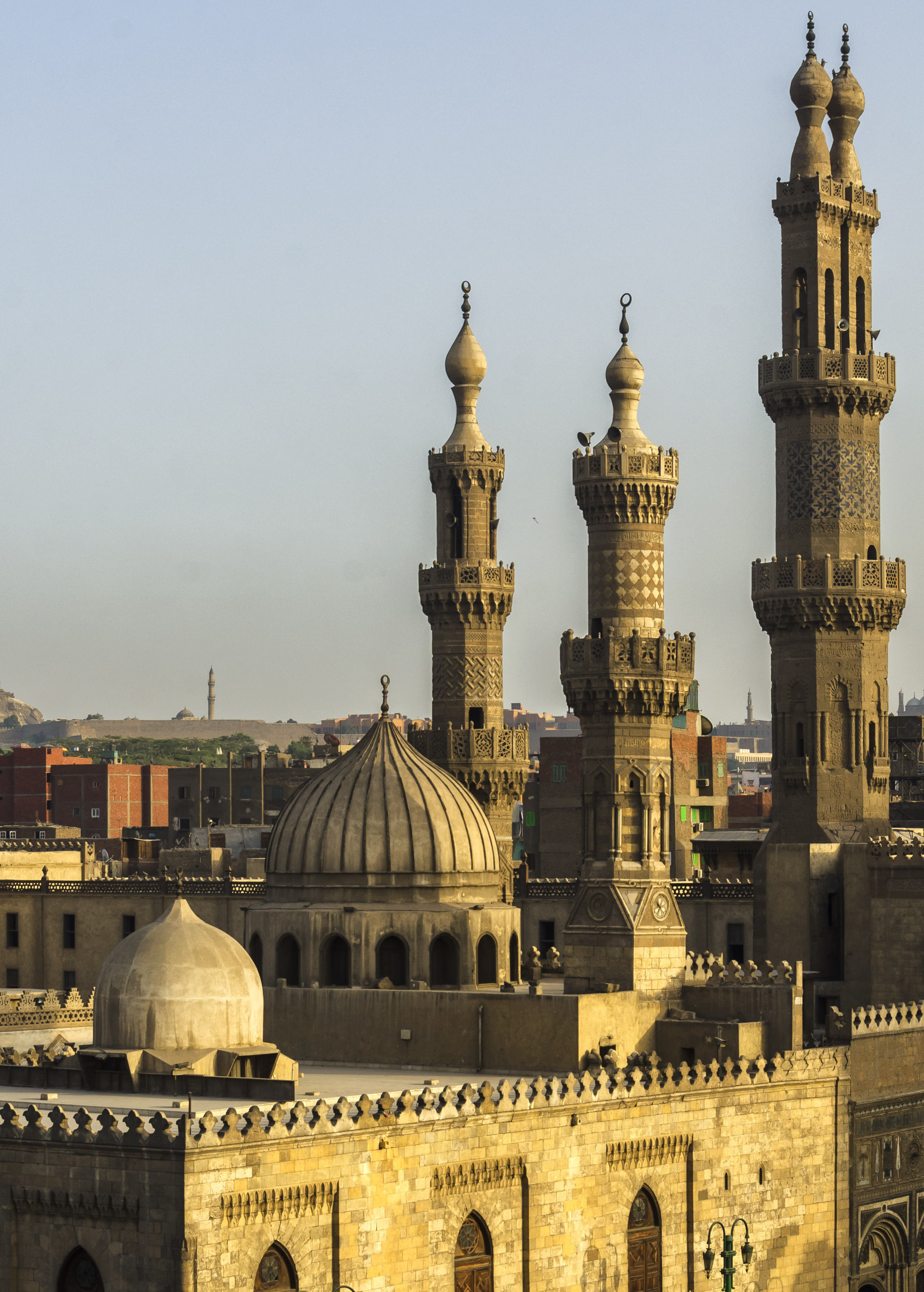
The Al-Azhar Mosque, built in 970–972 in the wake of the establishment of Cairo as the capital of the Fatimid Caliphate

In 969, the Fatimid Caliphate conquered Egypt after ruling from Ifriqiya. The Fatimid Caliph al-Mu'izz li-Din Allah instructed his courtier and general Jawhar al-Saqili to establish a new fortified city northeast of Fustat and of former al-Qata'i. It took four years to build the city, initially known as al-Manṣūriyyah, which was to serve as the new capital of the caliphate. During that time, the construction of the al-Azhar Mosque was commissioned by order of the caliph, which developed into the third-oldest university in the world. Cairo would eventually become a centre of learning, with the library of Cairo containing hundreds of thousands of books. When Caliph al-Mu'izz arrived from the old Fatimid capital of Mahdia in Tunisia in 973, he gave the city its present name, Qāhirat al-Mu'izz ("The Vanquisher of al-Mu'izz"), from which the name "Cairo" (al-Qāhira) originates. The caliphs lived in a vast and lavish palace complex that occupied the heart of the city. Cairo remained a relatively exclusive royal city for most of this era, but during the tenure of Badr al-Gamali as vizier (1073–1094) the restrictions were loosened for the first time and richer families from Fustat were allowed to move into the city. Between 1087 and 1092 Badr al-Gamali also rebuilt the city walls in stone and constructed the city gates of Bab al-Futuh, Bab al-Nasr, and Bab Zuweila that still stand today.

During the Fatimid period Fustat reached its apogee in size and prosperity, acting as a centre of craftsmanship and international trade and as the area's main port on the Nile. Historical sources report that multi-story communal residences existed in the city, particularly in its centre, which were typically inhabited by middle and lower-class residents. Some of these were as high as seven stories and could house some 200 to 350 people. They may have been similar to Roman insulae and may have been the prototypes for the rental apartment complexes which became common in the later Mamluk and Ottoman periods. However, in 1168 the Fatimid vizier Shawar set fire to the unfortified Fustat to prevent its potential capture by Amalric, the Crusader king of Jerusalem. While the fire did not destroy the city and it continued to exist afterward, it did mark the beginning of its decline. Over the following centuries it was Cairo, the former palace-city, that became the new economic centre and attracted migration from Fustat.

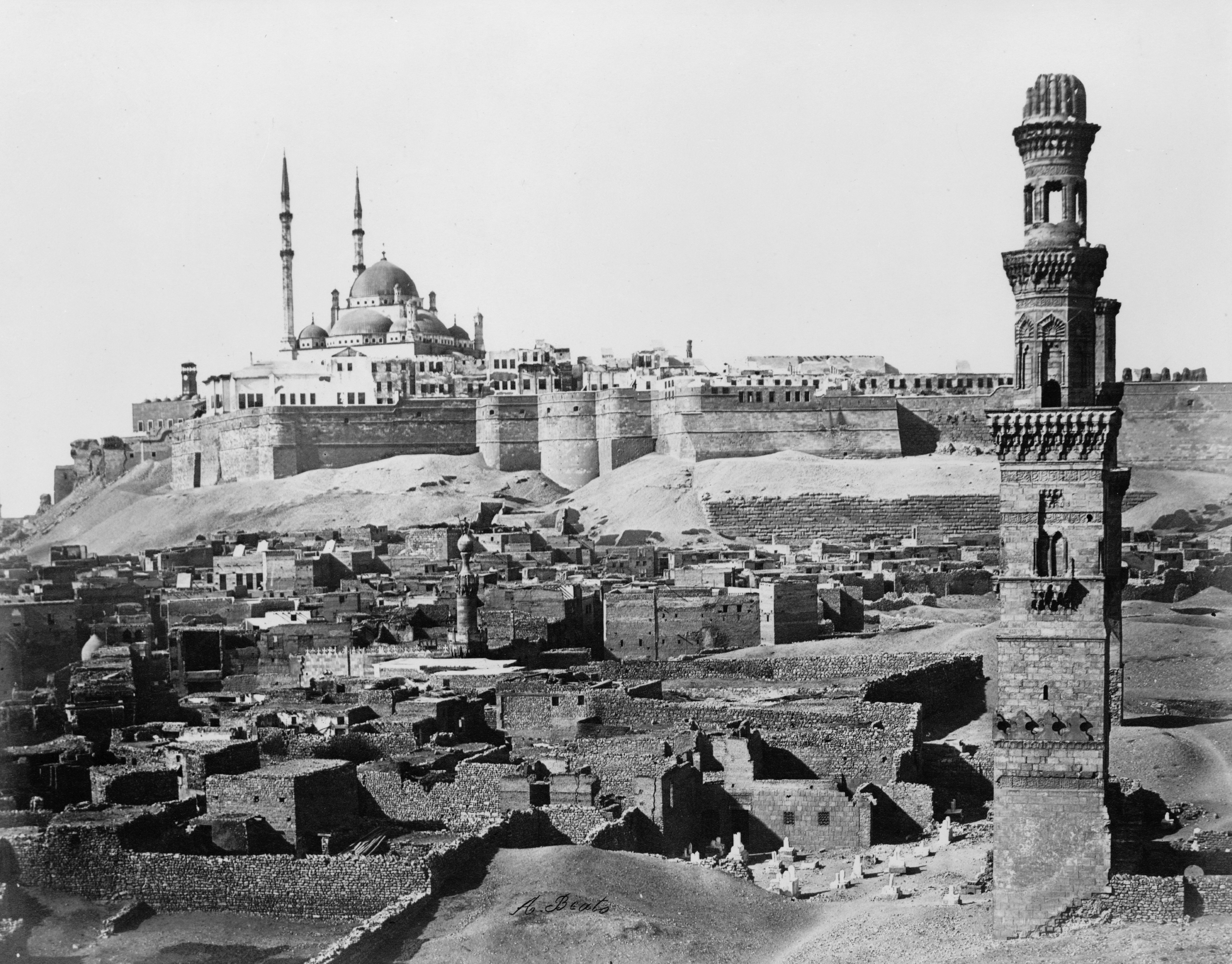
The Cairo Citadel, seen above in the 19th century, commissioned in 1176

While the Crusaders did not capture the city in 1168, a continuing power struggle between Shawar, King Amalric, and the Zengid general Shirkuh led to the downfall of the Fatimid establishment. In 1169, Shirkuh's nephew Saladin was appointed as the new vizier of Egypt by the Fatimids, and two years later, he seized power from the family of the last Fatimid caliph, al-'Āḍid. As the first Sultan of Egypt, Saladin established the Ayyubid dynasty, based in Cairo, and aligned Egypt with the Sunni Abbasids, who were based in Baghdad. In 1176, Saladin began construction on the Cairo Citadel, which was to serve as the seat of the Egyptian government until the mid-19th century. The construction of the Citadel definitively ended Fatimid-built Cairo's status as an exclusive palace-city and opened it up to common Egyptians and to foreign merchants, spurring its commercial development. Along with the Citadel, Saladin also began the construction of a new 20-kilometre-long wall that would protect both Cairo and Fustat on their eastern side and connect them with the new Citadel. These construction projects continued beyond Saladin's lifetime and were completed under his Ayyubid successors.

=== Further expansion and decline under the Ayyubids and Mamluks ===
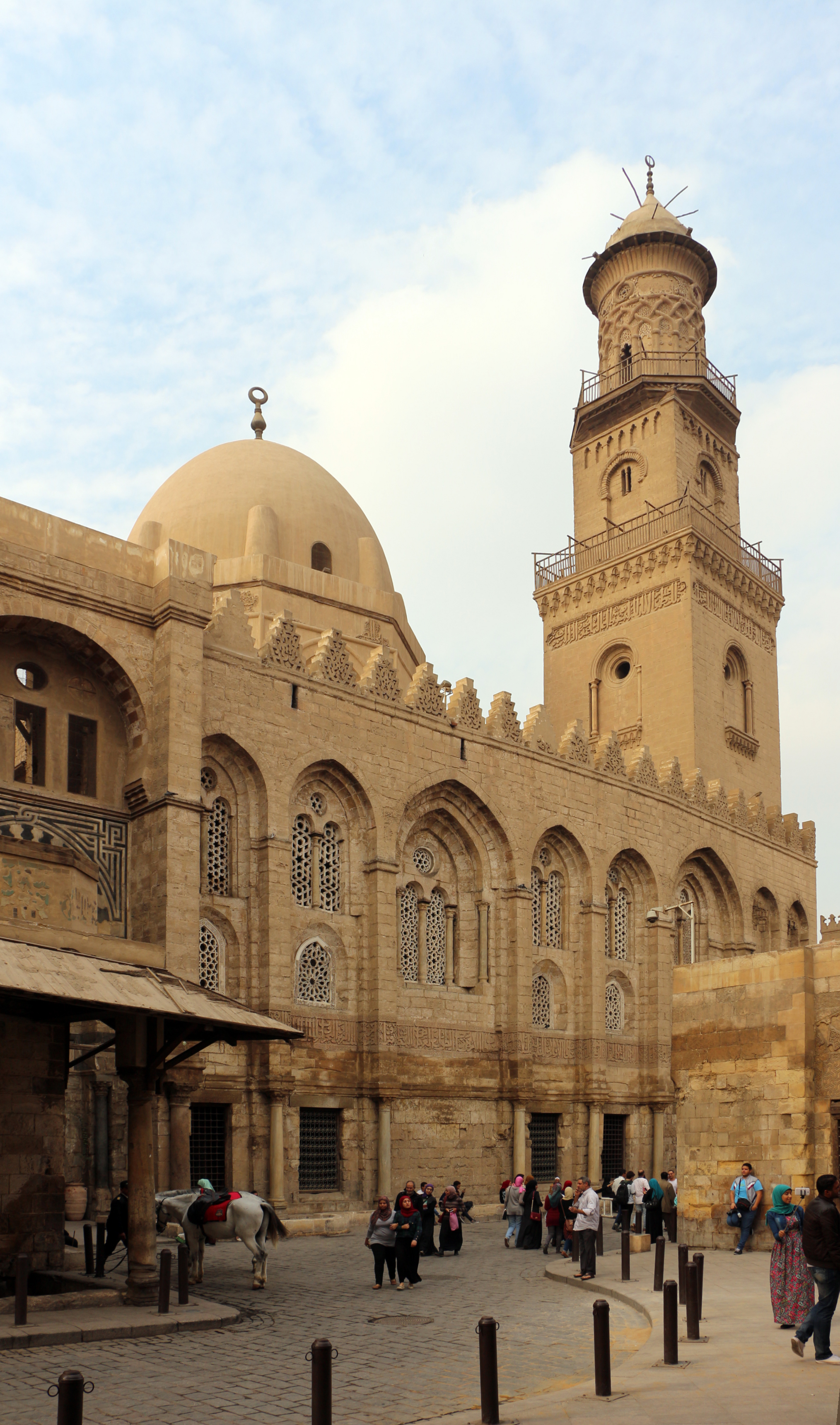
The Mausoleum-Madrasa-Hospital complex of Sultan Qalawun, built in 1284–1285 in the centre of Cairo, over the remains of a Fatimid palace

In 1250, during the Seventh Crusade, the Ayyubid dynasty had a crisis with the death of al-Salih and power transitioned instead to the Mamluks, partly with the help of al-Salih's wife, Shajar ad-Durr, who ruled for a brief period around this time. Mamluks were soldiers who were purchased as young slaves and raised to serve in the sultan's army. Between 1250 and 1517 the throne of the Mamluk Sultanate passed from one mamluk to another in a system of succession that was generally non-hereditary, but also frequently violent and chaotic. The Mamluk Empire nonetheless became a major power in the region and was responsible for repelling the advance of the Mongols (most famously at the Battle of Ain Jalut in 1260) and for eliminating the last Crusader states in the Levant.

Despite their military character, the Mamluks were also prolific builders and left a rich architectural legacy throughout Cairo. Continuing a practice started by the Ayyubids, much of the land occupied by former Fatimid palaces was sold and replaced by newer buildings, becoming a prestigious site for the construction of Mamluk religious and funerary complexes. Construction projects initiated by the Mamluks pushed the city outward while also bringing new infrastructure to the centre of the city. Meanwhile, Cairo flourished as a centre of Islamic scholarship and a crossroads on the spice trade route among the civilisations in Afro-Eurasia. Under the reign of the Mamluk sultan al-Nasir Muhammad (1293–1341, with interregnums), Cairo reached its apogee in terms of population and wealth. By 1340, Cairo had a population of close to half a million, making it the largest city west of China.

Multi-story buildings occupied by rental apartments, known as a rab' (plural ribā' or urbu), became common in the Mamluk period and continued to be a feature of the city's housing during the later Ottoman period. These apartments were often laid out as multi-story duplexes or triplexes. They were sometimes attached to caravanserais, where the two lower floors were for commercial and storage purposes and the multiple stories above them were rented out to tenants. The oldest partially-preserved example of this type of structure is the Wikala of Amir Qawsun, built before 1341. Residential buildings were in turn organised into close-knit neighbourhoods called a harat, which in many cases had gates that could be closed off at night or during disturbances.

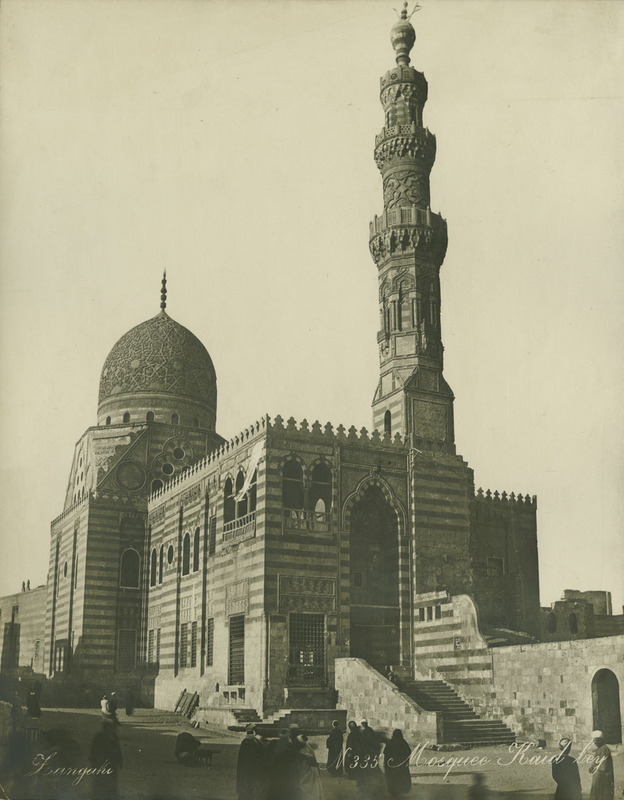
Funerary complex of Sultan Qaytbay, built in 1470–1474 in the Northern Cemetery (seen in 1880)

When the traveller Ibn Battuta first came to Cairo in 1326, he described it as the principal district of Egypt. When he passed through the area again on his return journey in 1348, the Black Death was ravaging most major cities. He cited reports of thousands of deaths per day in Cairo. Although Cairo avoided Europe's stagnation during the Late Middle Ages, it could not escape the Black Death, which struck the city more than fifty times between 1348 and 1517.

During its initial and most deadly waves, approximately 200,000 people were killed by the plague, and by the 15th century, Cairo's population had been reduced to between 150,000 and 300,000. The population decline was accompanied by a period of political instability between 1348 and 1412. It was nonetheless in this period that the largest Mamluk-era religious monument, the Madrasa-Mosque of Sultan Hasan, was built. In the late 14th century, the Burji Mamluks replaced the Bahri Mamluks as rulers of the Mamluk state, but the Mamluk system continued to decline.

Though the plagues returned frequently throughout the 15th century, Cairo remained a major metropolis and its population recovered in part through rural migration. More conscious efforts were conducted by rulers and city officials to redress the city's infrastructure and cleanliness. Its economy and politics also became more deeply connected with the wider Mediterranean. Some Mamluk sultans in this period, such as Barbsay (r. 1422–1438) and Qaytbay (r. 1468–1496), had relatively long and successful reigns. After al-Nasir Muhammad, Qaytbay was one of the most prolific patrons of art and architecture of the Mamluk era. He built or restored numerous monuments in Cairo, in addition to commissioning projects beyond Egypt. The crisis of Mamluk power and of Cairo's economic role deepened after Qaytbay. The city's status was diminished after Vasco da Gama discovered a sea route around the Cape of Good Hope between 1497 and 1499, thereby allowing spice traders to avoid Cairo.

=== Ottoman rule ===
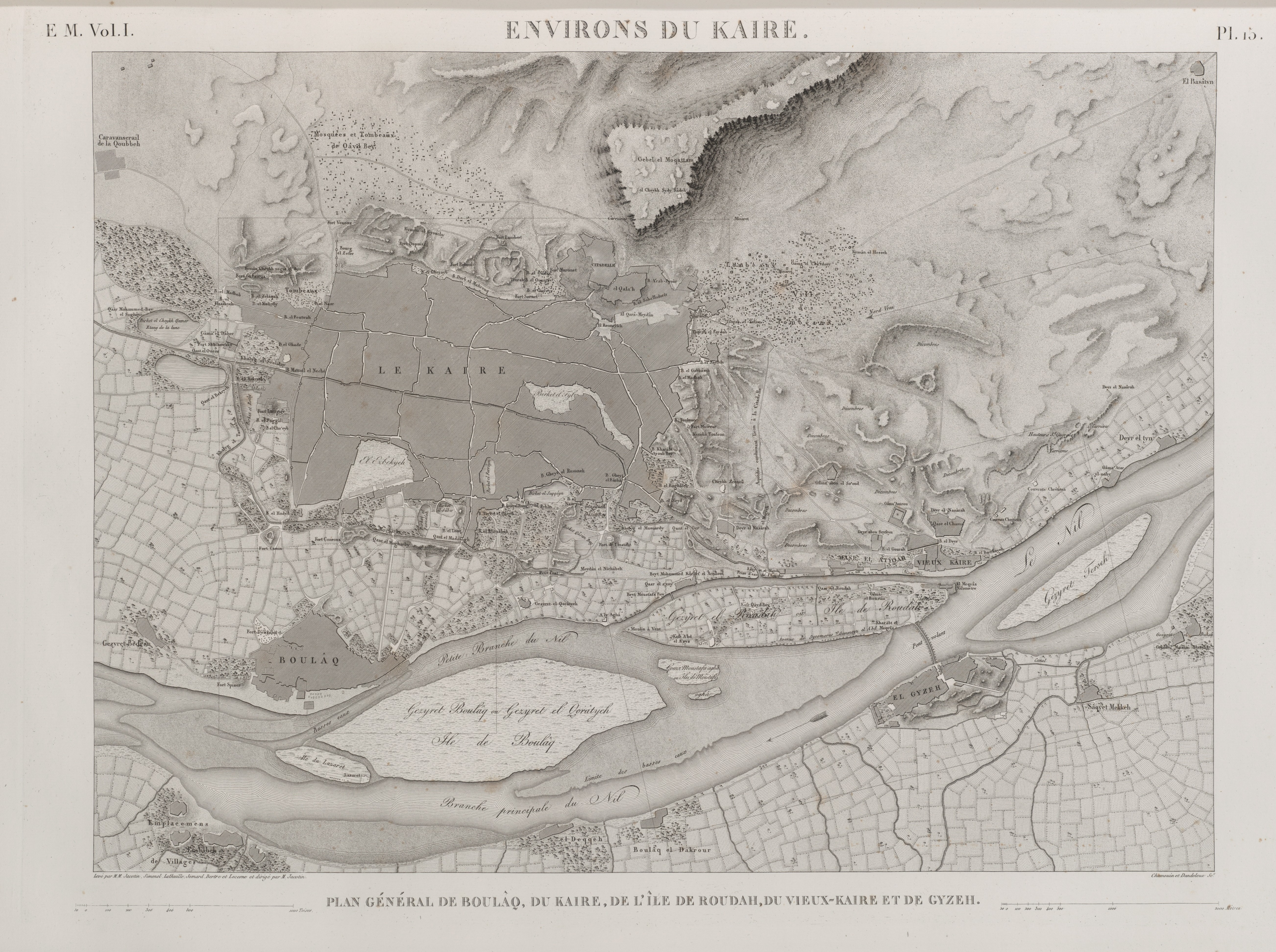
A map of Cairo in 1809, from the Description de l'Égypte

Cairo's political influence diminished significantly after the Ottomans defeated Sultan al-Ghuri in the Battle of Marj Dabiq in 1516 and conquered Egypt in 1517. Ruling from Constantinople, Sultan Selim I relegated Egypt to a province, with Cairo as its capital. For this reason, the history of Cairo during the Ottoman era is often described as inconsequential, especially in comparison to other time periods.

During the 16th and 17th centuries, Cairo still remained an important economic and cultural centre. Although no longer on the spice route, the city facilitated the transportation of Yemeni coffee and Indian textiles, primarily to Anatolia, North Africa, and the Balkans. Cairene merchants were instrumental in bringing goods to the barren Hejaz, especially during the annual hajj to Mecca. It was during this same period that al-Azhar University attained a predominance among Islamic schools that it continues to hold today; pilgrims on their way to hajj often attested to the superiority of the institution, which had become associated with Egypt's body of Islamic scholars. The first printing press of the Middle East, printing in Hebrew, was established in Cairo c. 1557 by a scion of the Soncino family of printers, Italian Jews of Ashkenazi origin who operated a press in Constantinople. The existence of the press is known solely from two fragments discovered in the Cairo Geniza.

Under the Ottomans, Cairo expanded south and west from its nucleus around the Citadel. The city was the second-largest in the empire, behind Constantinople, and, although migration was not the primary source of Cairo's growth, twenty percent of its population at the end of the 18th century consisted of religious minorities and foreigners from around the Mediterranean. Still, when Napoleon arrived in Cairo in 1798, the city's population was less than 300,000, forty percent lower than it was at the height of Mamluk—and Cairene—influence in the mid-14th century.

The French occupation was short-lived as British and Ottoman forces, including a sizeable Albanian contingent, recaptured the country in 1801. Cairo itself was besieged by a British and Ottoman force culminating with the French surrender on 22 June 1801. The British vacated Egypt two years later, leaving the Ottomans, the Albanians, and the long-weakened Mamluks jostling for control of the country. Continued civil war allowed an Albanian named Muhammad Ali Pasha to ascend to the role of commander and eventually, with the approval of the religious establishment, viceroy of Egypt in 1805.

=== Modern era ===
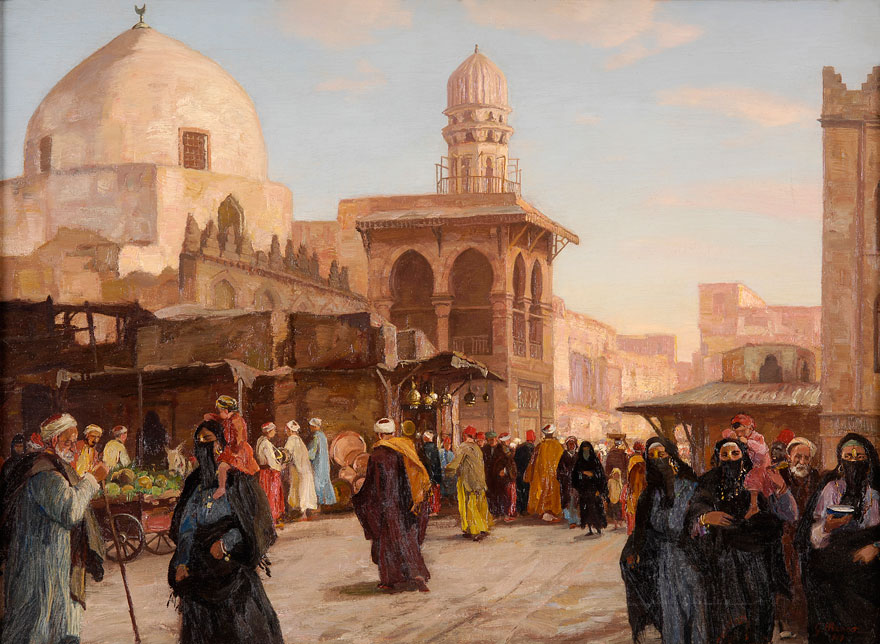
Cairo in the late 19th century, Georg Macco (1863–1933), oil on canvas.

Until his death in 1848, Muhammad Ali Pasha instituted a number of social and economic reforms that earned him the title of founder of modern Egypt. However, while Muhammad Ali initiated the construction of public buildings in the city, those reforms had minimal effect on Cairo's landscape. Bigger changes came to Cairo under Isma'il Pasha (r. 1863–1879), who continued the modernisation processes started by his grandfather. Drawing inspiration from Paris, Isma'il envisioned a city of maidans and wide avenues; due to financial constraints, only some of them, in the area now composing Downtown Cairo, came to fruition. Isma'il also sought to modernise the city, which was merging with neighbouring settlements, by establishing a public works ministry, bringing gas and lighting to the city, and opening a theatre and opera house.

The immense debt resulting from Isma'il's projects provided a pretext for increasing European control, which culminated with the British invasion in 1882. The city's economic centre quickly moved west toward the Nile, away from the historic Islamic Cairo section and toward the contemporary, European-style areas built by Isma'il. Europeans accounted for five percent of Cairo's population at the end of the 19th century, by which point they held most top governmental positions.

In 1906, the Heliopolis Oasis Company headed by the Belgian industrialist Édouard Empain and his Egyptian counterpart Boghos Nubar, built a suburb called Heliopolis (city of the sun in Greek) ten kilometres from the centre of Cairo. In 1905–1907 the northern part of the Gezira island was developed by the Baehler Company into Zamalek, which would later become Cairo's upscale "chic" neighbourhood. In 1906 construction began on Garden City, a neighbourhood of urban villas with gardens and curved streets.

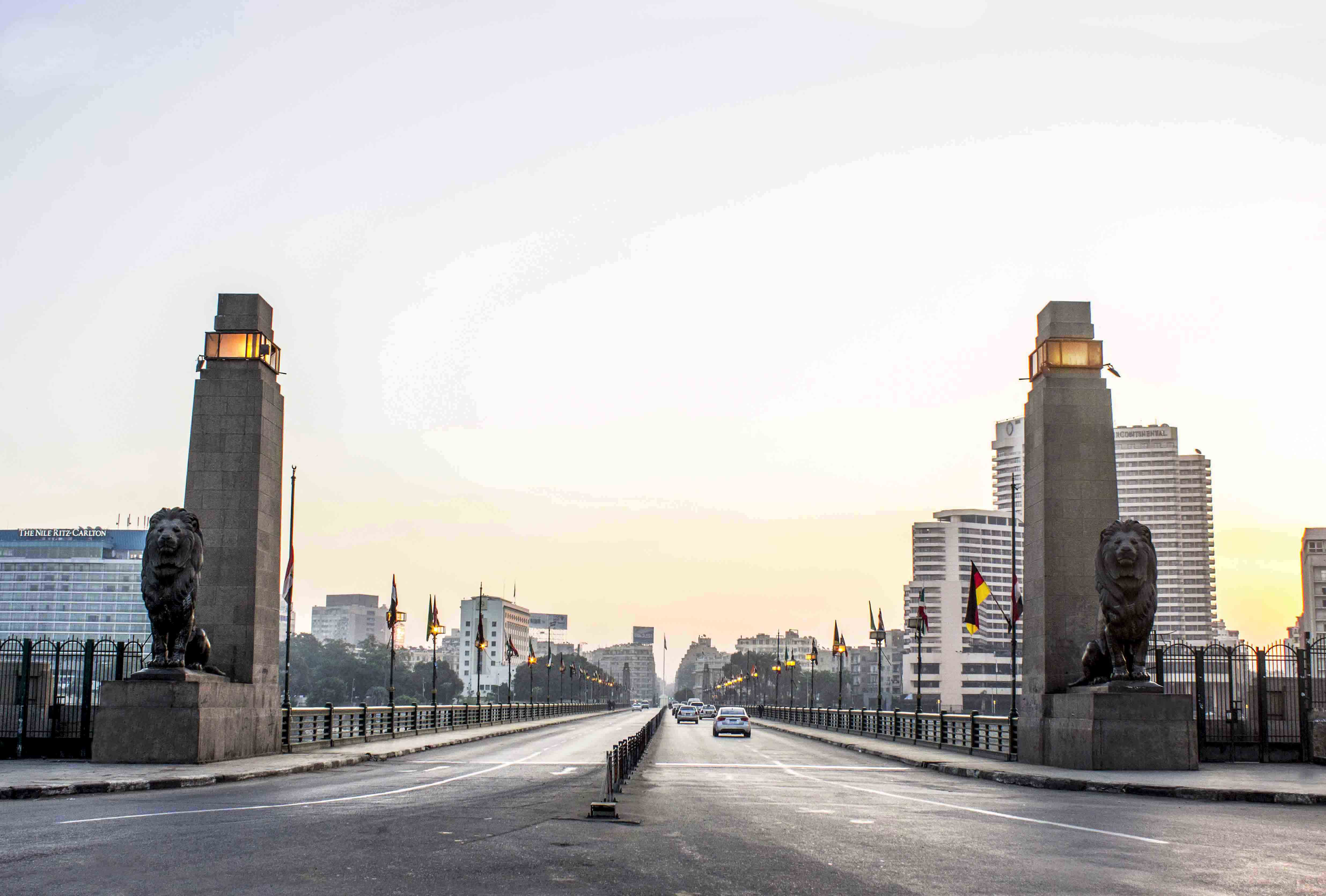
Qasr El Nil Bridge

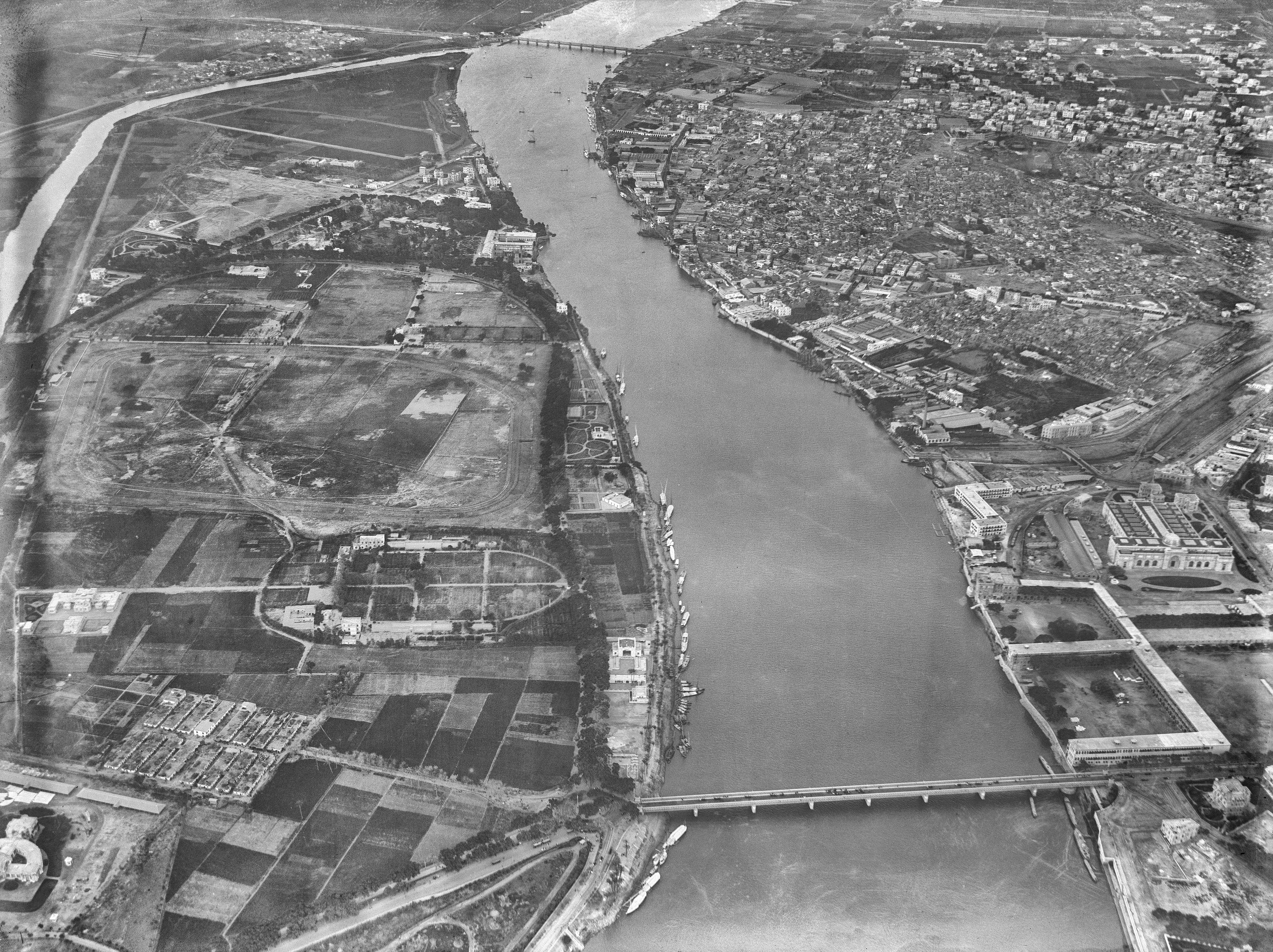
Aerial view in 1904 from a balloon of the central-eastern edge of Cairo, showing the early development of Gezira/Zamalek Island (center left), and Downtown (lower right), as well as Bulaq (upper right).

The British occupation was intended to be temporary, but it lasted well into the 20th century. Nationalists staged large-scale demonstrations in Cairo in 1919, five years after Egypt had been declared a British protectorate. Nevertheless, this led to Egypt's independence in 1922.

The King Fuad I Edition of the Qur'an was first published on 10 July 1924 in Cairo under the patronage of King Fuad. The goal of the government of the newly formed Kingdom of Egypt was not to delegitimise the other variant Quranic texts ("qira'at"), but to eliminate errors found in Qur'anic texts used in state schools. A committee of teachers chose to preserve a single one of the canonical qira'at "readings", namely that of the "Ḥafṣ" version, an 8th-century Kufic recitation. This edition has become the standard for modern printings of the Quran for much of the Islamic world. The publication has been called a "terrific success", and the edition has been described as one "now widely seen as the official text of the Qur'an", so popular among both Sunni and Shi'a that the common belief among less well-informed Muslims is "that the Qur'an has a single, unambiguous reading". Minor amendments were made later in 1924 and in 1936 - the "Faruq edition" in honour of then ruler, King Faruq.

==== British occupation until 1956 ====
British troops remained in the country until 1956. During this time, urban Cairo, spurred by new bridges and transport links, continued to expand to include the upscale neighbourhoods of Garden City, Zamalek, and Heliopolis. Between 1882 and 1937, the population of Cairo more than tripled—from 347,000 to 1.3 million —and its area increased from 10 to 163 square kilometres (4 to 63 sq mi).

The city was devastated during the 1952 riots known as the Cairo Fire or Black Saturday, which saw the destruction of nearly 700 shops, movie theatres, casinos and hotels in downtown Cairo. The British departed Cairo following the Egyptian Revolution of 1952, but the city's rapid growth showed no signs of abating. Seeking to accommodate the increasing population, President Gamal Abdel Nasser redeveloped Tahrir Square and the Nile Corniche, and improved the city's network of bridges and highways. Meanwhile, additional controls of the Nile fostered development within Gezira Island and along the city's waterfront. The metropolis began to encroach on the fertile Nile Delta, prompting the government to build desert satellite towns and devise incentives for city-dwellers to move to them.

==== After 1956 ====
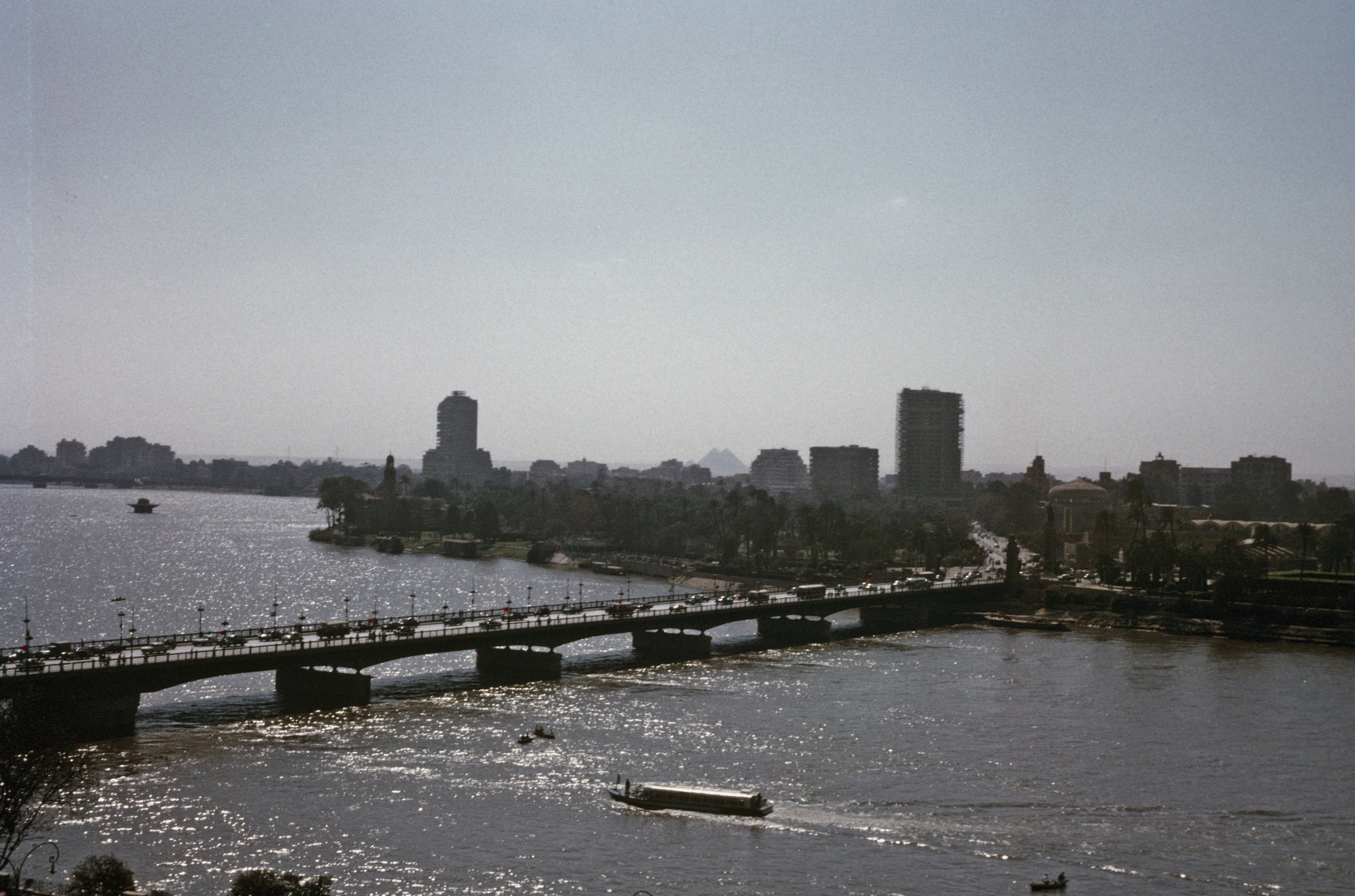
View of Qasr El Nil Bridge in Cairo, 1965

In the second half of the 20th century, Cairo continued to grow enormously in both population and area. Between 1947 and 2006, the population of Greater Cairo went from 2,986,280 to 16,292,269. The population explosion also drove the rise of "informal" housing ('ashwa'iyyat), meaning housing that was built without any official planning or control. The exact form of this type of housing varies considerably but usually has a much higher population density than formal housing. By 2009, over 63% of the population of Greater Cairo lived in informal neighbourhoods, even though these occupied only 17% of the total area of Greater Cairo. According to economist David Sims, informal housing has the benefits of providing affordable accommodation and vibrant communities to huge numbers of Cairo's working classes, but it also suffers from government neglect, a relative lack of services, and overcrowding.

The "formal" city was also expanded. The most notable example was the creation of Madinat Nasr, a huge government-sponsored expansion of the city to the east which officially began in 1959 but was primarily developed in the mid-1970s. In 1979, the government established the New Urban Communities Authority (NUCA) to initiate and direct the development of new towns on the outskirts of Cairo, generally established on desert land. These new satellite cities were intended to provide housing, investment, and employment opportunities for the region's growing population as well as to pre-empt the further growth of informal neighbourhoods. As of 2014, about 10% of the population of Greater Cairo lived in the new cities.

Concurrently, Cairo established itself as a political and economic hub for North Africa and the Arab world, with many multinational businesses and organisations, including the Arab League, operating out of the city. In 1979 the historic districts of Cairo were listed as a UNESCO World Heritage Site.

In 1992, Cairo was hit by an earthquake which caused 545 deaths, injured 6,512 and left around 50,000 people homeless.

==== 2011 Egyptian revolution ====
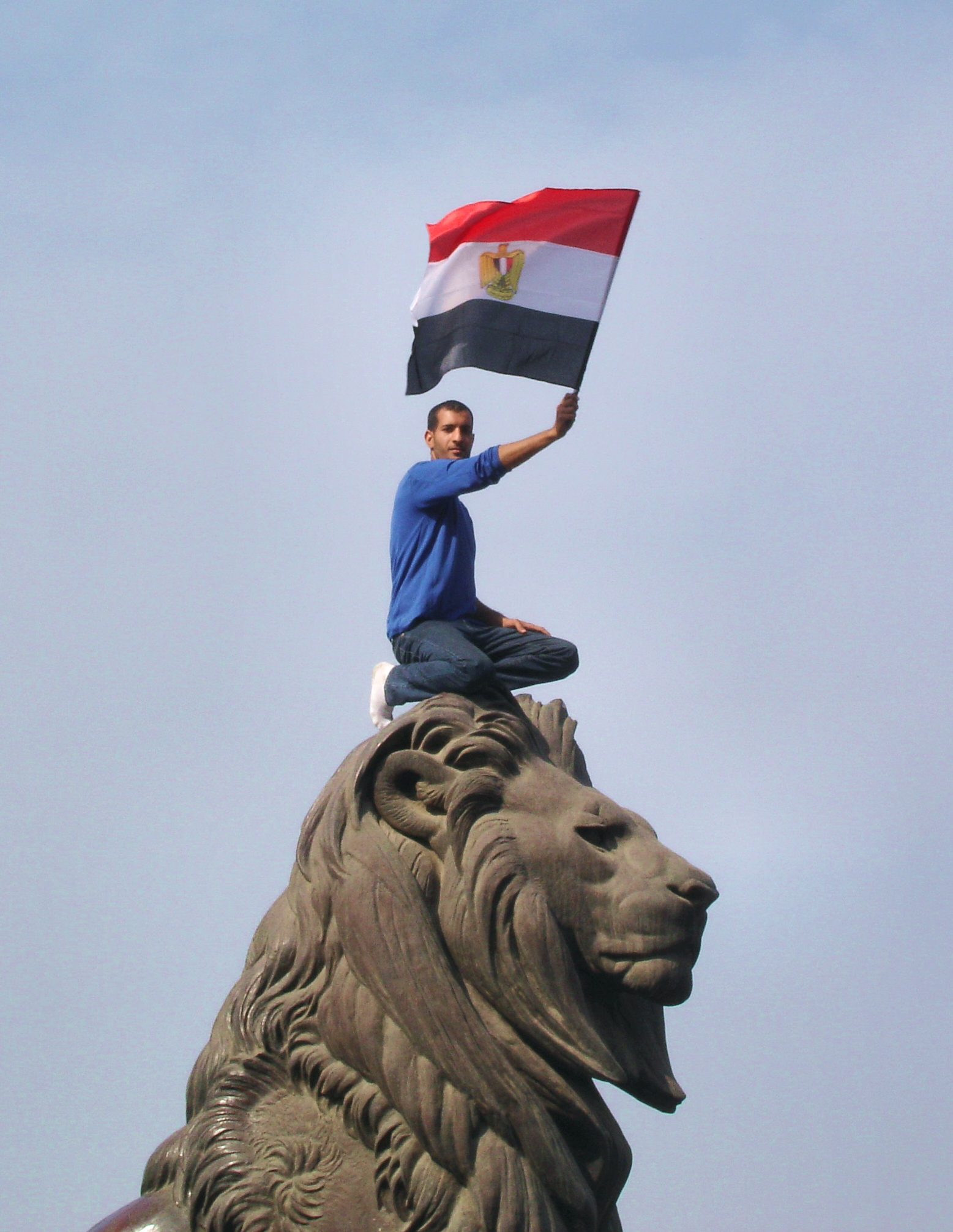
A protester holding an Egyptian flag during the protests that started on 25 January 2011

Cairo's Tahrir Square was the focal point of the 2011 Egyptian revolution against former president Hosni Mubarak. More than 50,000 protesters first occupied the square on 25 January, during which the area's wireless services were reported to be impaired. In the following days, Tahrir Square continued to be the primary destination for protests in Cairo. The uprising was mainly a campaign of non-violent civil resistance, which featured a series of demonstrations, marches, acts of civil disobedience, and labour strikes. Millions of protesters from a variety of socio-economic and religious backgrounds demanded the overthrow of the regime of Egyptian President Hosni Mubarak.

Despite being predominantly peaceful in nature, the revolution was not without violent clashes between security forces and protesters, with at least 846 people killed and 6,000 injured. The uprising took place in Cairo, Alexandria, and in other cities in Egypt, following the Tunisian revolution that resulted in the overthrow of the long-time Tunisian president Zine El Abidine Ben Ali. On 11 February, following weeks of determined popular protest and pressure, Hosni Mubarak resigned from office.

==== Post-revolutionary Cairo ====
Under the rule of President el-Sisi, in March 2015, plans were announced for another yet-unnamed planned city to be built further east of the existing satellite city of New Cairo, intended to serve as the new capital of Egypt.

== Geography ==
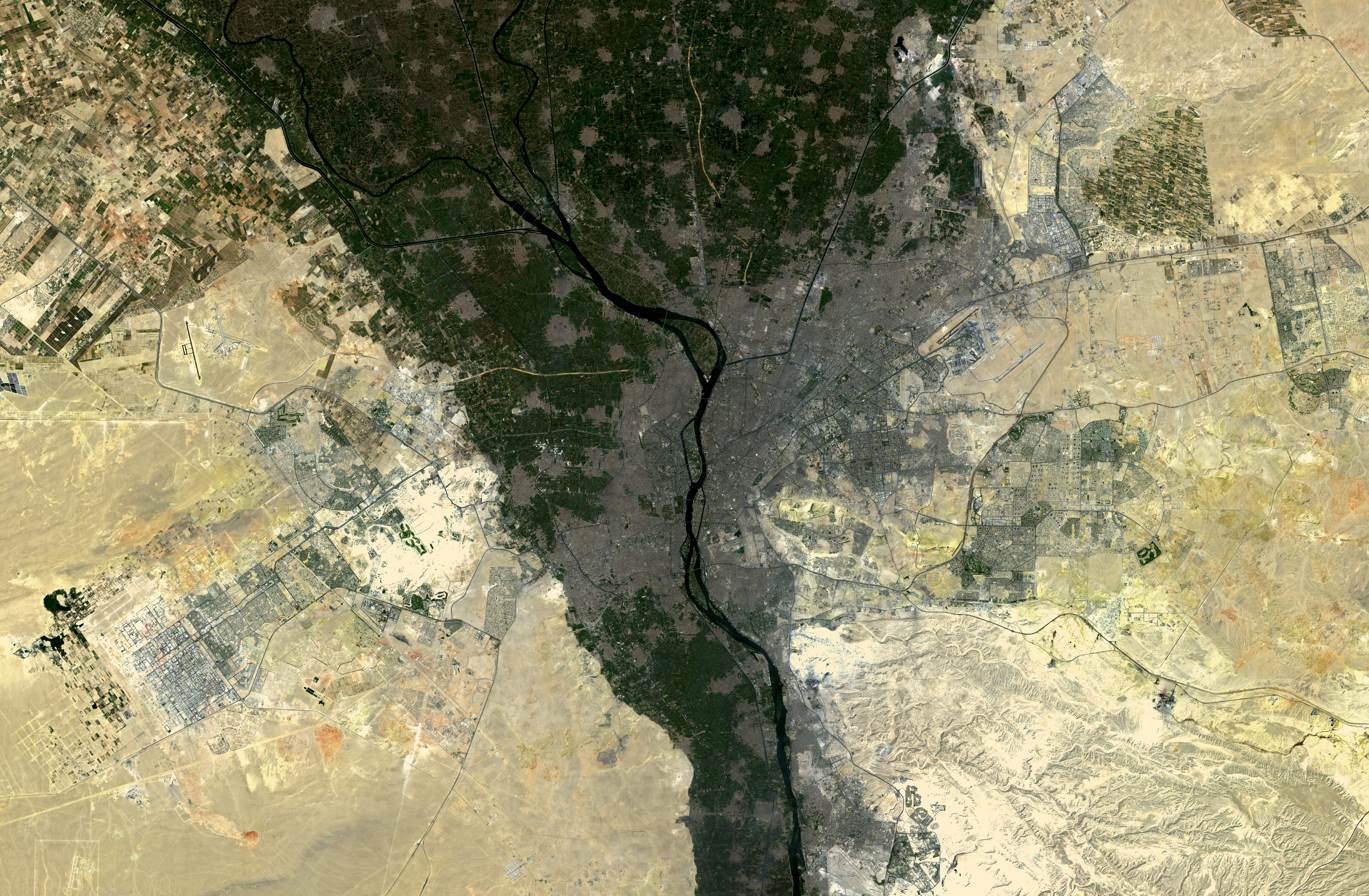
Greater Cairo seen from Sentinel-2A

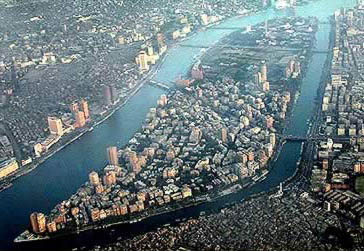
An aerial view looking south, with the Zamalek and Gezira districts on Gezira Island, surrounded by the Nile

Cairo is located in northern Egypt, known as Lower Egypt, 165 kilometres (100 mi) south of the Mediterranean Sea and 120 kilometres (75 mi) west of the Gulf of Suez and Suez Canal. The city lies along the Nile River, immediately south of the point where the river leaves its desert-bound valley and branches into the low-lying Nile Delta region. Although the Cairo metropolis extends away from the Nile in all directions, the city of Cairo resides only on the east bank of the river and two islands within it on a total area of 453 square kilometres (175 sq mi). Geologically, Cairo lies on alluvium and sand dunes which date from the quaternary period.

Until the mid-19th century, when the river was tamed by dams, levees, and other controls, the Nile in the vicinity of Cairo was highly susceptible to changes in course and surface level. Over the years, the Nile gradually shifted westward, providing the site between the eastern edge of the river and the Mokattam highlands on which the city now stands. The land on which Cairo was established in 969 (present-day Islamic Cairo) was located underwater just over three hundred years earlier, when Fustat was first built.

Low periods of the Nile during the 11th century continued to add to the landscape of Cairo; a new island, known as Geziret al-Fil, first appeared in 1174, but eventually became connected to the mainland. Today, the site of Geziret al-Fil is occupied by the Shubra district. The low periods created another island at the turn of the 14th century that now composes Zamalek and Gezira. Land reclamation efforts by the Mamluks and Ottomans further contributed to expansion on the east bank of the river.

Because of the Nile's movement, the newer parts of the city—Garden City, Downtown Cairo, and Zamalek—are located closest to the riverbank. The areas, which are home to most of Cairo's embassies, are surrounded on the north, east, and south by the older parts of the city. Old Cairo, located south of the centre, holds the remnants of Fustat and the heart of Egypt's Coptic Christian community, Coptic Cairo. The Boulaq district, which lies in the northern part of the city, was born out of a major 16th-century port and is now a major industrial centre.

The Citadel is located east of the city centre around Islamic Cairo, which dates back to the Fatimid era and the foundation of Cairo. While western Cairo is dominated by wide boulevards, open spaces, and modern architecture of European influence, the eastern half, having grown haphazardly over the centuries, is dominated by small lanes, crowded tenements, and Islamic architecture.

Northern and extreme eastern parts of Cairo, which include satellite towns, are among the most recent additions to the city, as they developed in the late 20th and early 21st centuries to accommodate the city's rapid growth. The western bank of the Nile is commonly included within the urban area of Cairo, but it composes the city of Giza and the Giza Governorate. Giza city has also undergone significant expansion over recent years, and today has a population of 2.7 million. The Cairo Governorate was just north of the Helwan Governorate from 2008 when some Cairo's southern districts, including Maadi and New Cairo, were split off and annexed into the new governorate, to 2011 when the Helwan Governorate was reincorporated into the Cairo Governorate.

According to the World Health Organization, the level of air pollution in Cairo is nearly 12 times higher than the recommended safety level.

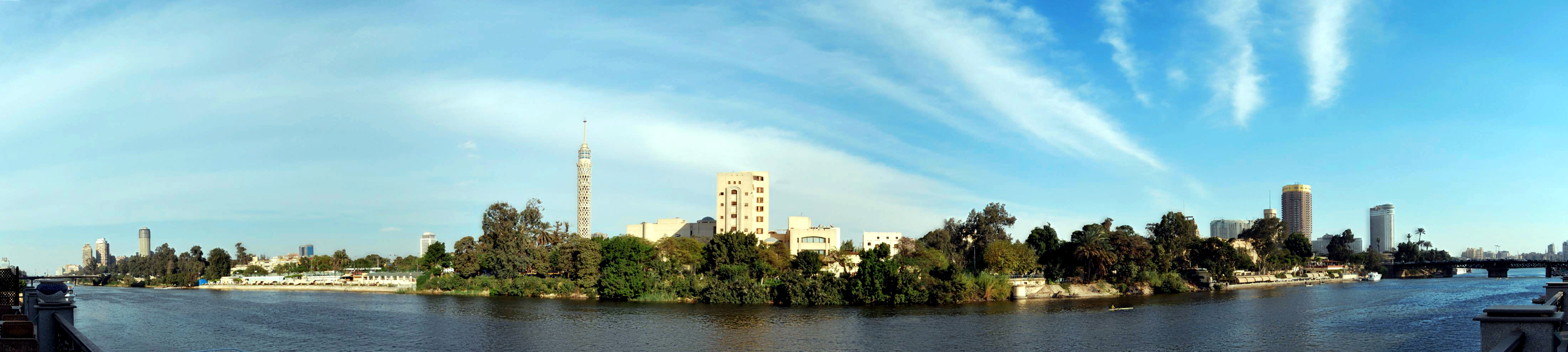
A panorama of the Nile in central Cairo showing the west side of Gezira Island, located in the middle of the Nile, with the Cairo Tower in the middle, the 6th October Bridge on the far left and El Galaa Bridge on the far right

=== Climate ===
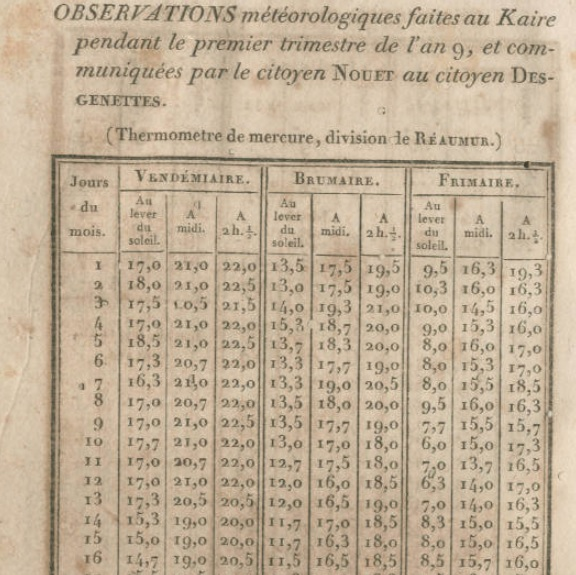
Cairo weather observations by French savants

In Cairo, and along the Nile River Valley, the climate is a hot desert climate (BWh according to the Köppen climate classification system).

Wind storms can be frequent, bringing Saharan dust into the city from March to May, and the air often becomes uncomfortably dry. Winters are mild, while summers are long and hot. High temperatures in winter range from 14 to 22 °C (57 to 72 °F), while night-time lows drop to below 11 °C (52 °F), often to 5 °C (41 °F). In summer, the highs often exceed 31 °C (88 °F) but rarely surpass 40 °C (104 °F), and lows drop to about 20 °C (68 °F). Rainfall is sparse and only happens in the colder months, but sudden showers can cause severe flooding. The summer months have high humidity due to Cairo's proximity to the Mediterranean coast. Snowfall is extremely rare; a small amount of graupel, widely believed to be snow, fell on Cairo's easternmost suburbs on 13 December 2013, the first time Cairo's area had received this kind of precipitation in many decades. Dew points in the hottest months range from 13.9 °C (57 °F) in June to 18.3 °C (65 °F) in August.

Climate data for Cairo (Cairo International Airport), 1991–2020 normals
Month	Jan	Feb	Mar	Apr	May	Jun	Jul	Aug	Sep	Oct	Nov	Dec	Year
Record high °C (°F)	31.0 (87.8)	34.8 (94.6)	39.6 (103.3)	43.2 (109.8)	47.8 (118.0)	46.4 (115.5)	44.3 (111.7)	43.4 (110.1)	43.7 (110.7)	41.0 (105.8)	37.4 (99.3)	31.7 (89.1)	47.8 (118.0)
Mean maximum °C (°F)	26.2 (79.2)	29.4 (84.9)	34.6 (94.3)	38.9 (102.0)	42.8 (109.0)	42.4 (108.3)	40.5 (104.9)	39.8 (103.6)	38.7 (101.7)	35.8 (96.4)	31.4 (88.5)	27.2 (81.0)	44.2 (111.6)
Mean daily maximum °C (°F)	18.9 (66.0)	20.5 (68.9)	23.8 (74.8)	28.1 (82.6)	32.2 (90.0)	34.6 (94.3)	35.0 (95.0)	34.9 (94.8)	33.4 (92.1)	30.0 (86.0)	24.9 (76.8)	20.5 (68.9)	28.1 (82.6)
Daily mean °C (°F)	14.4 (57.9)	15.6 (60.1)	18.3 (64.9)	21.8 (71.2)	25.6 (78.1)	28.2 (82.8)	29.1 (84.4)	29.2 (84.6)	27.6 (81.7)	24.6 (76.3)	20.0 (68.0)	15.9 (60.6)	22.5 (72.5)
Mean daily minimum °C (°F)	10.1 (50.2)	11.0 (51.8)	13.2 (55.8)	15.9 (60.6)	19.3 (66.7)	22.2 (72.0)	23.8 (74.8)	24.3 (75.7)	22.7 (72.9)	20.0 (68.0)	15.6 (60.1)	11.7 (53.1)	17.5 (63.5)
Mean minimum °C (°F)	5.4 (41.7)	6.0 (42.8)	7.6 (45.7)	10.4 (50.7)	14.3 (57.7)	18.2 (64.8)	20.3 (68.5)	20.6 (69.1)	17.9 (64.2)	14.5 (58.1)	10.2 (50.4)	6.8 (44.2)	4.3 (39.7)
Record low °C (°F)	1.2 (34.2)	3.6 (38.5)	5.0 (41.0)	7.6 (45.7)	12.3 (54.1)	16.0 (60.8)	18.2 (64.8)	19.0 (66.2)	14.5 (58.1)	12.3 (54.1)	5.2 (41.4)	3.0 (37.4)	1.2 (34.2)
Average precipitation mm (inches)	4.8 (0.19)	3.8 (0.15)	6.3 (0.25)	1.3 (0.05)	0.2 (0.01)	0 (0)	0 (0)	0 (0)	0 (0)	0.7 (0.03)	4.3 (0.17)	3.4 (0.13)	24.8 (0.98)
Average precipitation days (≥ 1.0 mm)	1.3	2.0	1.2	1.3	0.6	0.6	0.7	1.0	0.7	0.1	0.6	0.8	11.0
Average relative humidity (%)	59	54	53	47	46	49	58	61	60	60	61	61	56
Average dew point °C (°F)	5.2 (41.4)	5.0 (41.0)	6.1 (43.0)	7.5 (45.5)	10.1 (50.2)	13.9 (57.0)	17.5 (63.5)	18.3 (64.9)	16.7 (62.1)	14.0 (57.2)	10.7 (51.3)	6.7 (44.1)	11.0 (51.8)
Mean monthly sunshine hours	213	234	269	291	324	357	363	351	311	292	248	198	3,451
Percentage possible sunshine	66	75	73	75	77	85	84	86	84	82	78	62	77
Average ultraviolet index	4	5	7	9	10	11.5	11.5	11	9	7	5	3	7.8
Source 1: NOAA (humidity, dew point, records 1961–1990)
Source 2: Danish Meteorological Institute for sunshine (1931–1960) and Weather2Travel (ultraviolet)Egyptian Meteorological Authority / NOAA

=== Metropolitan area and districts ===
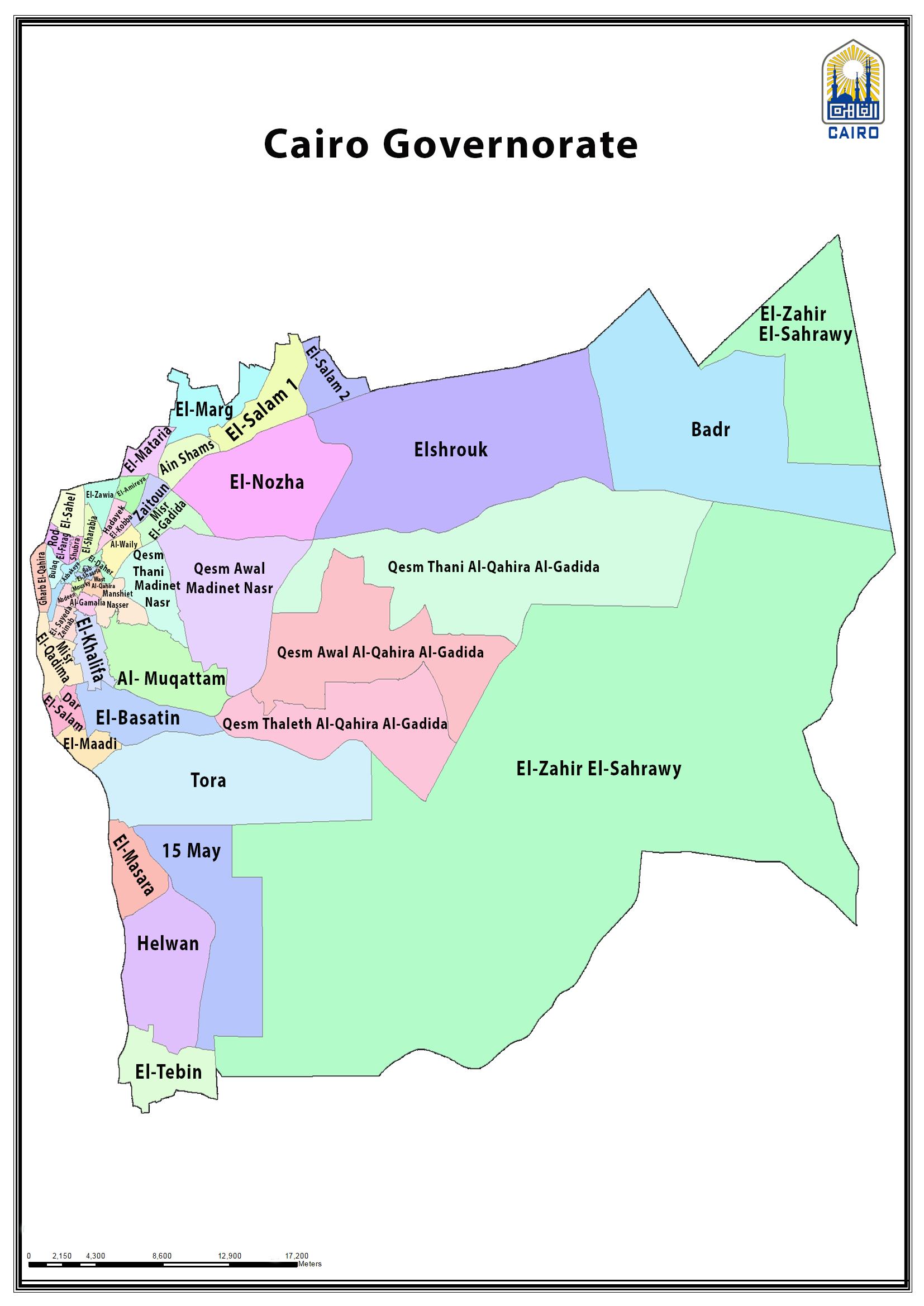
Cairo city administrative boundary and districts in English

The city of Cairo forms part of Greater Cairo, the largest metropolitan area in Africa. While it has no administrative body, the Ministry of Planning considers it as an economic region consisting of Cairo Governorate, Giza Governorate, and Qalyubia Governorate. As a contiguous metropolitan area, various studies have considered Greater Cairo be composed of the administrative cities that are Cairo, Giza and Shubra al-Kheima, in addition to the satellite cities/new towns surrounding them.

Cairo is a city-state where the governor is also the head of the city. Cairo City itself differs from other Egyptian cities in that it has an extra administrative division between the city and district levels, and that is areas, which are headed by deputy governors. Cairo consists of four areas (manatiq, singl. mantiqa) divided into 38 districts (ahya', singl. hayy) and 46 qisms (police wards, 1-2 per district):

The Northern Area is divided into eight districts:

- Shubra
- Al-Zawiya al-Hamra
- Hadayek al-Qubba
- Rod al-Farg
- Al-Sharabia
- Al-Sahel
- Al-Zeitoun
- Al-Amiriyya

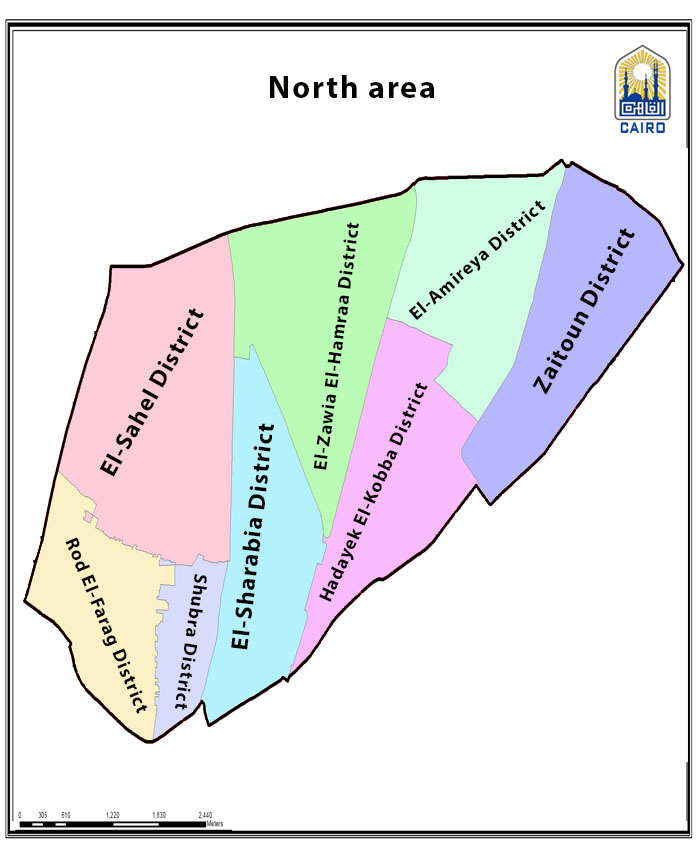
Map of Northern Area, Cairo (En)

The Eastern Area is divided into nine districts and three new cities:

- Misr al-Gadidah and Al-Nozha (Heliopolis)
- Nasr City East and Nasr City West
- Al-Salam 1 (Awwal) and al-Salam 2 (Than)
- Ain Shams
- Al-Matariya
- Al-Marg
- Shorouk (Under jurisdiction of NUCA)
- Badr (Under jurisdiction of NUCA)
- Al-Qahira al-Gadida (New Cairo, three qisms, under jurisdiction of NUCA)

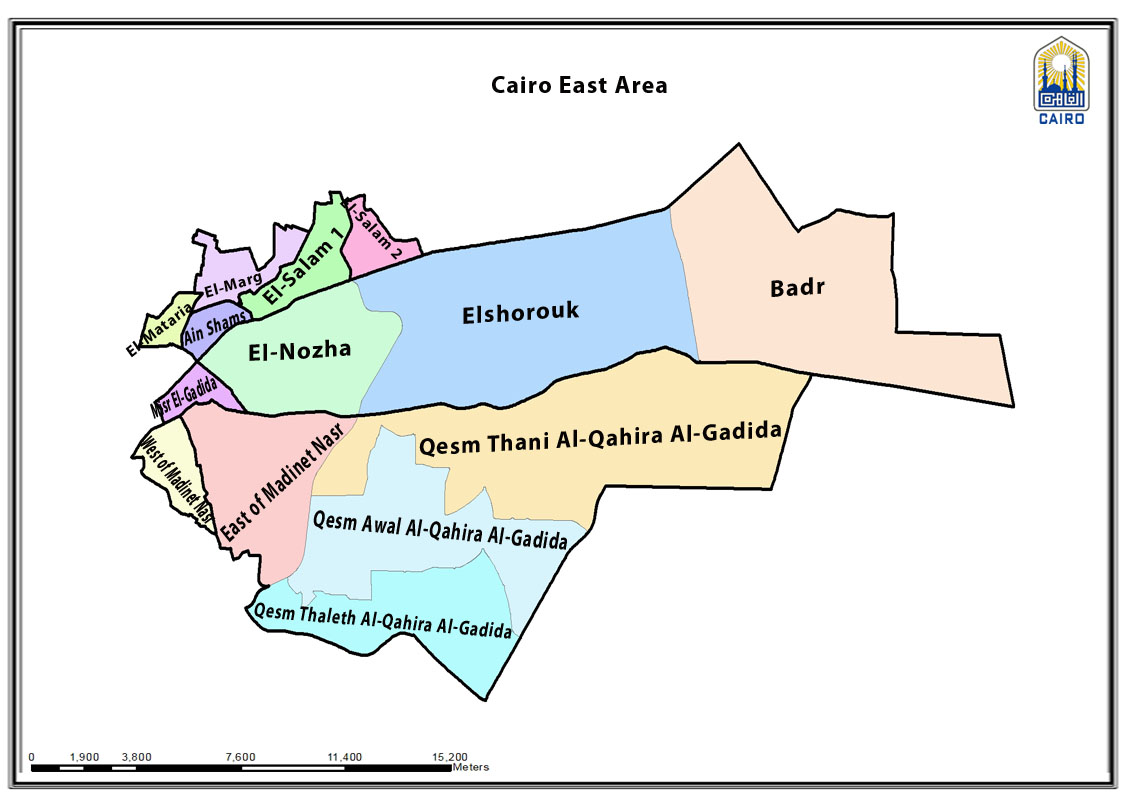
Cairo Eastern Area map

The Western Area is divided into nine districts:

- Manshiyat Nasser
- Al-Wayli (Incl. qism al-Daher)
- Wasat al-Qahira (Central Cairo, incl. Al-Darb al-Ahmar, al-Gamaliyya qisms)
- Bulaq
- Gharb al-Qahira (West Cairo, incl. Zamalek qism, Qasr al-Nil qism incl. Garden City and part of Down Town)
- Abdeen
- Al-Azbakiya
- Al-Muski
- Bab al-Sha'aria

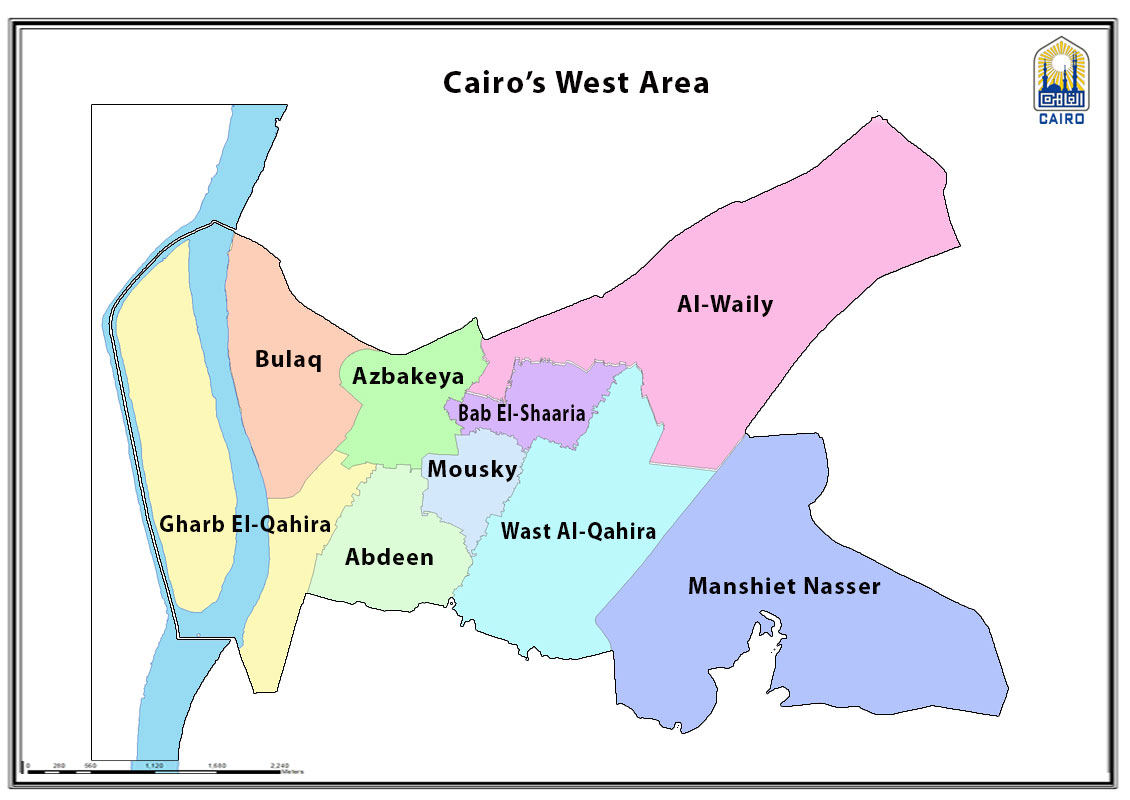
Cairo Western Area map

The Southern Area is divided into 12 districts:

- Masr El-Qadima (Old Cairo, including Al-Manial)
- Al-Khalifa
- Al-Moqattam
- Al-Basatin
- Dar al-Salam
- Sayyidah Zainab District
- El Tebbin
- Helwan
- Al-Ma'sara
- Al-Maadi
- Tora
- 15th of May (Under jurisdiction of NUCA)

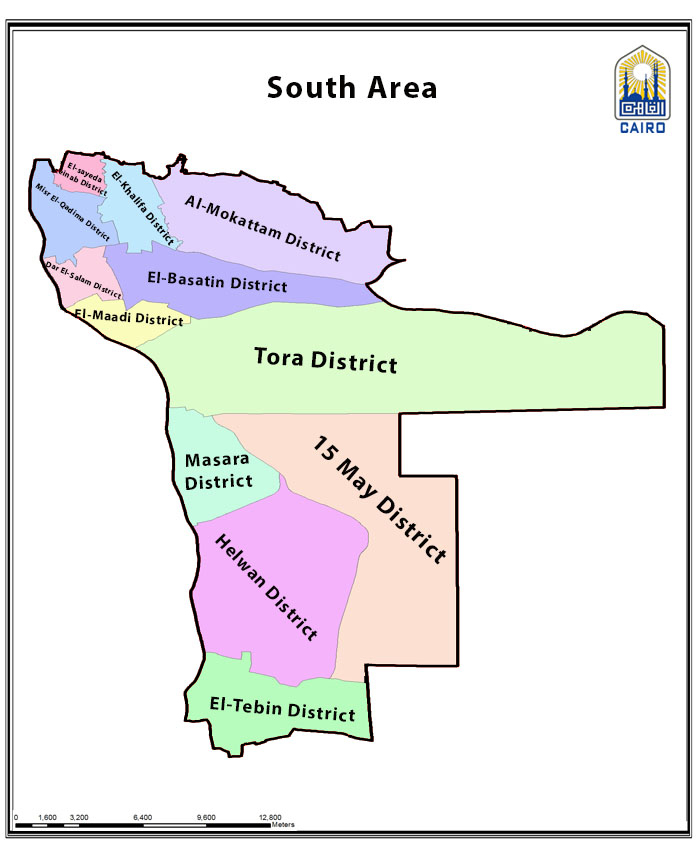
Cairo Southern Area map

==== Satellite cities ====
Since 1977 a number of new towns have been planned and built by the New Urban Communities Authority (NUCA) in the Eastern Desert around Cairo, ostensibly to accommodate additional population growth and development of the city and stem the development of self-built informal areas, especially over agricultural land. As of 2022, four new towns have been built and have residential populations: 15th of May City, Badr City, Shorouk City, and New Cairo. In addition, two more are under construction: the New Administrative Capital and Capital Gardens, where land was allocated in 2021, which will house most of the civil servants employed in the new capital.

==== Planned new capital ====
In March 2015, plans were announced for a new city to be built east of Cairo in an undeveloped area of the Cairo Governorate, which would serve as the New Administrative Capital of Egypt. Cairo also introduced more modern metro lines to reduce traffic in central areas.

== Demographics ==
Historical population
Year	Pop.	±% p.a.
1884	352,416	—
1907	654,476	+2.73%
1950	2,493,514	+3.16%
1960	3,680,160	+3.97%
1970	5,584,507	+4.26%
1980	7,348,778	+2.78%
1990	9,892,143	+3.02%
2000	13,625,565	+3.25%
2010	16,899,015	+2.18%
2019	20,484,965	+2.16%
Source: Decennial census. For Cairo agglomeration:

According to the 2017 census, Cairo had a population of 9,539,673 people, distributed across 46 qisms (police wards):

Qism	Code 2017	Total population	Male	Female
El Tibbin	010100	72,040	36,349	35,691
Helwan	010200	521,239	265,347	255,892
Al Maasara	010300	270,032	137,501	132,531
15 May City	010400	93,574	49,437	44,137
Tura	010500	230,438	168,152	62,286
Maadi	010600	88,575	43,972	44,603
El Basatin	010700	495,443	260,756	234,687
Dar El Salam	010800	525,638	273,603	252,035
Masr El Qedima	010900	250,313	129,582	120,731
El Sayeda Zeinab	011000	136,278	68,571	67,707
El Khalifa	011100	105,235	54,150	51,085
Mokattam	011200	224,138	116,011	108,127
Manshiyat Naser	011300	258,372	133,864	124,508
Al Darb Al Ahmar	011400	58,489	30,307	28,182
El Muski	011500	16,662	8,216	8,446
Abdeen	011600	40,321	19,352	20,969
Garden City	011700	10,563	4,951	5,612
Zamalek	011800	14,946	7,396	7,550
Bulaq	011900	48,147	24,105	24,042
Azbakeya	012000	19,763	9,766	9,997
Bab El Shariya	012100	46,673	24,261	22,412
El Gamaliya	012200	36,368	18,487	17,881
Al Daher	012300	71,870	35,956	35,914
Al Wayli	012400	79,292	39,407	39,885
Hadayek El Qobbah	012500	316,072	161,269	154,803
El Sharabiya	012600	187,201	94,942	92,259
Shubra	012700	76,695	38,347	38,348
Rod El Farag	012800	145,632	72,859	72,773
El Sahel	012900	316,421	162,063	154,358
El Zawya El Hamra	013000	318,170	162,304	155,866
Amairiya	013100	152,554	77,355	75,199
Zeitoun	013200	174,176	87,235	86,941
El Matareya	013300	602,485	312,407	290,078
Ain Shams	013400	614,391	315,394	298,997
El Marg	013500	798,646	412,476	386,170
El Salam 1	013600	480,721	249,639	231,082
El Salam 2	013700	153,772	80,492	73,280
El Nozha	013800	231,241	117,910	113,331
Heliopolis	013900	134,116	68,327	65,789
Nasr City 1	014000	634,818	332,117	302,701
Nasr City 2	014100	72,182	38,374	33,808
New Cairo 1	014200	135,834	70,765	65,069
New Cairo 2	014300	90,668	46,102	44,566
New Cairo 3	014400	70,885	37,340	33,545
El Shorouk	014500	87,285	45,960	41,325
Badr City	014600	31,299	17,449	13,850

=== Religion ===
The majority of Egypt and Cairo's population is Sunni Muslim. A significant Christian minority exists, among whom Coptic Orthodox are the majority. Precise numbers for each religious community in Egypt are not available and estimates vary. Other churches that have, or had, a presence in modern Cairo include the Catholic Church (including Armenian Catholic, Coptic Catholic, Chaldean Catholic, Syrian Catholic, and Maronite), the Greek Orthodox Church, the Evangelical Church of Egypt (Synod of the Nile), and some Protestant churches. Cairo has been the seat of the Coptic Orthodox Church since the 12th century, and the seat of the Coptic Orthodox Pope is located in Saint Mark's Coptic Orthodox Cathedral.

Benjamin of Tudela reported that Cairo had 7,000 Jews in 1170. Until the 20th century, Cairo had a sizeable Jewish community, but as of 2022 only three Jews were reported to be living in the city. A total of 12 synagogues in Cairo still exist.

== Economy ==
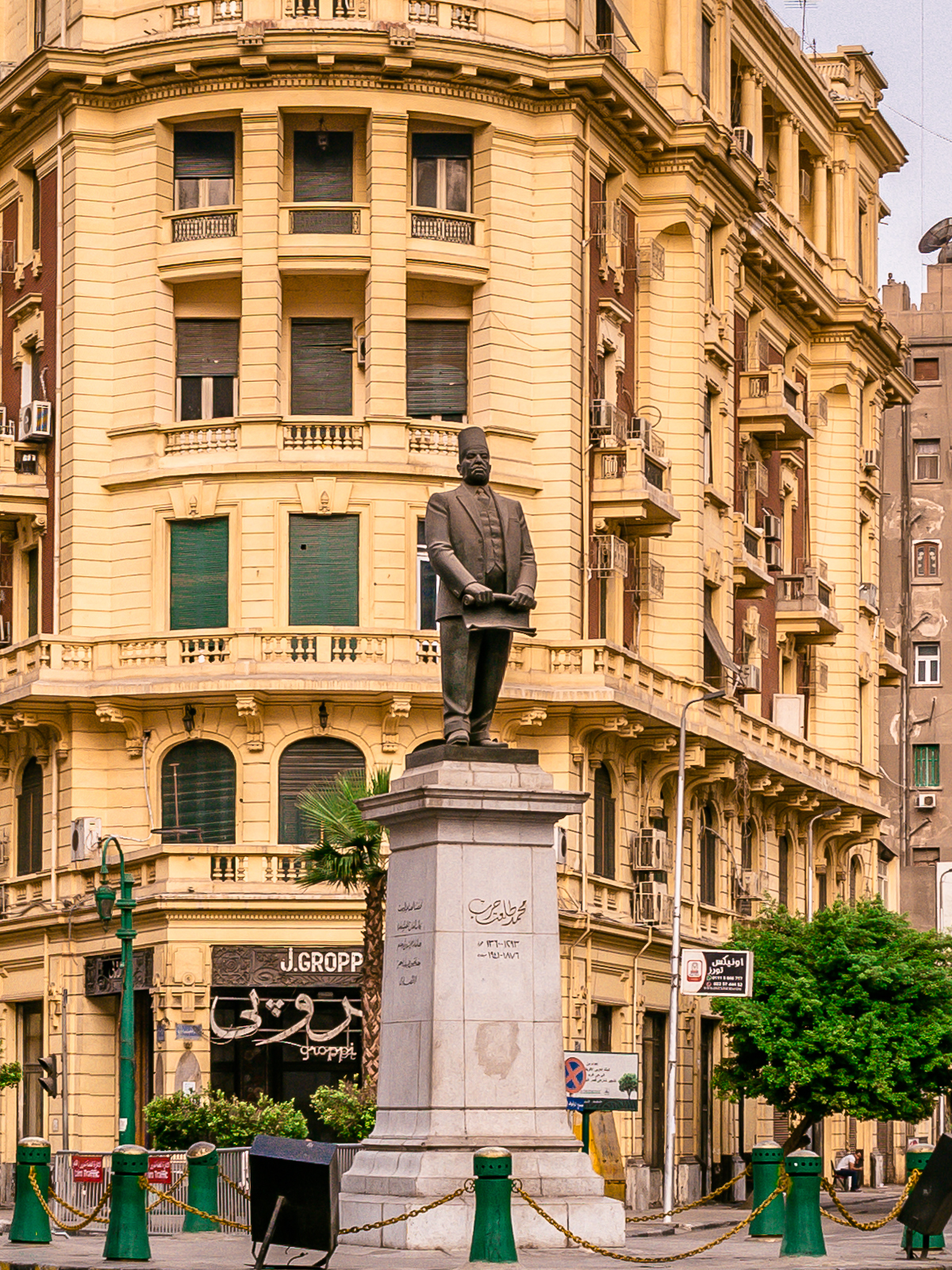
Statue of Talaat Pasha Harb, the father of the modern Egyptian economy, in Downtown Cairo

Cairo's economy has traditionally been based on governmental institutions and services, with the modern productive sector expanding in the 20th century to include developments in textiles and food processing – specifically the production of sugar cane. As of 2005, Egypt has the largest non-oil based GDP in the Arab world.

Cairo accounts for 11% of Egypt's population and 22% of its economy (PPP). The majority of the nation's commerce is generated there, or passes through the city. The great majority of publishing houses and media outlets and nearly all film studios are there, as are half of the nation's hospital beds and universities. This has fuelled rapid construction in the city, with one building in five being less than 15 years old.

According to the WIPO Innovation Cluster Ranking, the Cairo area is one of the top 100 leading science and technology clusters in the world, ranking 83rd overall in 2025 and 86th in 2026.

This growth until recently surged well ahead of city services. Homes, roads, electricity, telephone and sewer services were all in short supply. Analysts trying to grasp the magnitude of the change coined terms like "hyper-urbanization".

=== Automobile manufacturers from Cairo ===
- Arab American Vehicles Company (vehicles by Stellantis alliance)
- Egyptian Light Transport Manufacturing Company (Egyptian NSU pedant)
- Ghabbour Group (Fuso, Hyundai and Volvo)
- MCV Corporate Group (a part of the Daimler AG)
- Mod Car
- Seoudi Group (Modern Motors: Nissan, BMW [formerly]; El-Mashreq: Alfa Romeo and Fiat)
- Speranza (former Daewoo Motors Egypt; Chery, Daewoo)
- General Motors Egypt

== Infrastructure ==
=== Health ===
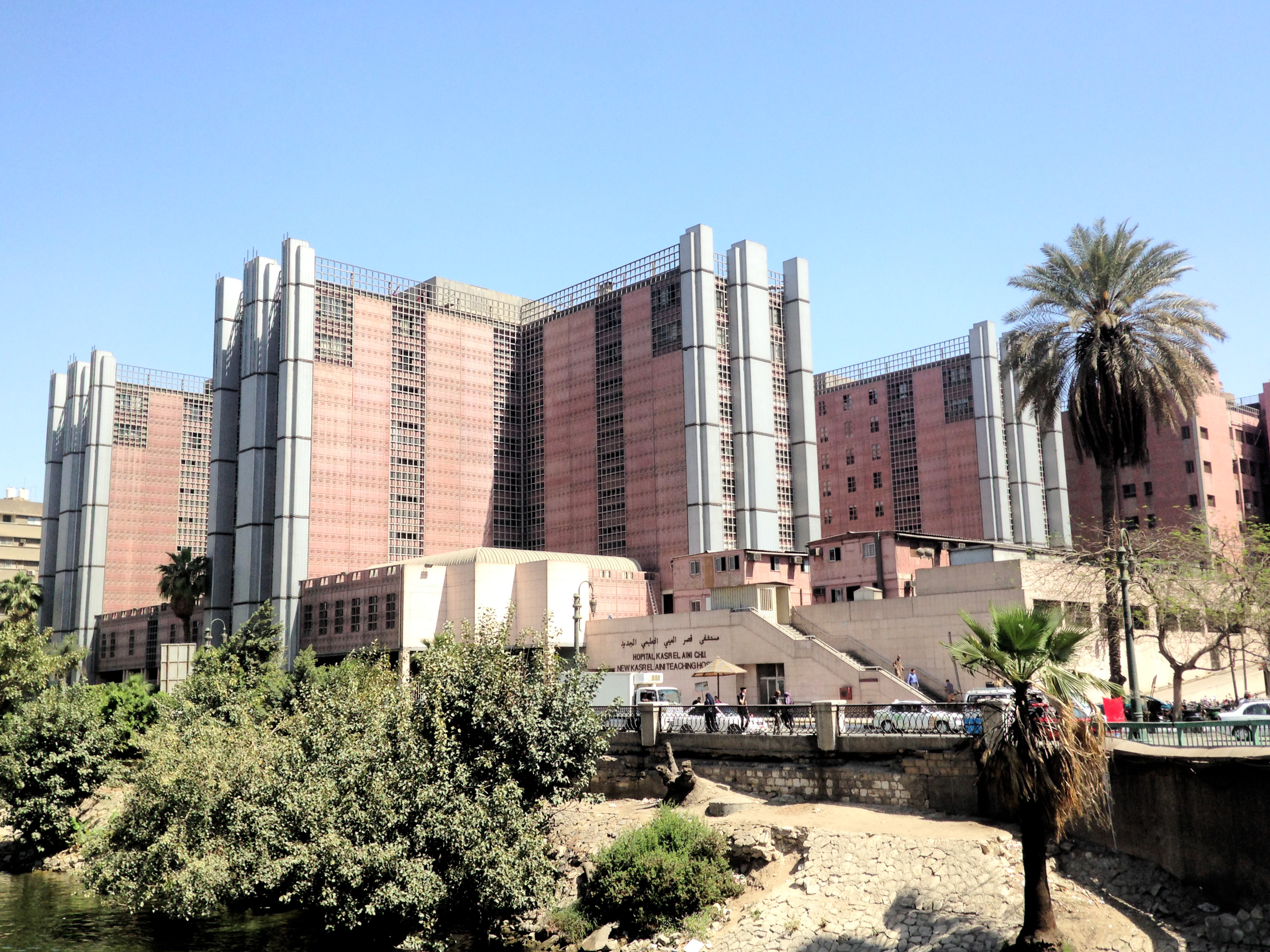
The Qasr El Eyni Hospital

Cairo, as well as neighbouring Giza, has been established as Egypt's main centre for medical treatment, and despite some exceptions, has the most advanced level of medical care in the country. Cairo's hospitals include the JCI-accredited As-Salaam International Hospital, Ain Shams University Hospital, Dar Al Fouad, Nile Badrawi Hospital, 57357 Hospital, and the International Medical Center.

=== Education ===
Greater Cairo has long been the hub of education and educational services for Egypt and the region.

Faculty of Engineering's managerial building, Ain Shams University

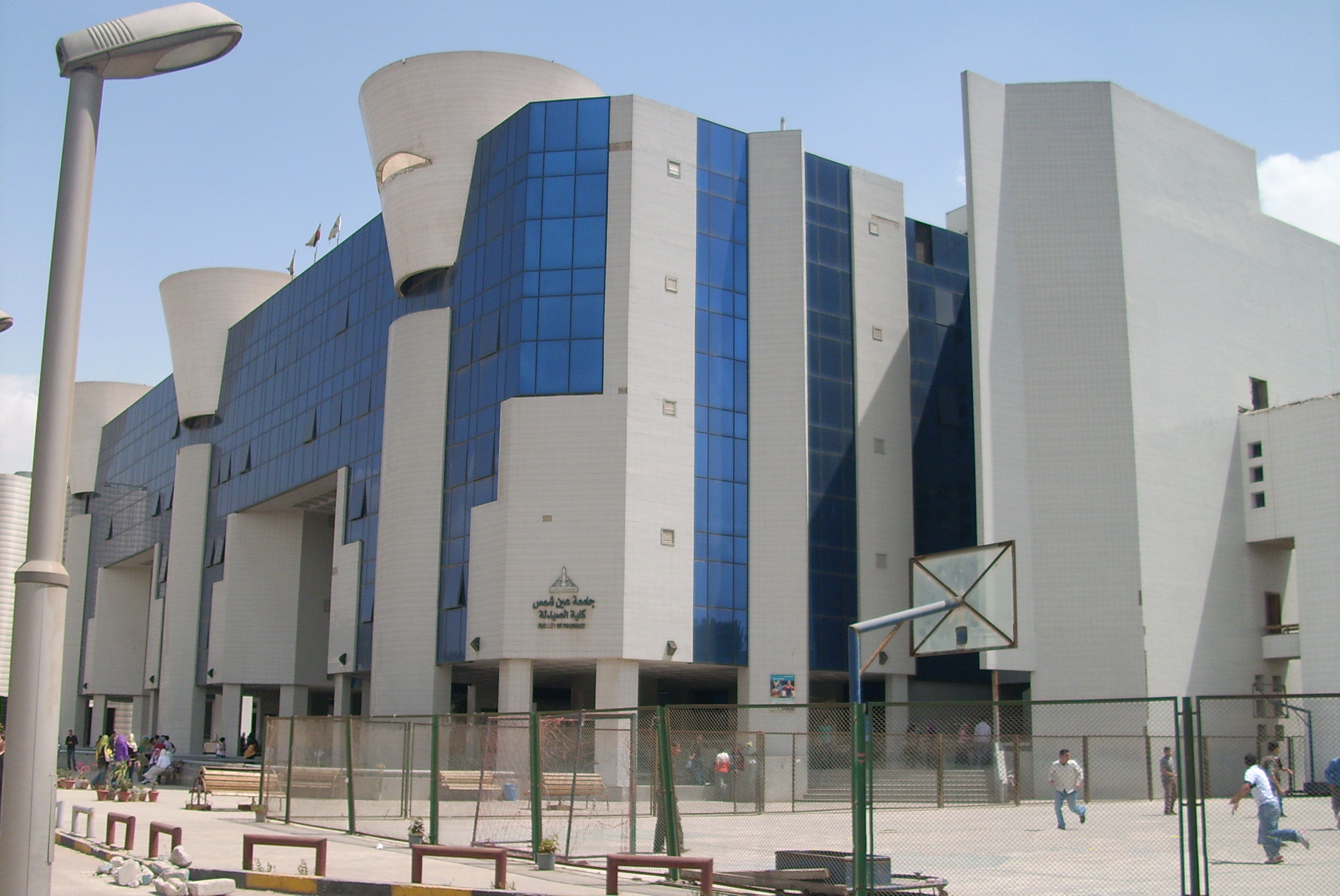
Faculty of Pharmacy, Ain Shams University

Today, Greater Cairo is the centre for many government offices governing the Egyptian educational system, has the largest number of schools and higher education institutes among other cities and governorates of Egypt.

Some of the international schools in Cairo

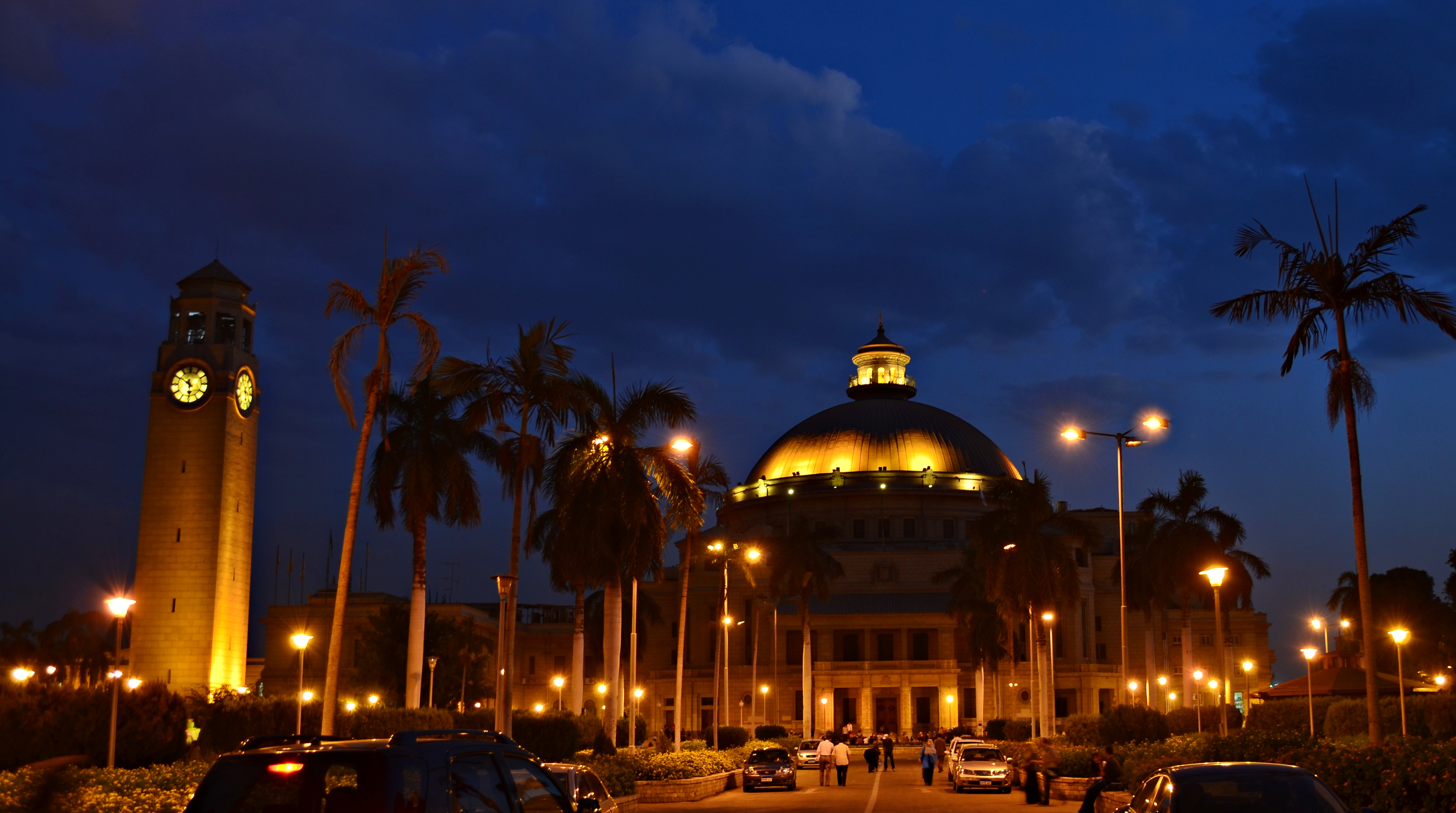
Cairo University is the largest university in Egypt, and is located in Giza.

Universities in Greater Cairo

University	Date of foundation
Al Azhar University	970–972
Cairo University	1908
American University in Cairo	1919
Ain Shams University	1950
Arab Academy for Science & Technology and Maritime Transport	1972
Helwan University	1975
Sadat Academy for Management Sciences	1981
Higher Technological Institute	1989
Modern Academy In Maadi	1993
Misr International University	1996
Misr University for Science and Technology	1996
Modern Sciences and Arts University	1996
Université Française d'Égypte	2002
German University in Cairo	2003
Arab Open University	2003
Canadian International College	2004
British University in Egypt	2005
Ahram Canadian University	2005
Nile University	2006
Future University in Egypt	2006
Egyptian Russian University	2006
Heliopolis University for Sustainable Development	2009
New Giza University	2016

== Transport ==
=== Air ===
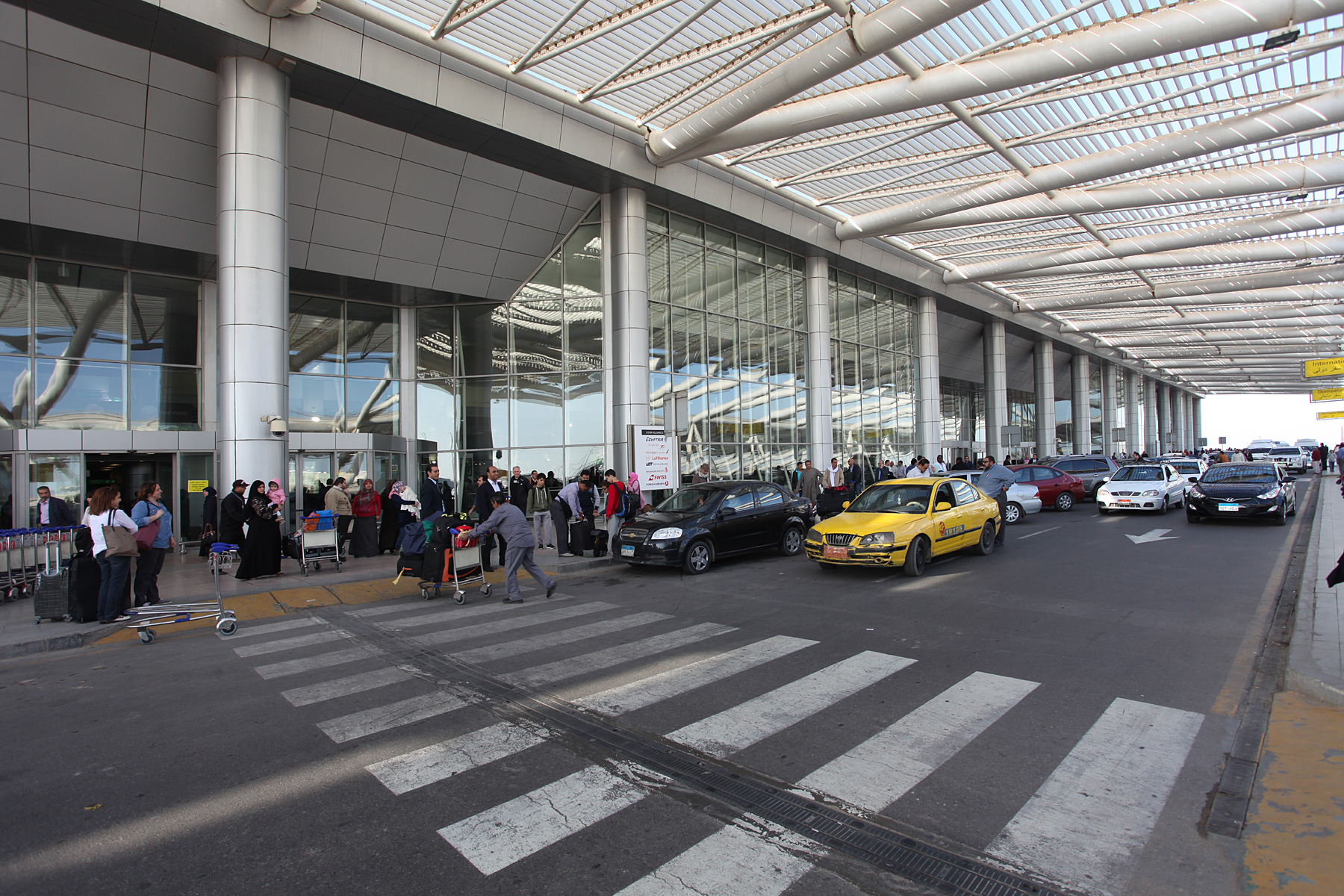
Façade of Terminal 3 at Cairo International Airport

The largest airport in Egypt, Cairo International Airport, is located near in the Heliopolis district and is accessible by car, taxi and bus. The third line of the Cairo Metro, opened in 2012, was originally planned to reach the Airport, but those plans were cancelled in mid-2020 in place of a future shuttle bus system that runs directly from Adly Mansour Station to the Airport.

=== Public transportation ===
==== Metro ====
The Cairo Transportation Authority (CTA) manages Cairo's public transit and runs the Cairo Metro. The metro network covers Helwan and other suburbs. It can get very crowded during rush hour. Two train cars (the fourth and fifth ones) are reserved for women only, although women may ride in any car they want. Trams in Greater Cairo and Cairo trolleybus were used as modes of transportation, but were closed in the 1970s everywhere except Heliopolis and Helwan. These were shut down in 2014, after the Egyptian Revolution.

In 2022, the Cairo Light Rail Transit system opened. Despite the name, the CLRT is more like a commuter rail system than a Light Rail system. As of 2025, the system consists of a single bifurcating line of 12 stations over 70 km, with a top speed of 120 km/h. In 2017, plans to construct two monorail systems were announced, one linking 6th of October to suburban Giza, a distance of 35 km (22 mi), and the other linking Nasr City to New Cairo, a distance of 52 km (32 mi).

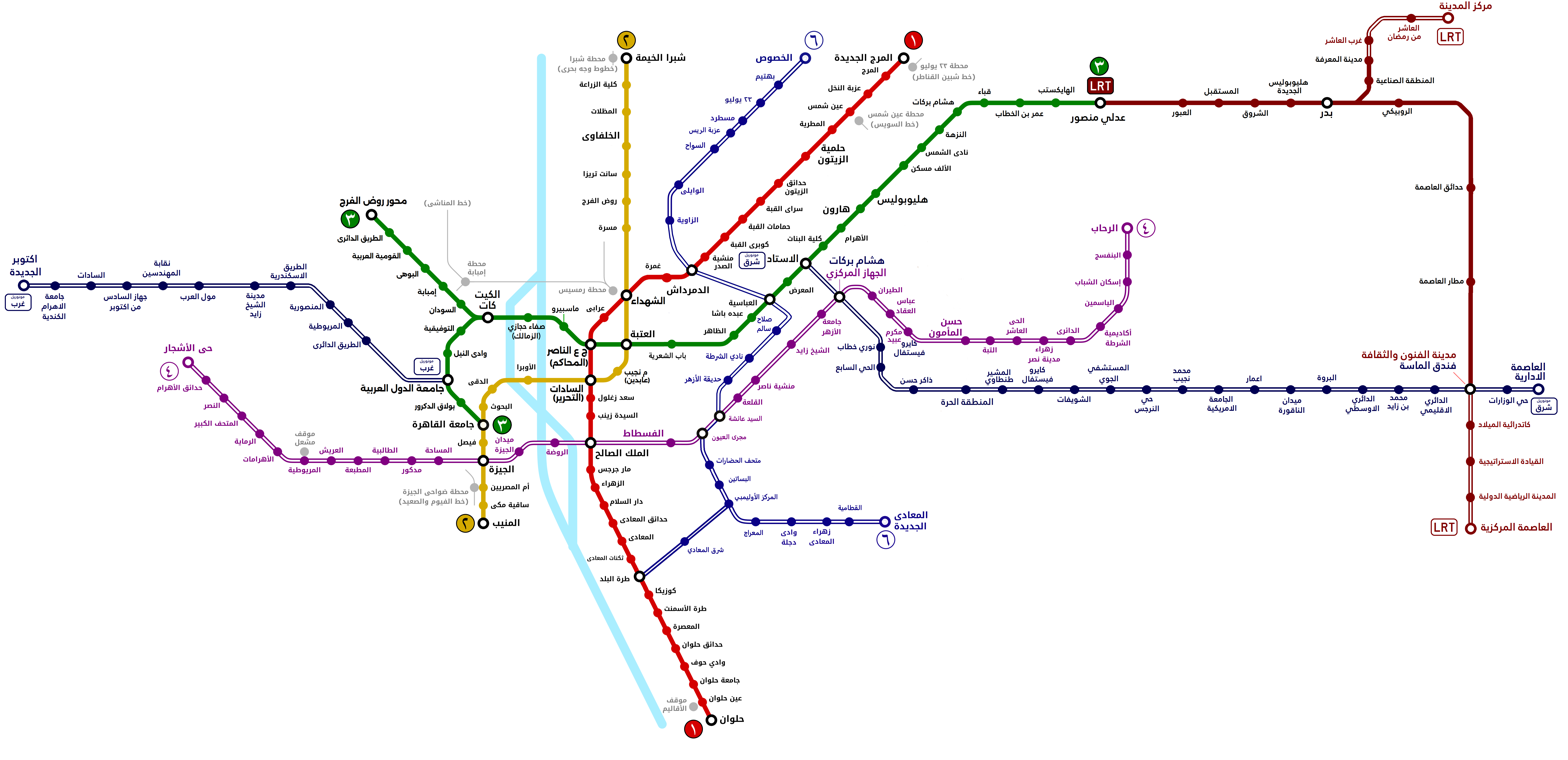
Cairo Metro, LRT, BRT and monorail expansion plans

==== Monorail ====
In 2015, plans to construct two monorail systems were announced, one of which linking 6 October City to suburban Giza, a distance of 42 km, and the other linking Nasr City to New Cairo, a distance of 54 km. They will be Egypt's first monorail systems. In May 2019, the contract to build 70 four-car trains was awarded to Bombardier Transportation with assembly to take place at its Derby Litchurch Lane Works in England. Delivery of the trains is expected between 2021 and 2024. The network is to be built by Orascom Construction and Arab Contractors.

==== Bus system ====
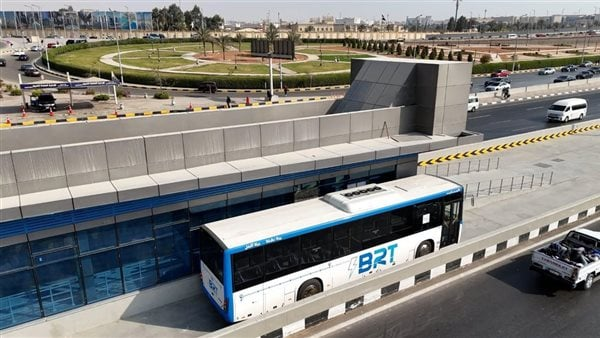
An Egyptian-made Cairo BRT bus on Cairo's Ring Road

There are two types of buses in Cairo, those run by the Cairo Transport Authority, and those run by private companies, with the latter using smaller minibuses. Bus lines are spread all over the Greater Cairo area, and are considered the main mean of transport in the city for many Cairenes.

=== Train ===
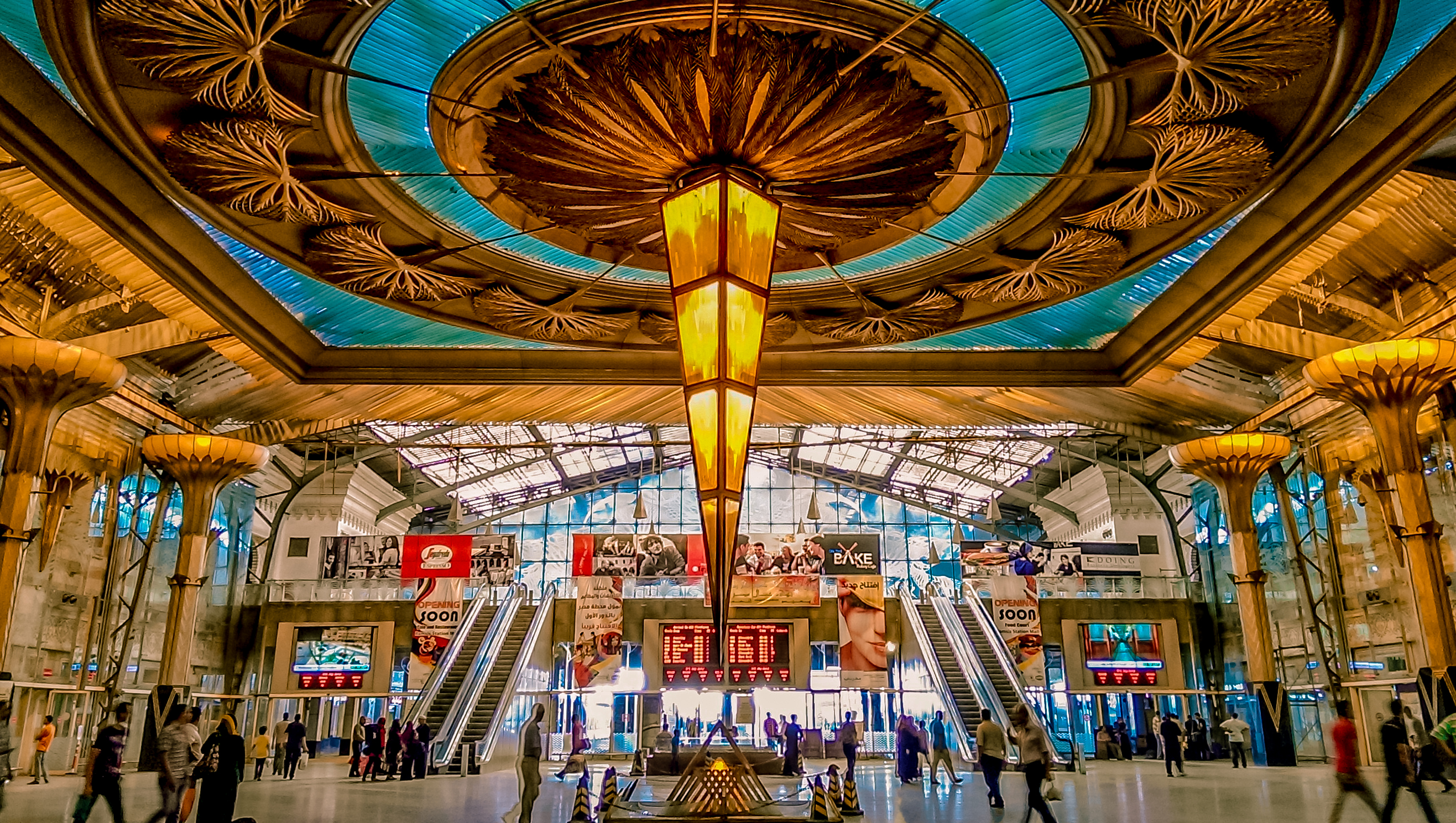
The interior of Ramses Station

Cairo, specifically Ramses Station located on Midan Ramses, is the centre of almost the entire Egyptian transportation network. Cairo is extensively connected to other Egyptian cities and villages by rail operated by the Egyptian National Railways.

=== Road System ===
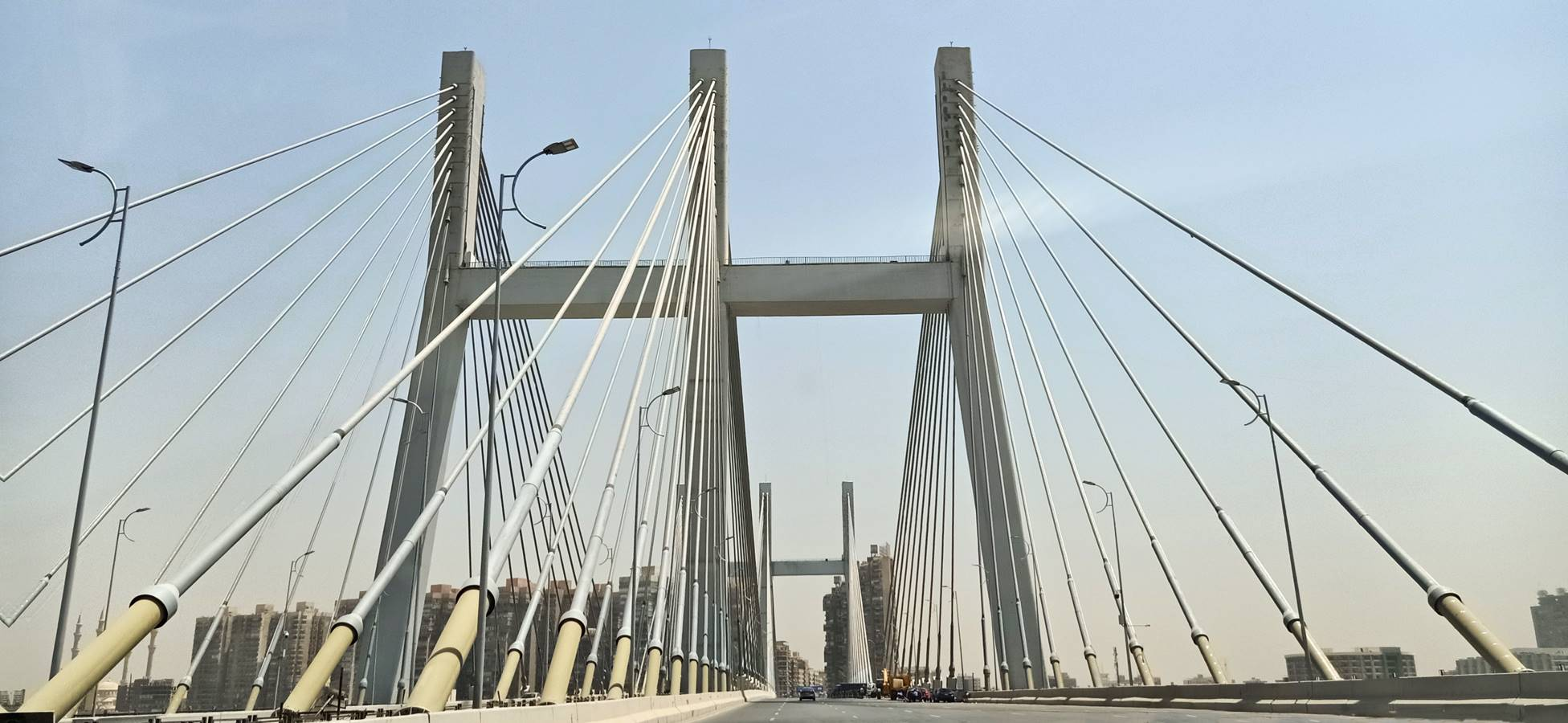
Rod El Farag Axis Bridge in Cairo

Two trans-African automobile routes originate in Cairo: the Cairo-Cape Town Highway and the Cairo-Dakar Highway. An extensive road network connects Cairo with other Egyptian cities and villages. There is a new Ring Road that surrounds the outskirts of the city, with exits that reach outer Cairo districts. There are flyovers and bridges, such as the 6th October Bridge that, when the traffic is not heavy, allow fast means of transportation from one side of the city to the other.

Cairo traffic is known to be overwhelming and overcrowded. Traffic moves at a relatively fluid pace. Drivers tend to be aggressive, but are more courteous at junctions, taking turns alternating, with police aiding in traffic control of some congested areas.

=== Taxis ===
Cairo is served by its "white taxis" which were introduced in the early 2010s and aren't run by a company, but rather by individuals. These taxis have plummeted in popularity due to factors such as drivers not turning on their meters and instead demanding a fare which is usually considerably inflated, and other problems such as the lack of air-conditioning.

=== Other forms of transport ===
- Bolt
- Cairo Nile Ferry
- Careem
- DiDi
- Uber

== Culture ==
=== Theatre ===
==== Cairo Opera House ====
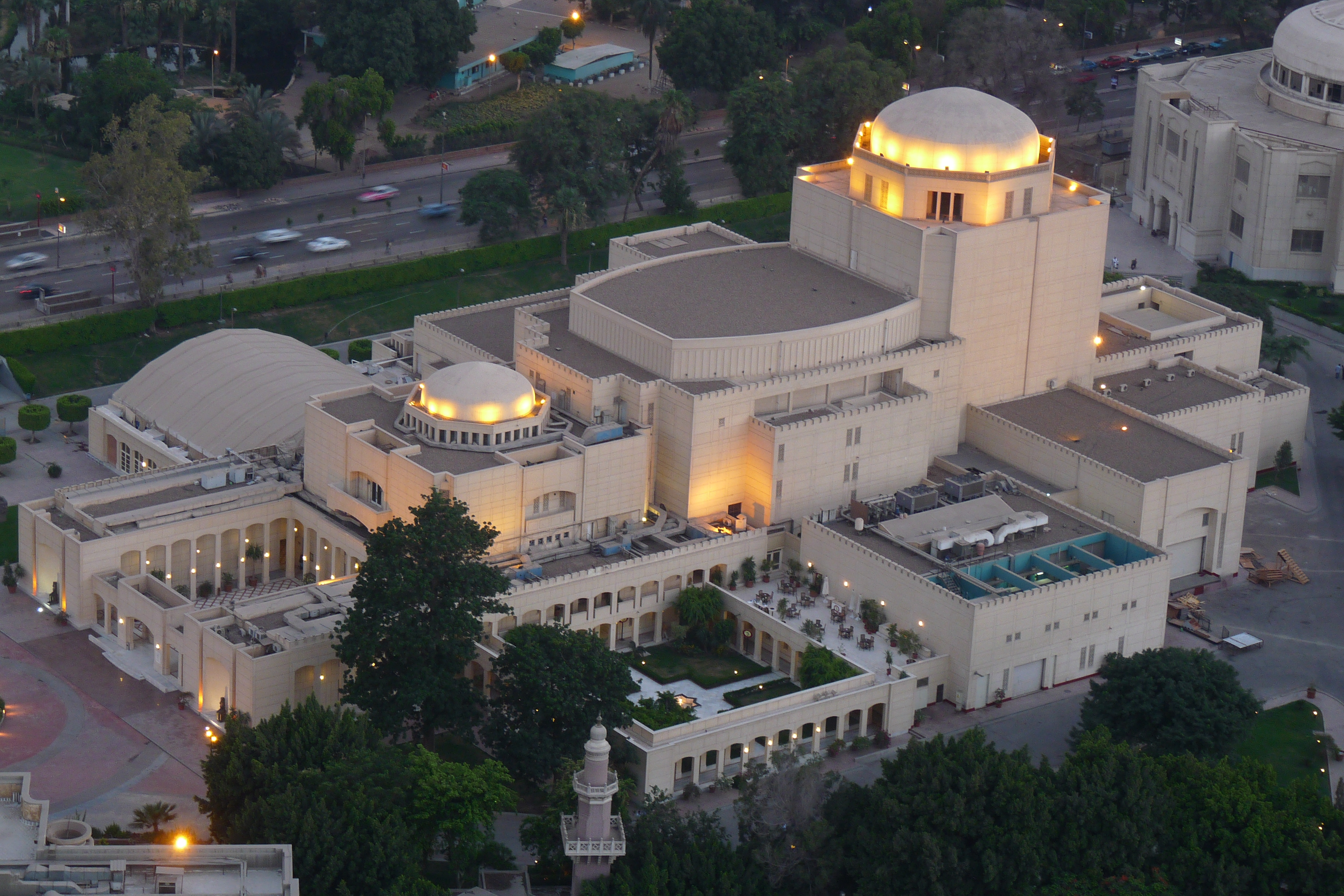
Cairo Opera House, at the National Cultural Center, Zamalek district

President Mubarak inaugurated the new Cairo Opera House of the Egyptian National Cultural Centres on 10 October 1988, 17 years after the Royal Opera House had been destroyed by fire. The National Cultural Centre was built with the help of JICA, the Japan International Co-operation Agency and stands as a prominent feature for the Japanese-Egyptian co-operation and the friendship between the two nations.

==== Egyptian Royal Opera House ====
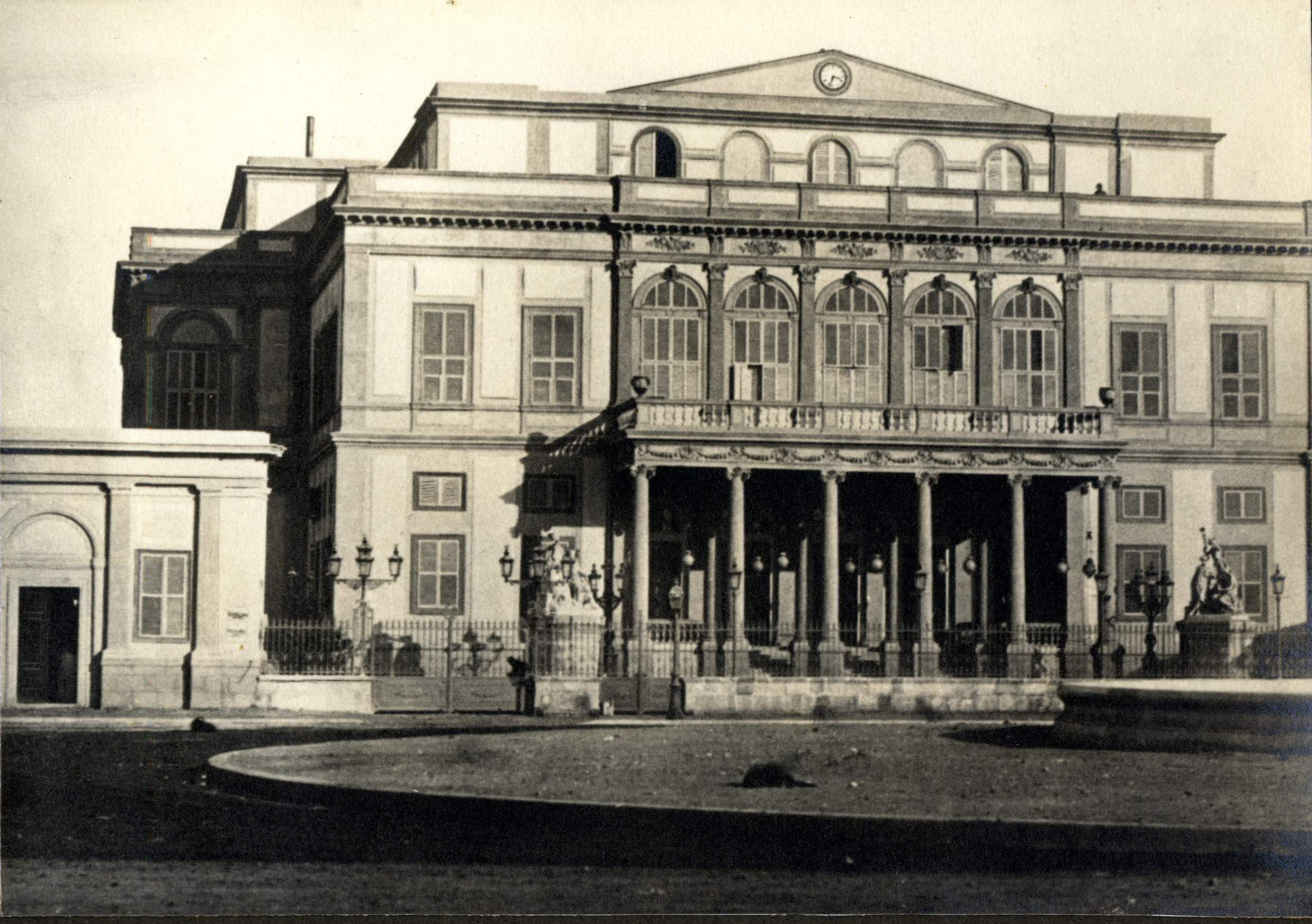
Egyptian Royal Opera House, 1869

The Egyptian Royal Opera House, or Royal Opera House, was the original opera house in Cairo. It was dedicated on 1 November 1869, and burned down on 28 October 1971. After the original opera house was destroyed, Cairo was without an opera house for nearly two decades until the opening of the Cairo Opera House in 1988.

==== Cairo International Film Festival ====
Cairo held its first international film festival 16 August 1976, when the first Cairo International Film Festival was launched by the Egyptian Association of Film Writers and Critics, headed by Kamal El-Mallakh. The association ran the festival for seven years until 1983.

This achievement led to the president of the festival again contacting the FIAPF with the request that a competition should be included at the 1991 festival. The request was granted.

In 1998, the festival took place under the presidency of one of Egypt's leading actors, Hussein Fahmy, who was appointed by the Minister of Culture, Farouk Hosni, after the death of Saad El-Din Wahba. Four years later, the journalist and writer Cherif El-Shoubashy became president.

=== Cairo Geniza ===
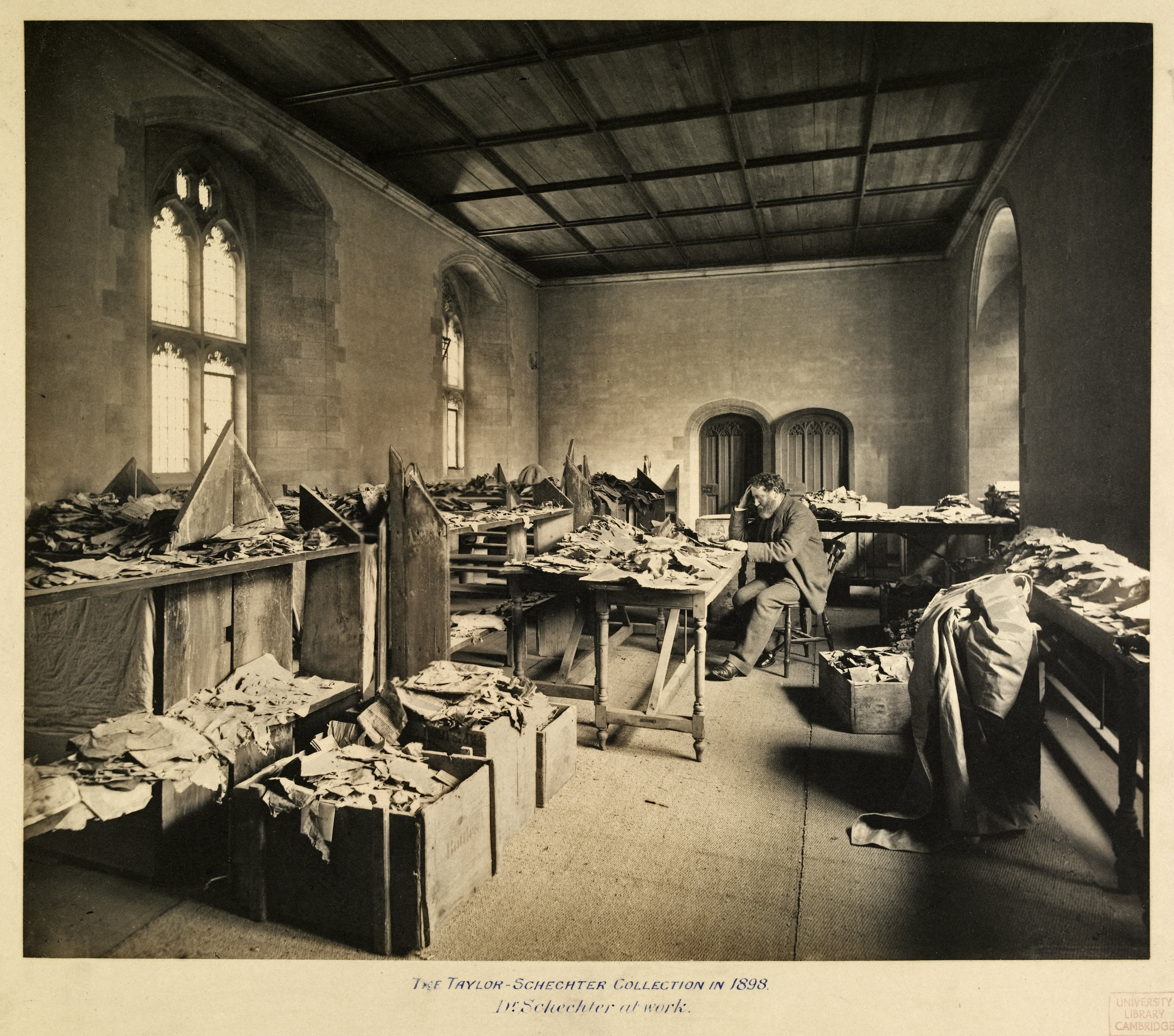
Solomon Schechter at work in Cambridge University Library, studying the fragments of the Cairo Geniza, c. 1898

The Cairo Geniza is an accumulation of almost 200,000 Jewish manuscripts that were found in the genizah of the Ben Ezra Synagogue (built 882) of Fustat, Egypt (now Old Cairo), the Basatin cemetery east of Old Cairo, and a number of old documents that were bought in Cairo in the later 19th century. These documents were written from about 870 to 1880 AD and have been archived in various American and European libraries. The Taylor-Schechter collection in the University of Cambridge runs to 140,000 manuscripts; a further 40,000 manuscripts are housed at the Jewish Theological Seminary of America.

== Sports ==
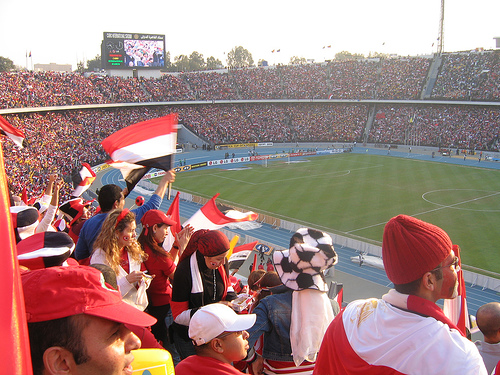
Cairo International Stadium with 75,100 seats

Football is the most popular sport in Egypt, and Cairo has sporting teams that compete in national and regional leagues, most notably Al Ahly and Zamalek SC, who were the CAF first and second African clubs of the 20th century. The annual match between Al Ahly and El Zamalek is one of the most watched sports events in Egypt. The teams form the major rivalry of Egyptian football. They play their home games at Cairo International Stadium, which is the second largest stadium in Egypt, as well as the largest in Cairo.

The Cairo International Stadium was built in 1960. Its multi-purpose sports complex houses the main football stadium, an indoor stadium, satellite fields that hold regional and continental games, including the African Games, U17 Football World Championship and the 2006 Africa Cup of Nations. Egypt later won the competition and the next edition in Ghana (2008) making the Egyptian and Ghanaian national teams the only to win the African Nations Cup back to back. Egypt won the title for a record six times in the history of African Continental Competition. This was followed by a third consecutive win in Angola in 2010, making Egypt the only country with a record 3-consecutive and 7-total Continental Football Competition winner. As of 2021, Egypt's national team is ranked #46 in the world by FIFA.

Cairo failed at the applicant stage when bidding for the 2008 Summer Olympics, which was hosted in Beijing. However, Cairo did host the 2007 Pan Arab Games.

There are other sports teams in the city that participate in several sports including Gezira Sporting Club, el Shams Club, Shooting Club, Heliopolis Sporting Club, and several smaller clubs. There are new sports clubs in the area of New Cairo (one hour far from Cairo's downtown), these are Al Zohour sporting club, Wadi Degla sporting club and Platinum Club.

Most of the sports federations of the country are located in the city suburbs, including the Egyptian Football Association. The headquarters of the Confederation of African Football (CAF) was previously located in Cairo, before relocating to its new headquarters in 6 October City, a small city away from Cairo's crowded districts. In 2008, the Egyptian Rugby Federation was officially formed and granted membership into the International Rugby Board.

Egypt is internationally known for the excellence of its squash players who excel in professional and junior divisions. Egypt has seven players in the top ten of the PSA men's world rankings, and three in the women's top ten. Mohamed El Shorbagy held the world number one position for more than a year. Nour El Sherbini has won the Women's World Championship twice and has been the women's world number one. On 30 April 2016, she became the youngest woman to win the Women's World Championship. In 2017 she retained her title.

Cairo is the official endpoint of Cross Egypt Challenge where its route ends yearly in the most sacred place in Egypt, under the Great Pyramids of Giza with a huge trophy-giving ceremony.

== Cityscape and landmarks ==
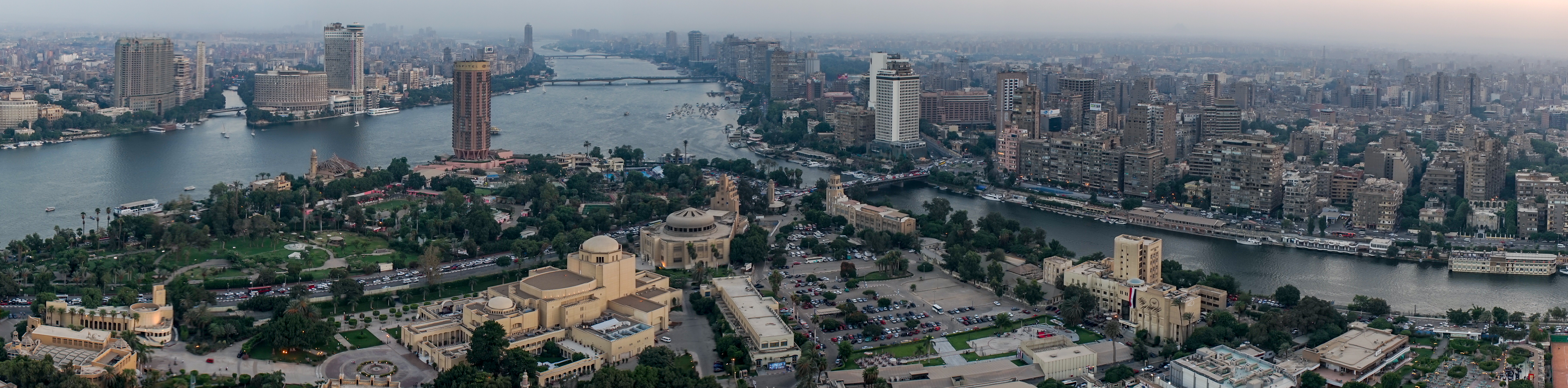
Cityscape of the banks of the Nile

=== Downtown ===
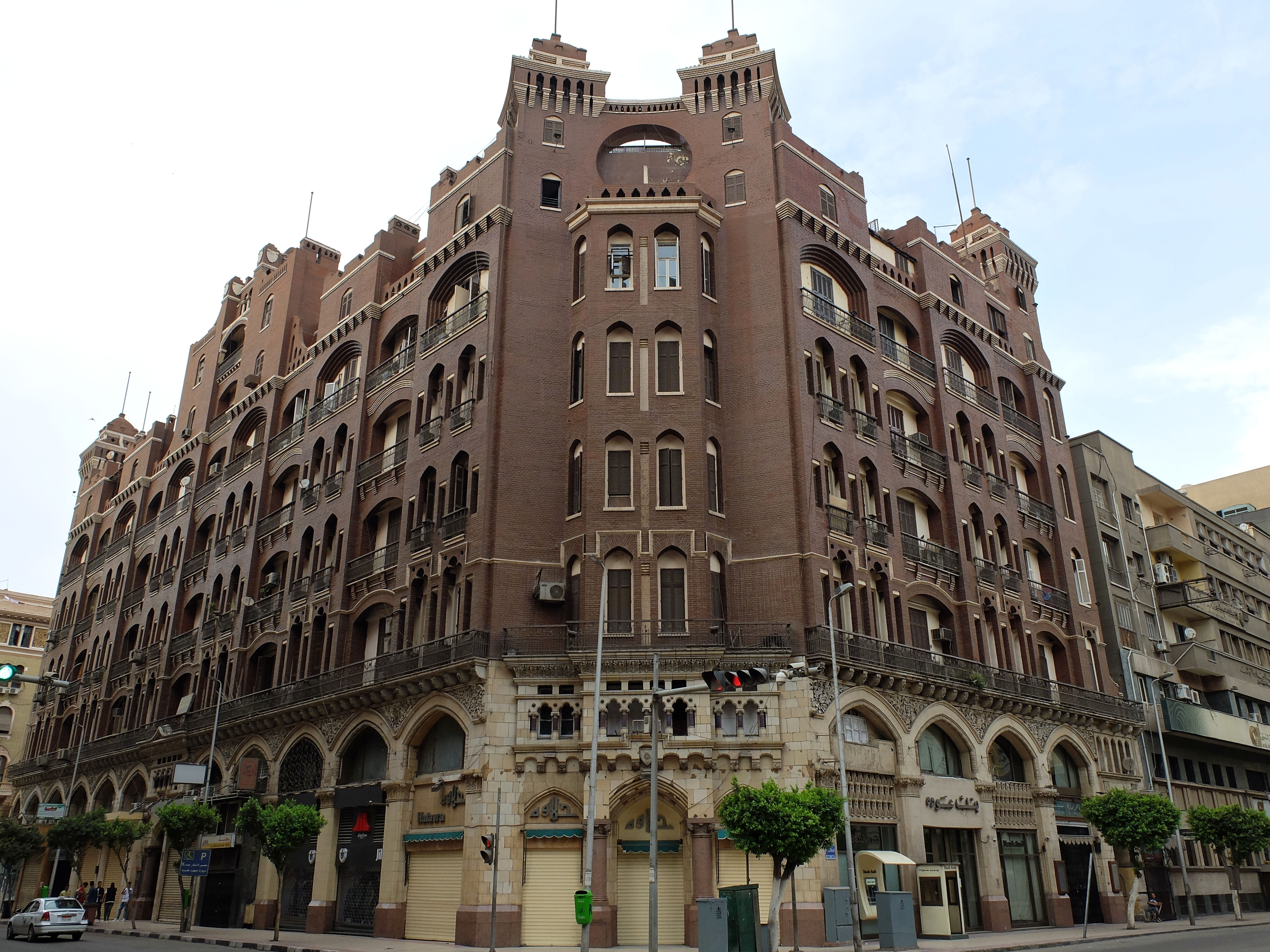
Shurbagi building in Downtown Cairo, built in 1911

Downtown Cairo is the heart of the city and was established during the reign of Isma'il Pasha of Egypt, coinciding with the occasion of the opening of the Suez Canal. Its core layout, with public squares and grand boulevards, was inspired by the ideas of Baron Haussmann, the French administrator who remodelled Paris in the same era. The area includes major landmarks such as Tahrir Square, the adjacent Egyptian Museum, and Talaat Harb Street and its public square, where a statue of economist and entrepreneur Talaat Harb stands. The area also encompasses Abdeen Palace, the former royal residence now used as the official presidential palace, which houses several museums. Its districts feature buildings blending a variety of architectural styles, including Egyptian Islamic architecture, contemporary Beaux-Arts architecture, and other styles of international or European architecture that were fashionable during the late 19th and early 20th centuries. The Qasr El Nil Bridge is also located in the heart of downtown Cairo. The current bridge was completed in 1933 in an Art Deco style, replacing an earlier 19th-century bridge whose four colossal bronze lion statues were preserved and reinstalled on the current bridge. Groppi Ice Cream Shop, located in Talaat Harb Square, was founded in 1909, one of Cairo's oldest ice cream parlours. Café Riche, opened in 1908, has been a meeting place for intellectuals and revolutionaries, witnessing significant events throughout the 20th century.

==== Tahrir Square ====
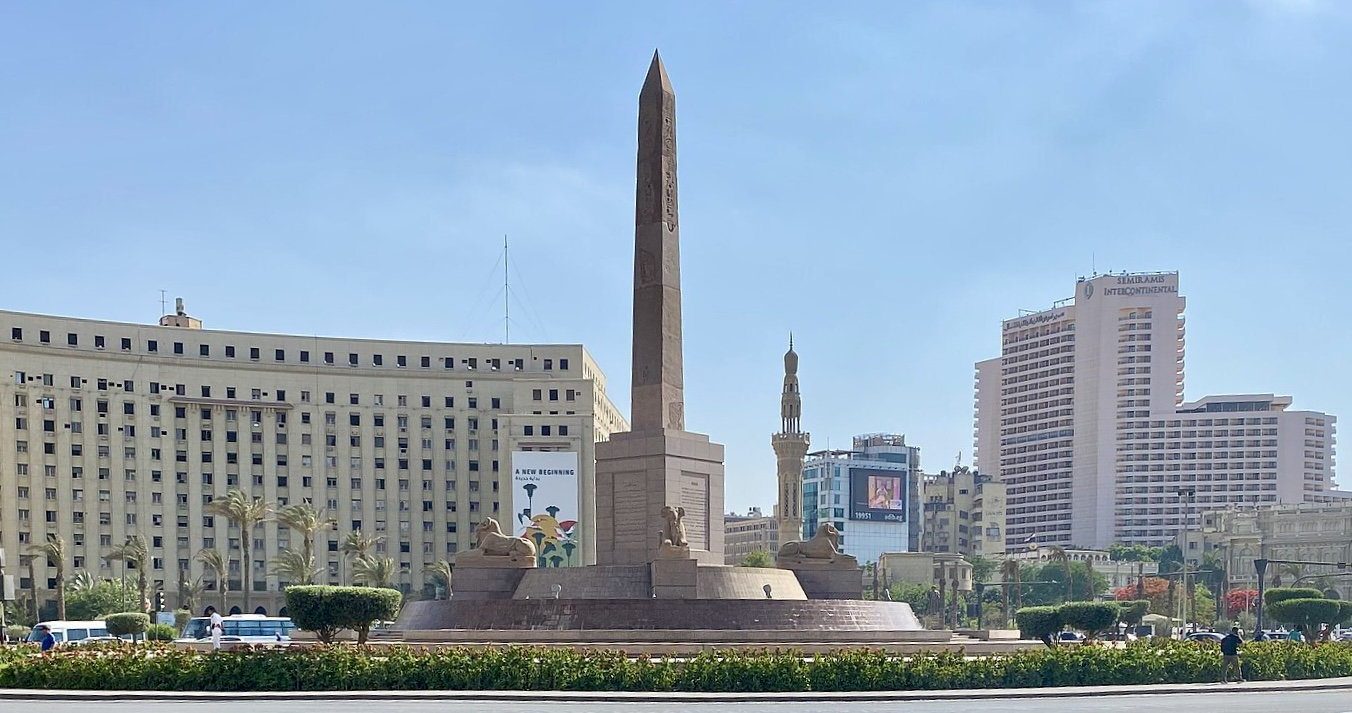
View of Tahrir Square (in 2024)

Tahrir Square was founded during the mid-19th century with the establishment of modern downtown Cairo. It was first named Ismailia Square, after the 19th-century ruler Khedive Ismail, who commissioned the new downtown district's 'Paris on the Nile' design. After the Egyptian Revolution of 1919 the square became widely known as Tahrir (Liberation) Square, though it was not officially renamed as such until after the 1952 Revolution which eliminated the monarchy. Several notable buildings surround the square including, the American University in Cairo's downtown campus, the Mogamma governmental administrative Building, the headquarters of the Arab League, the Nile Ritz Carlton Hotel, and the Egyptian Museum. Being at the heart of Cairo, the square has witnessed several major protests over the years. In 2020, the government completed the erection of a new monument in the centre of the square featuring an ancient obelisk from the reign of Ramses II, originally unearthed at Tanis (San al-Hagar) in 2019, and four ram-headed sphinx statues moved from Karnak.

==== Egyptian Museum ====
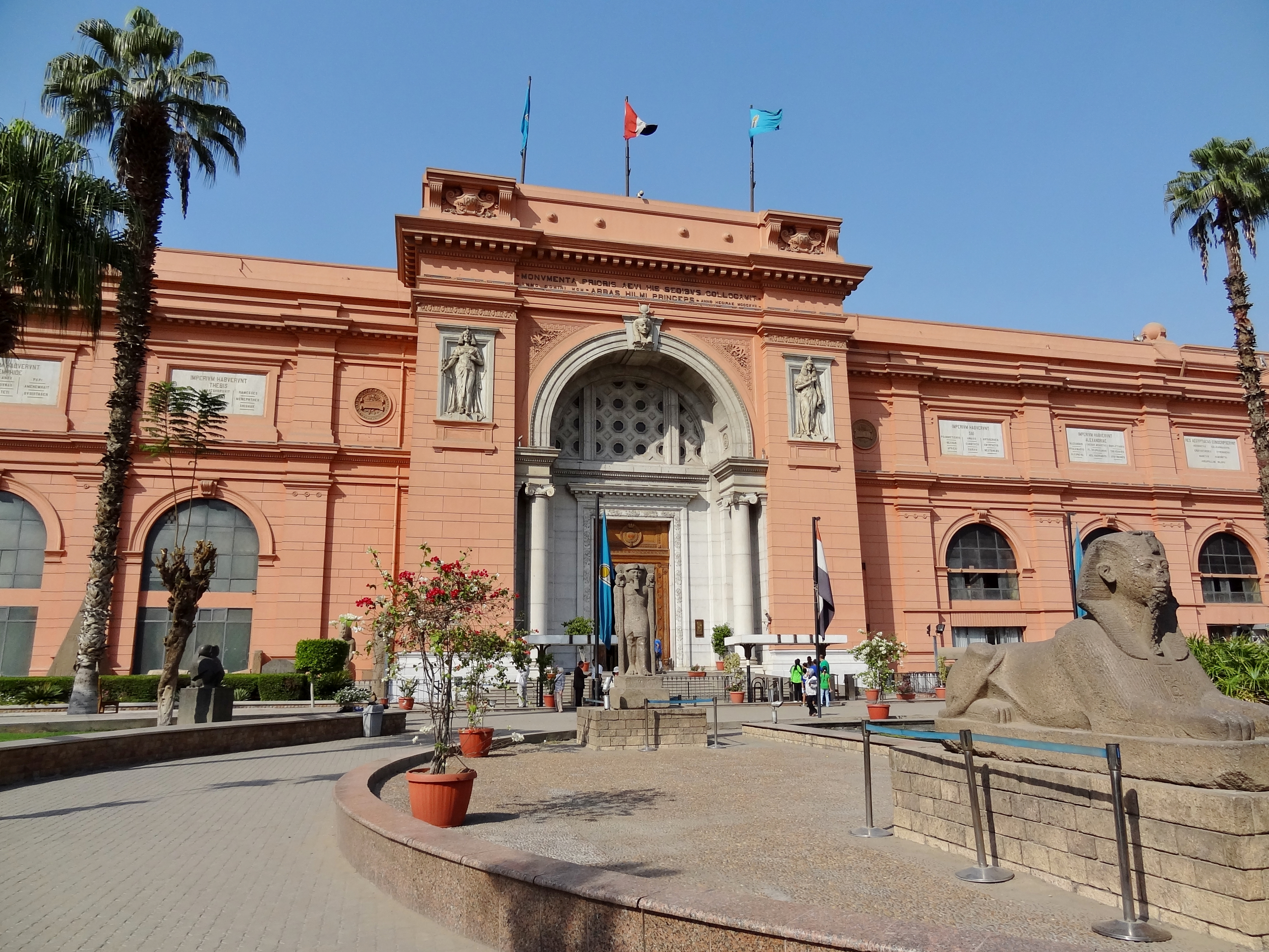
Main entrance of the Egyptian Museum, located at Tahrir Square

The Museum of Egyptian Antiquities, known commonly as the Egyptian Museum, is home to the most extensive collection of ancient Egyptian antiquities in the world. It has 136,000 items on display, with many more hundreds of thousands in its basement storerooms. Among the collections on display are the finds from the tomb of Tutankhamun.

==== National Museum of Egyptian Civilization ====
The National Museum of Egyptian Civilization is a museum located in Fustat, covering an area of 33.5 acres. It houses 50,000 artifacts that tell the story of the development of Egyptian civilization, showcasing the achievements of the Egyptian people in various fields of life from the dawn of history to the present day. The museum also contains models, photographs, manuscripts, oil paintings, works of art, and artifacts from the Stone Age, Ancient Egyptian, Coptic, and modern periods. The museum site overlooks the Ain El Sira natural lake.

==== Cairo Tower ====
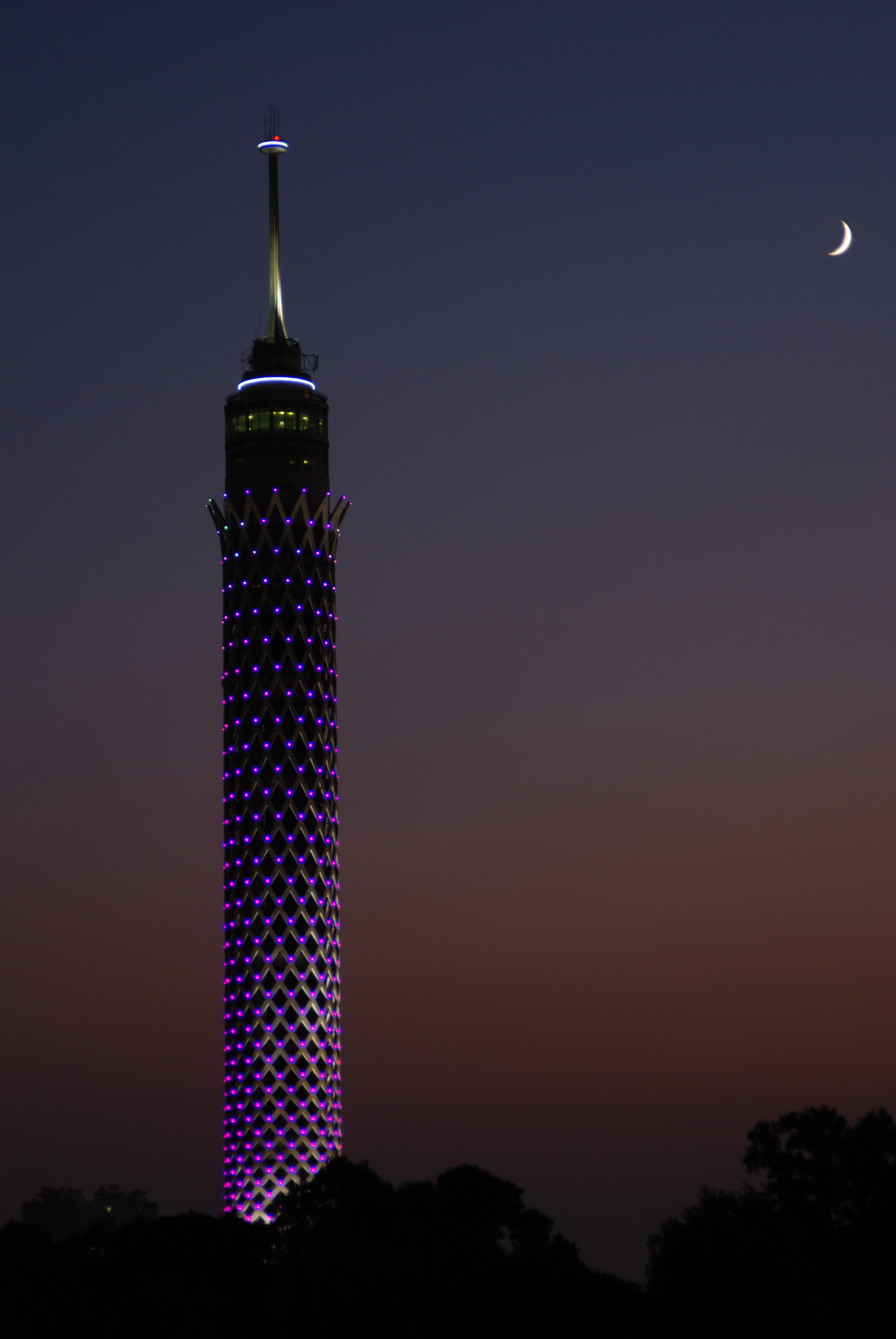
Cairo Tower at night

The Cairo Tower is a free-standing tower with a revolving restaurant at the top. It is one of Cairo's landmarks and provides a bird's eye view of the city to restaurant patrons. It stands in the Zamalek district on Gezira Island on the Nile River, in the city centre. At 187 m (614 ft), it is 44 m (144 ft) higher than the Great Pyramid of Giza, which stands some 15 km (9 mi) to the southwest.

=== Old Cairo ===
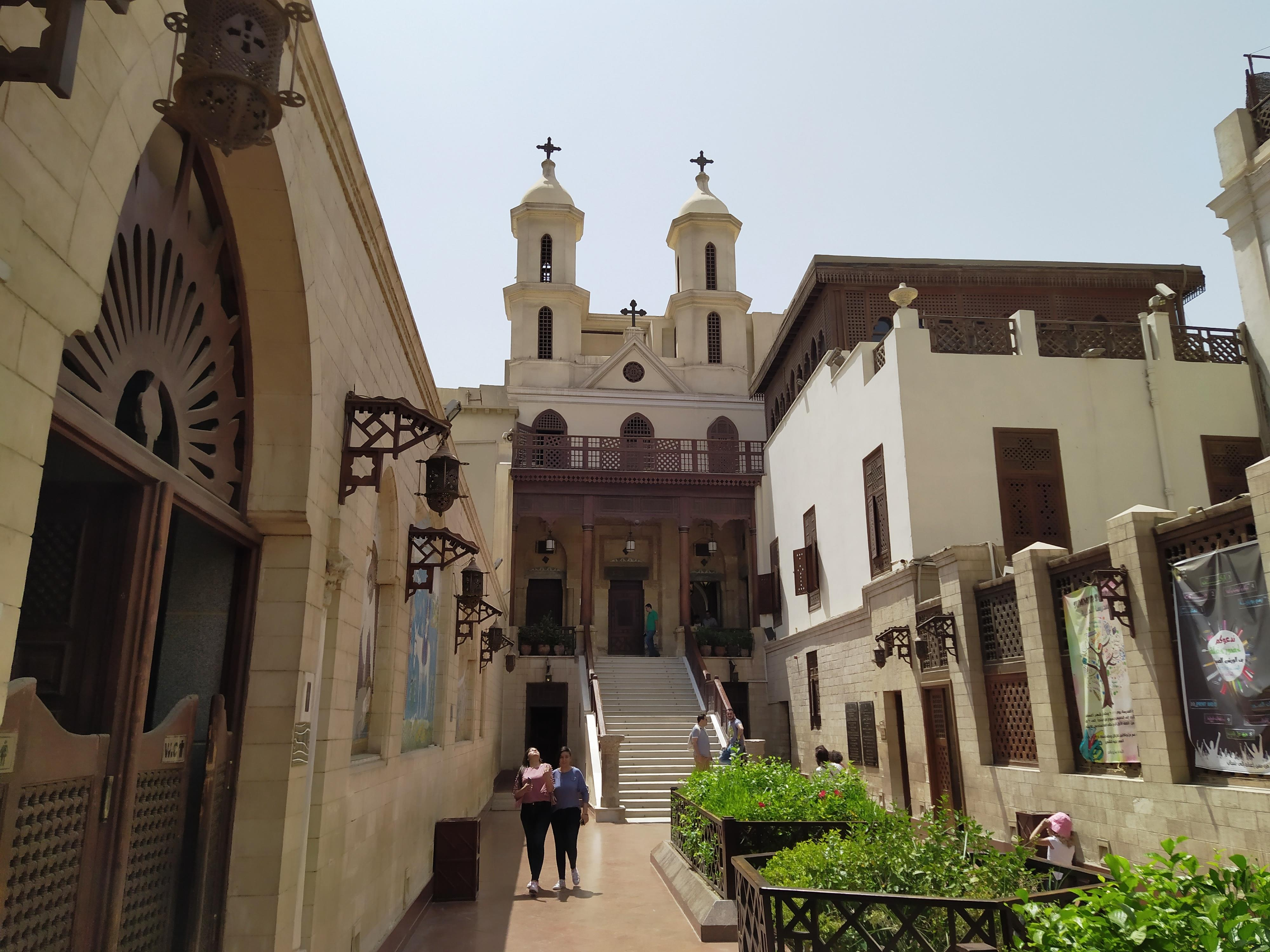
The Hanging Church in Old Cairo

This area of Cairo is so-named as it contains the remains of the ancient Roman fortress of Babylon and also overlaps the original site of Fustat, the first Arab settlement in Egypt (7th century AD) and the predecessor of later Cairo. The area includes Coptic Cairo, which holds a high concentration of old Christian churches such as the Hanging Church, the Greek Orthodox Church of St. George, and other Christian or Coptic buildings, most of which are located in an enclave on the site of the ancient Roman fortress. It is also the location of the Coptic Museum, which showcases the history of Coptic art from Greco-Roman to Islamic times, and of the Ben Ezra Synagogue, the oldest and best-known synagogue in Cairo, where the important collection of Geniza documents were discovered in the 19th century.

To the north of this Coptic enclave is the Amr ibn al-'As Mosque, the first mosque in Egypt and the most important religious centre of what was formerly Fustat, founded in 642 AD right after the Arab conquest but rebuilt many times since. A part of the former city of Fustat has also been excavated to the east of the mosque and of the Coptic enclave, although the archeological site is threatened by encroaching construction and modern development. To the northwest of Babylon Fortress and the mosque is the Monastery of Saint Mercurius (or Dayr Abu Sayfayn), an important and historic Coptic religious complex consisting of the Church of Saint Mercurius, the Church of Saint Shenute, and the Church of the Virgin (also known as al-Damshiriya). Several other historic churches are also situated to the south of Babylon Fortress.

=== Islamic Cairo ===
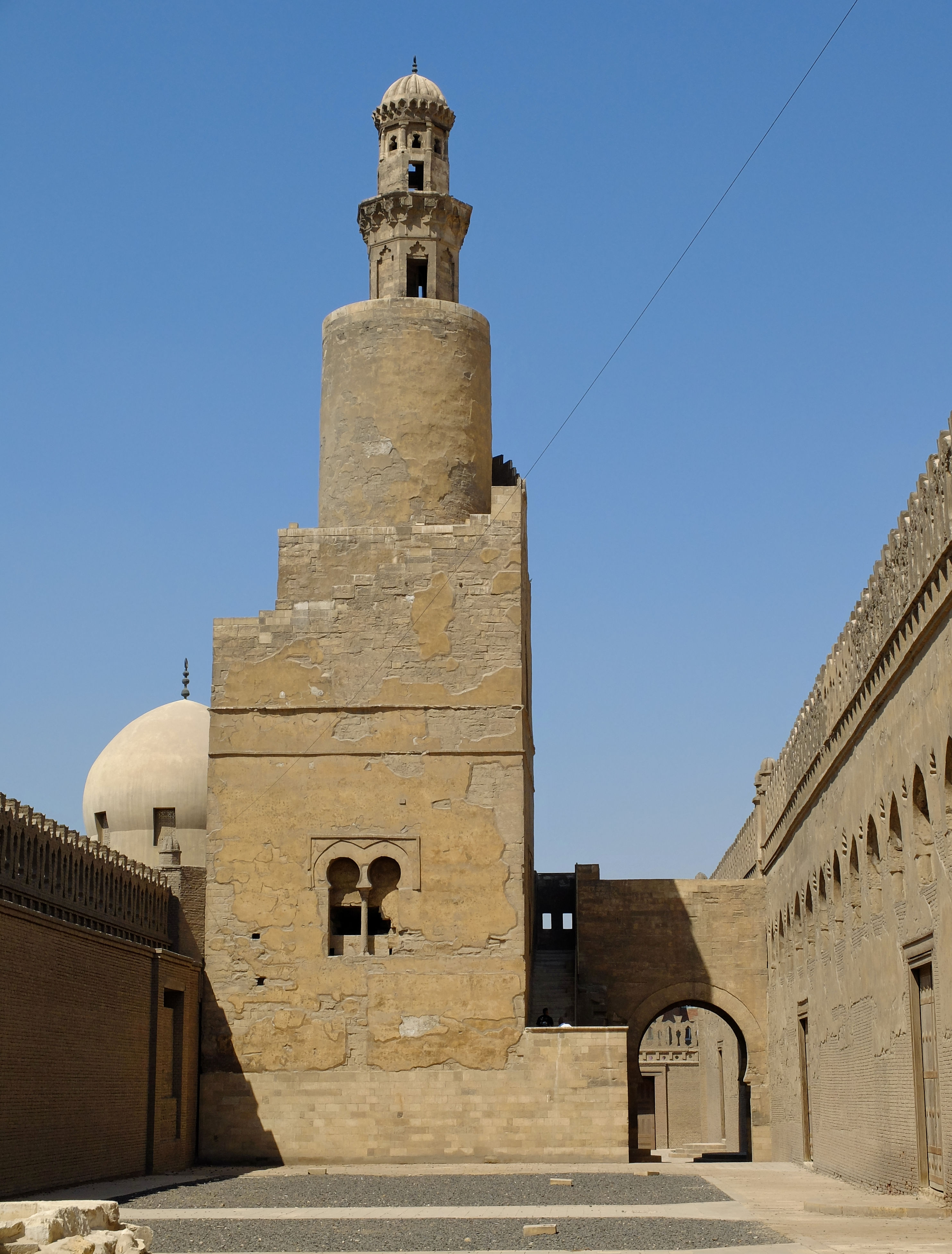
Mosque of Ibn Tulun, view of the Tulunid-era minaret

Cairo holds one of the greatest concentrations of historical monuments of Islamic architecture in the world. The areas around the old walled city and around the Citadel are characterised by hundreds of mosques, tombs, madrasas, mansions, caravanserais, and fortifications dating from the Islamic era and are often referred to as "Islamic Cairo", especially in English travel literature. It is also the location of several important religious shrines such as the al-Hussein Mosque (whose shrine is believed to hold the head of Husayn ibn Ali), the Mausoleum of Imam al-Shafi'i (founder of the Shafi'i madhhab, one of the primary schools of thought in Sunni Islamic jurisprudence), the Tomb of Sayyida Ruqayya, the Mosque of Sayyida Nafisa, and others.

The first mosque in Egypt was the Mosque of Amr ibn al-As in what was formerly Fustat, the first Arab-Muslim settlement in the area. However, the Mosque of Ibn Tulun is the oldest mosque that still retains its original form and is a rare example of Abbasid architecture from the classical period of Islamic civilisation. It was built in 876–879 AD in a style inspired by the Abbasid capital of Samarra in Iraq. It is one of the largest mosques in Cairo and is often cited as one of the most beautiful. Another Abbasid construction, the Nilometer on Roda Island, is the oldest original structure in Cairo, built in 862 AD. It was designed to measure the level of the Nile, which was important for agricultural and administrative purposes.

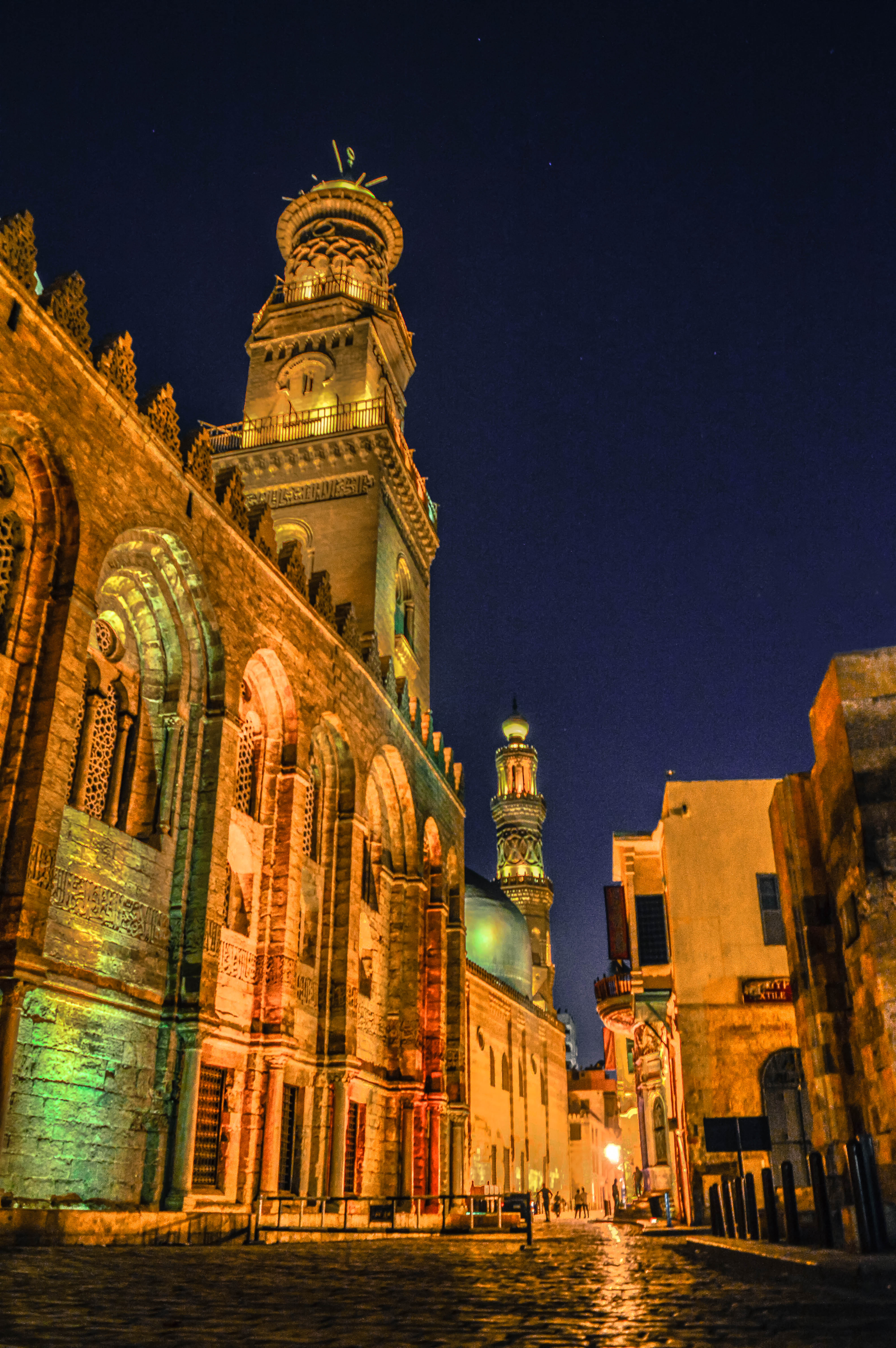
Al-Muizz Street in Islamic Cairo

The settlement that was formally named Cairo (Arabic: al-Qahira) was founded to the northeast of Fustat in 959 AD by the victorious Fatimid army. The Fatimids built it as a separate palatial city which contained their palaces and institutions of government. It was enclosed by a circuit of walls, which were rebuilt in stone in the late 11th century AD by the vizier Badr al-Gamali, parts of which survive today at Bab Zuwayla in the south and Bab al-Futuh and Bab al-Nasr in the north. Among the extant monuments from the Fatimid era are the large Mosque of al-Hakim, the Aqmar Mosque, Juyushi Mosque, Lulua Mosque, and the Mosque of Al-Salih Tala'i.

One of the most important and lasting institutions founded in the Fatimid period was the Mosque of al-Azhar, founded in 970 AD, which competes with the al-Qarawiyyin in Fes for the title of oldest university in the world. Today, al-Azhar University is the foremost Center of Islamic learning in the world and one of Egypt's largest universities with campuses across the country. The mosque itself retains significant Fatimid elements but has been added to and expanded in subsequent centuries, notably by the Mamluk sultans Qaytbay and al-Ghuri and by Abd al-Rahman Katkhuda in the 18th century.

Mosque-Madrasa of Sultan Hasan and the al-Rifa'i Mosque, seen from the Cairo Citadel

The most prominent architectural heritage of medieval Cairo, however, dates from the Mamluk period, from 1250 to 1517 AD. The Mamluk sultans and elites were eager patrons of religious and scholarly life, commonly building religious or funerary complexes whose functions could include a mosque, madrasa, khanqah (for Sufis), a sabil (water dispensary), and a mausoleum for themselves and their families. Among the best-known examples of Mamluk monuments in Cairo are the huge Mosque-Madrasa of Sultan Hasan, the Mosque of Amir al-Maridani, the Mosque of Sultan al-Mu'ayyad (whose twin minarets were built above the gate of Bab Zuwayla), the Sultan Al-Ghuri complex, the funerary complex of Sultan Qaytbay in the Northern Cemetery, and the trio of monuments in the Bayn al-Qasrayn area comprising the complex of Sultan al-Mansur Qalawun, the Madrasa of al-Nasir Muhammad, and the Madrasa of Sultan Barquq. Some mosques include spolia (often columns or capitals) from earlier buildings built by the Romans, Byzantines, or Copts.

The Mamluks, and the later Ottomans, also built wikalas or caravanserais to house merchants and goods due to the important role of trade and commerce in Cairo's economy. Still intact today is the Wikala al-Ghuri, which today hosts regular performances by the Al-Tannoura Egyptian Heritage Dance Troupe. The Khan al-Khalili is a commercial hub which also integrated caravanserais (also known as khans).

==== Citadel of Cairo ====
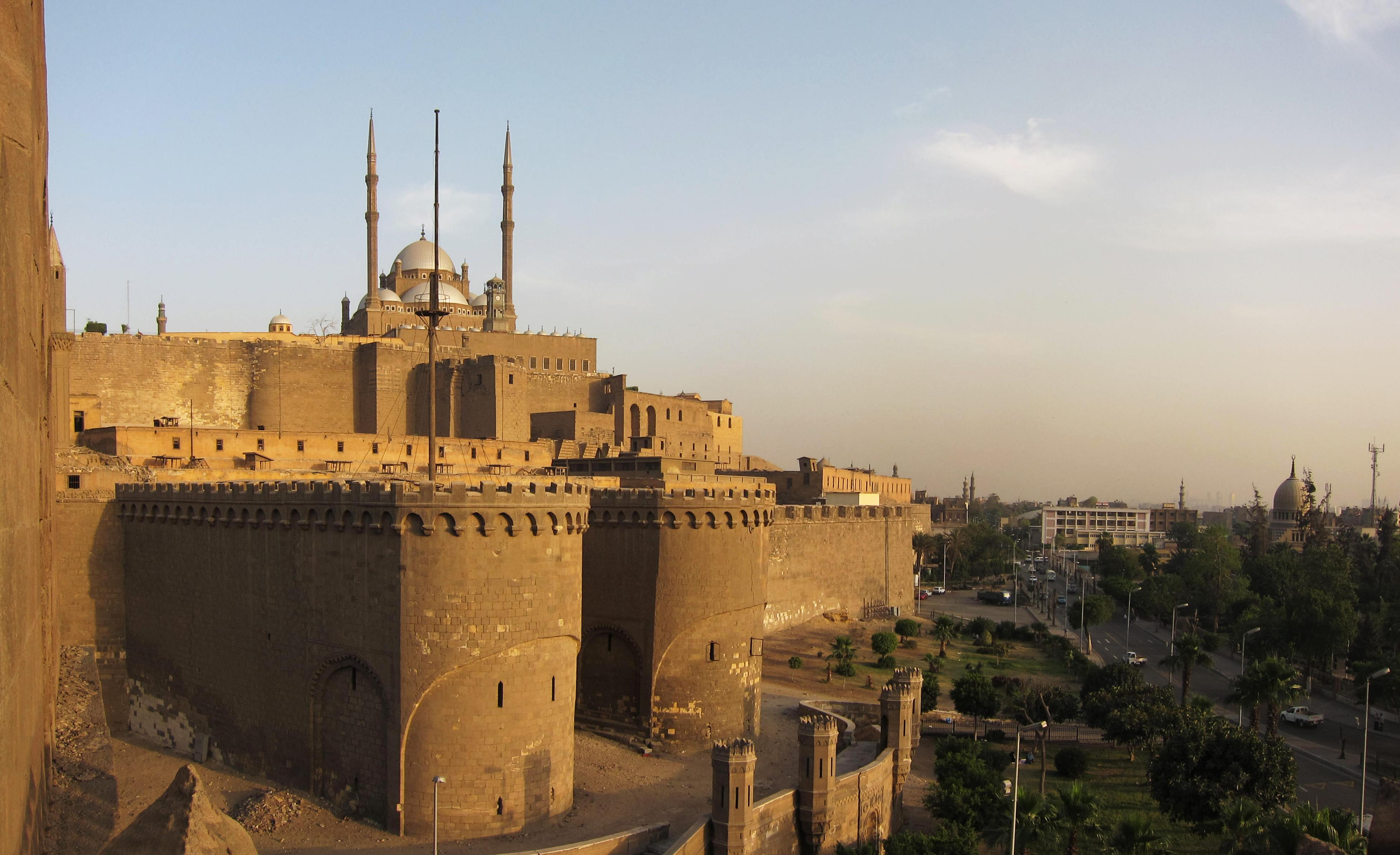
The Citadel of Cairo, with the Mosque of Muhammad Ali

The Citadel is a fortified enclosure begun by Salah al-Din in 1176 AD on an outcrop of the Muqattam Hills as part of a large defensive system to protect both Cairo to the north and Fustat to the southwest. It was the centre of Egyptian government and residence of its rulers until 1874, when Khedive Isma'il moved to 'Abdin Palace. It is still occupied by the military today, but is now open as a tourist attraction comprising, notably, the National Military Museum, the 14th century Mosque of al-Nasir Muhammad, and the 19th century Mosque of Muhammad Ali which commands a dominant position on Cairo's skyline.

==== Khan el-Khalili ====
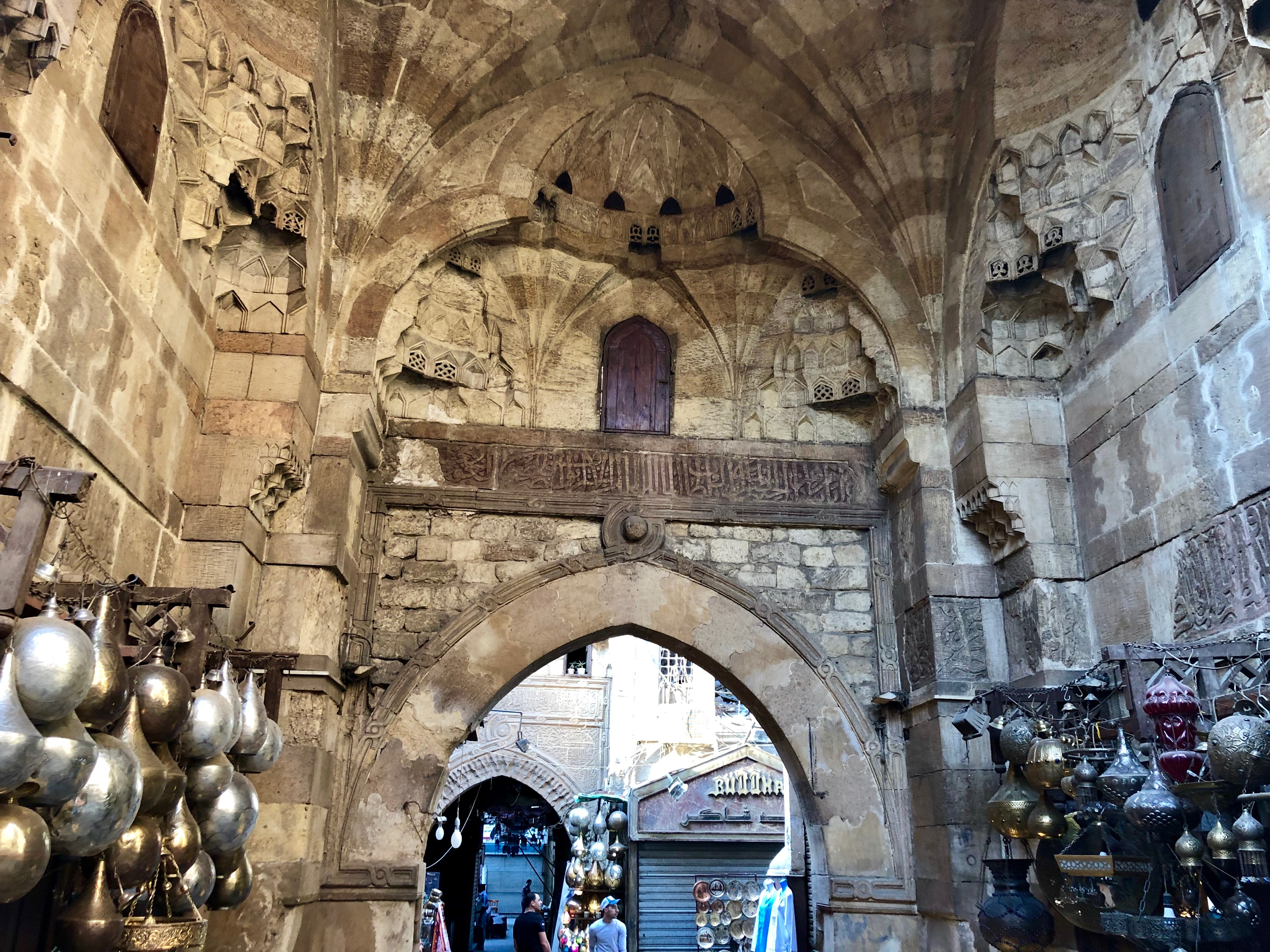
A medieval gateway in Khan al-Khalili

Khan el-Khalili is an ancient bazaar, or marketplace adjacent to the Al-Hussein Mosque. It dates back to 1385, when Amir Jarkas el-Khalili built a large caravanserai, or khan. (A caravanserai is a hotel for traders, and usually the focal point for any surrounding area.) This original caravanserai building was demolished by Sultan al-Ghuri, who rebuilt it as a new commercial complex in the early 16th century, forming the basis for the network of souqs existing today. Many medieval elements remain today, including the ornate Mamluk-style gateways. Today, Khan el-Khalili is a major tourist attraction and popular stop for tour groups.

==== Al-Azhar Park ====
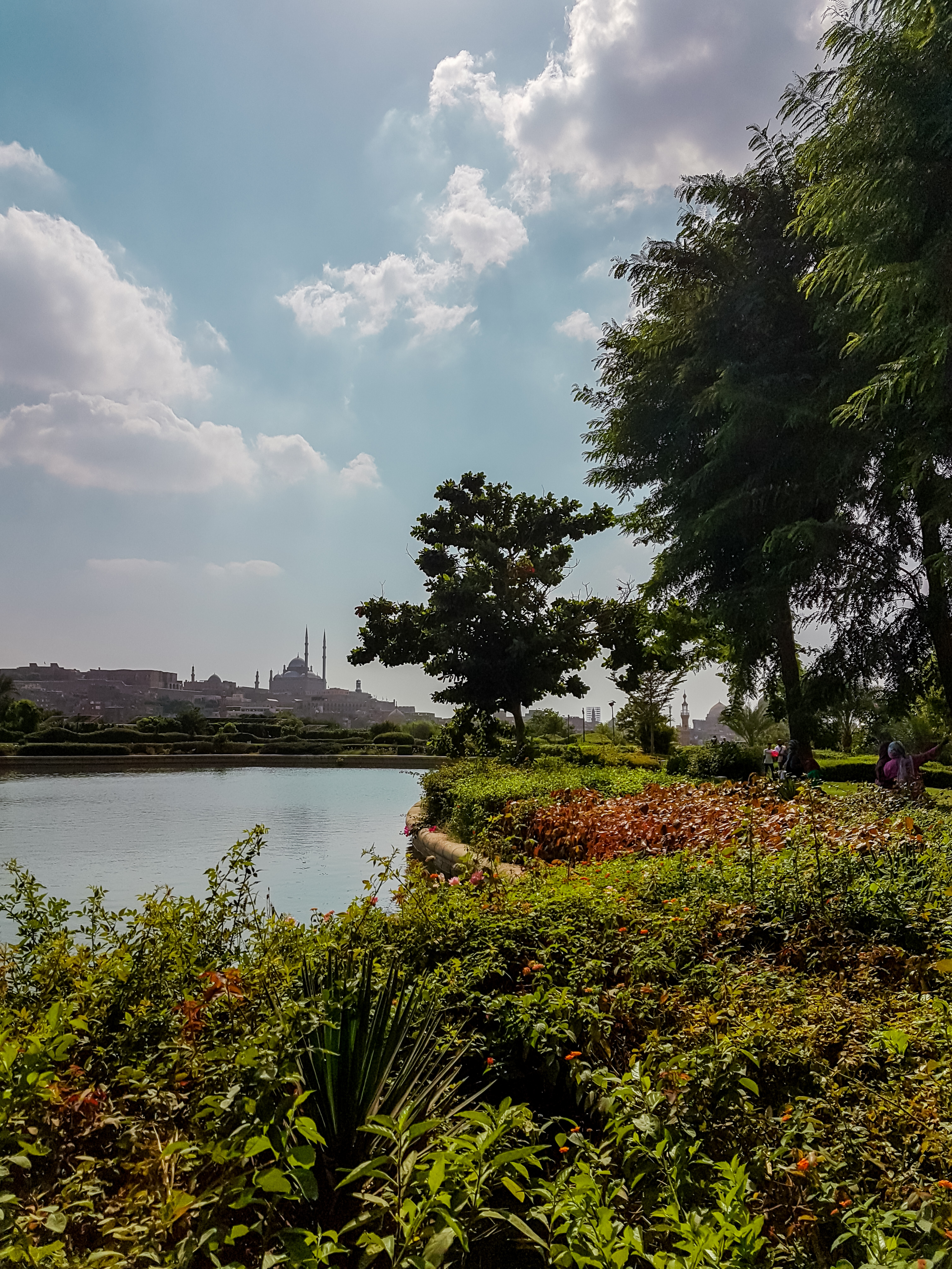
View of the Cairo Citadel, seen from the Al-Azhar Park

Al-Azhar Park is a park that sits right on the edge of Islamic Cairo in the Al-Darb al-Ahmar district. It covers an area of around 80 feddans, a site that had previously served as a dumping ground for debris for hundreds of years. The park was officially opened to visitors in 2005. It is listed as one of the world's sixty great public spaces by the Project for Public Spaces. Al-Azhar Park project involves an urban initiative encompassed the archaeological work involving a 12th-century Ayyubid wall, the rehabilitation of historic buildings, such as the 13th-century Amir Khayrbak Funerary Complex. The park also provides various training, area rehabilitation, support in health and education, among other areas.

== Society ==
In the present day, Cairo is a heavily urbanised city. Because of the influx of people into the city, lone standing houses are rare, and apartment buildings accommodate for the limited space and abundance of people. Single detached houses are usually owned by the wealthy. Formal education is also seen as important, with twelve years of standard formal education. Cairenes can take a standardised test similar to the SAT to be accepted to an institution of higher learning, but most children do not finish school and opt to pick up a trade to enter the workforce. Egypt still struggles with poverty, with almost half the population living on $2 or less a day.

=== Women's rights ===
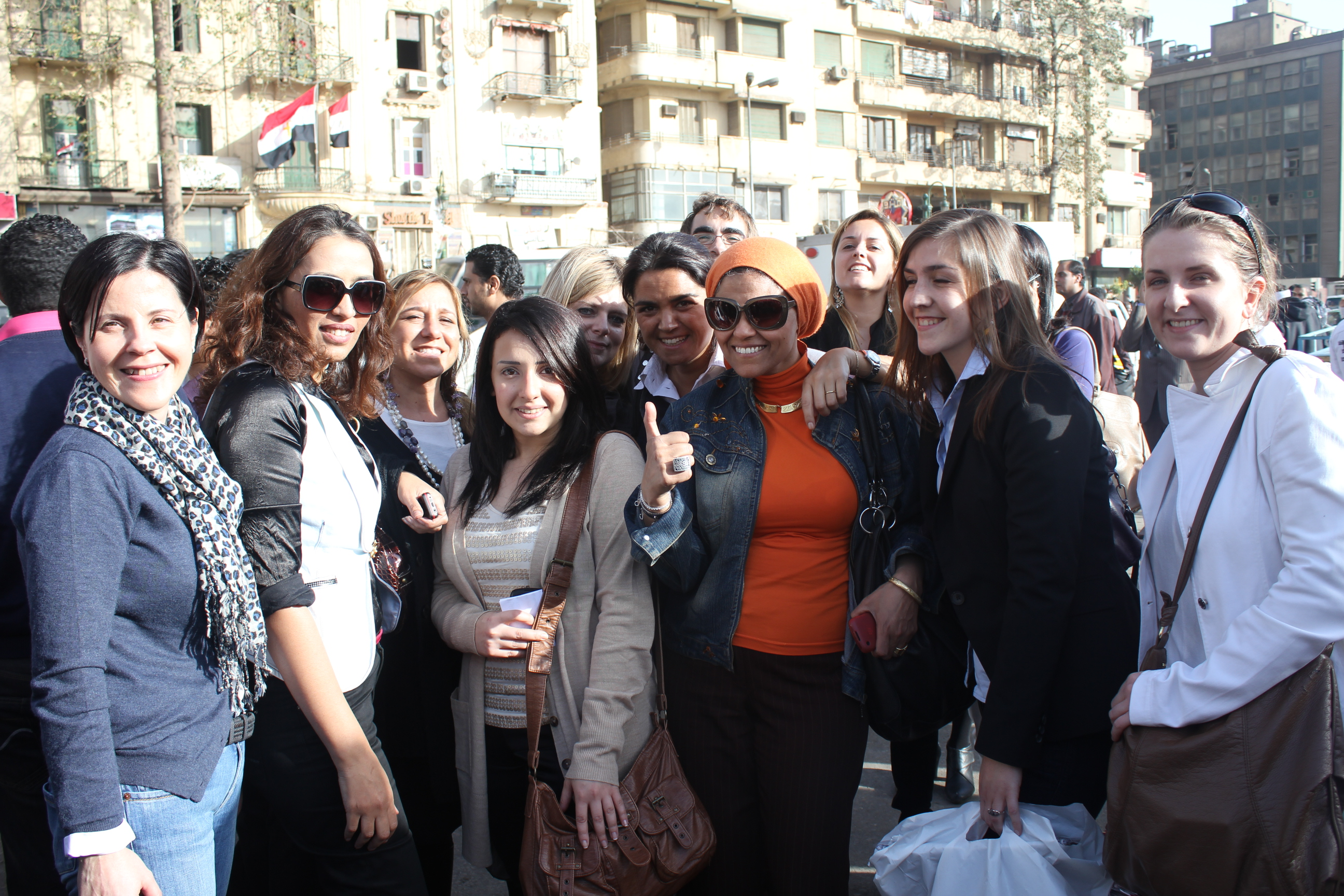
International Women's Day, Cairo in 2011

The civil rights movement for women in Cairo – and by extent, Egypt – has been a struggle for years. Women are reported to face constant discrimination, sexual harassment, and abuse throughout Cairo. A 2013 UN study found that over 99% of Egyptian women reported experiencing sexual harassment at some point in their lives. The problem has persisted in spite of new national laws since 2014 defining and criminalising sexual harassment. The situation is so severe that in 2017, Cairo was named by one poll as the most dangerous megacity for women in the world. In 2020, the social media account "Assault Police" began to name and shame perpetrators of violence against women, in an effort to dissuade potential offenders. The account was founded by student Nadeen Ashraf, who is credited for instigating an iteration of the #MeToo movement in Egypt.

== Challenges ==
=== Traffic ===
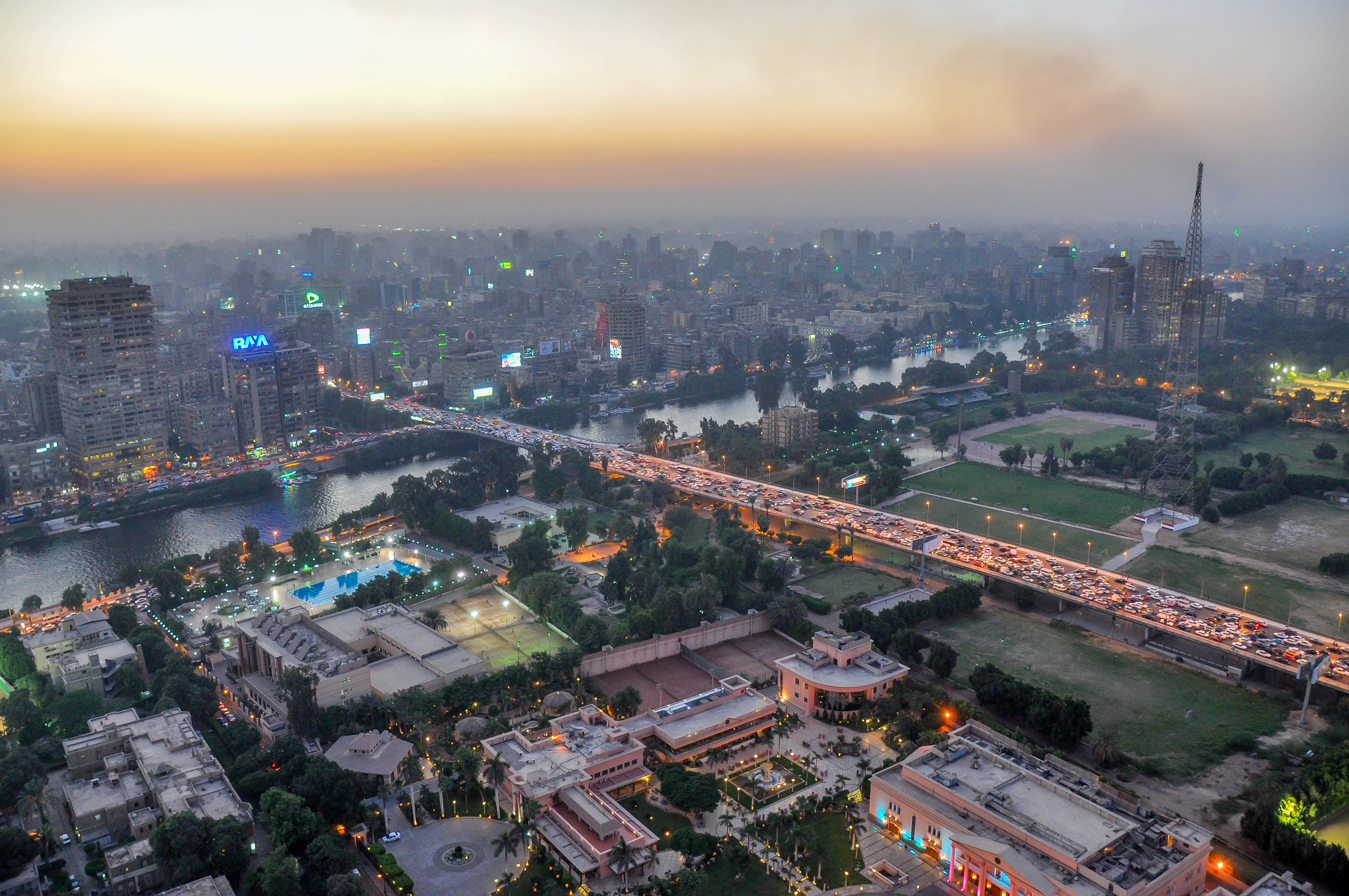
Traffic on the 6th October Bridge in Cairo

Traffic in Cairo is known for being congested. As of 2026, the city remains a global outlier for high-density vehicle traffic on limited road space. Most of Cairo operates in a near-permanent rush-hour state. Major corridors often see average speeds drop to 15–40 km/h, which is roughly half of their design speed. While traffic is heavy throughout the day, the primary peak hours are between 8:00 AM – 9:00 AM and 6:00 PM – 7:00 PM. One of the most critical arterial routes, frequently prone to severe bottlenecks.

A major road running along the river that serves as one of the city's busiest and most vital thoroughfares. Areas around Tahrir Square, Ramsses, and Ataba are congested due to dense pedestrian activity. The Cairo Metro is a faster alternative to bypass street-level traffic, though it is often extremely crowded. The persistent congestion is estimated to cost Egypt approximately 4% of its annual GDP due to wasted time, excessive fuel consumption, and vehicle wear-and-tear.

=== Pollution ===
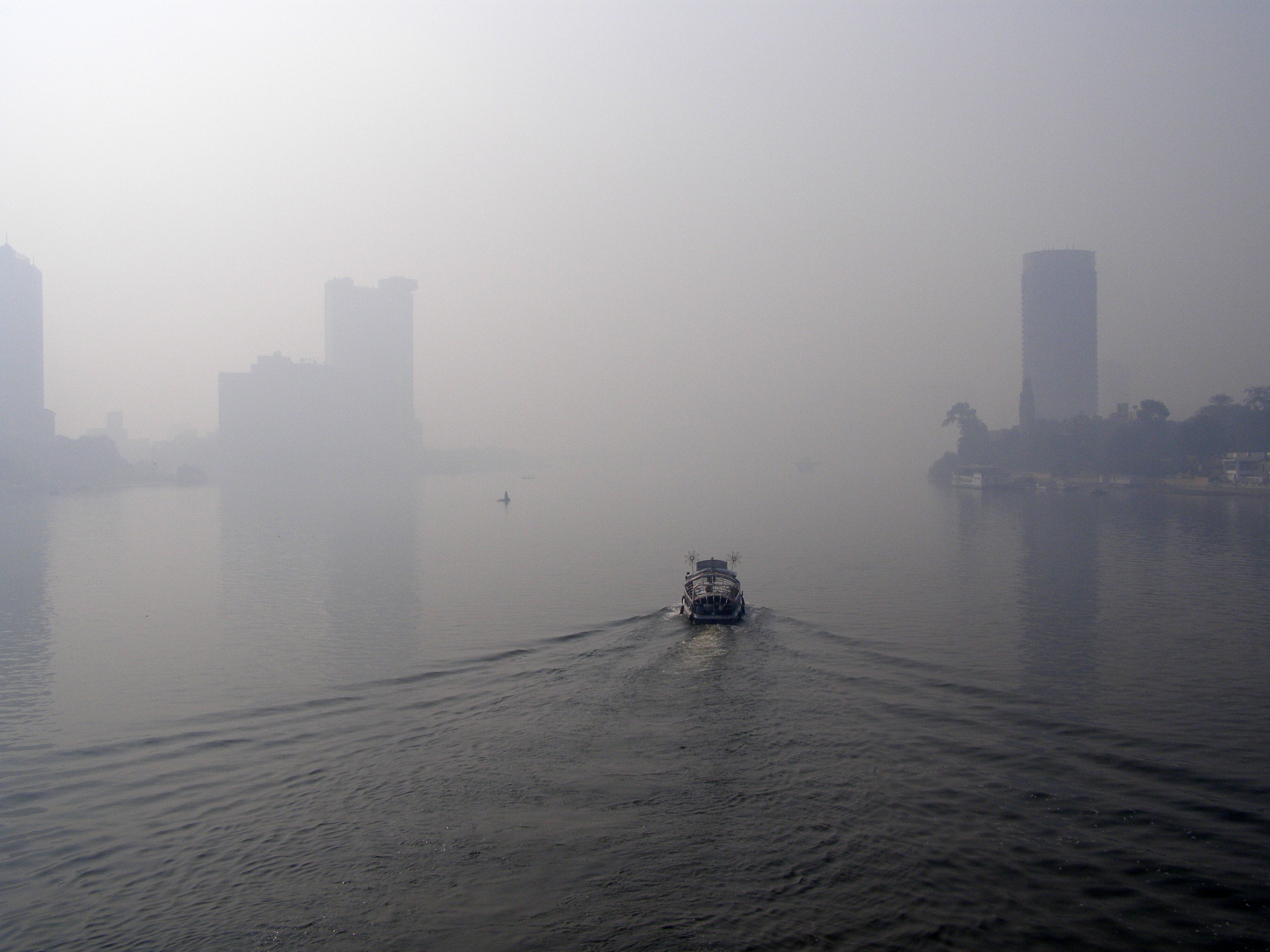
Smog in Cairo

The air pollution in Cairo is a matter of serious concern. Greater Cairo's volatile aromatic hydrocarbon levels are higher than many other similar cities. Air quality measurements in Cairo have also been recording dangerous levels of lead, carbon dioxide, sulphur dioxide, and suspended particulate matter concentrations due to decades of unregulated vehicle emissions, urban industrial operations, and chaff and trash burning. There are over 4,500,000 cars on the streets of Cairo, 60% of which are over 10 years old, and therefore lack modern emission cutting features. Cairo has a very poor dispersion factor because of its lack of rain and its layout of tall buildings and narrow streets, which create a bowl effect.

In recent years, a black cloud (as Egyptians refer to it) of smog has appeared over Cairo every autumn due to temperature inversion. Smog causes serious respiratory diseases and eye irritations for the city's citizens. Tourists who are not familiar with such high levels of pollution must take extra care.

Cairo also has many unregistered lead and copper smelters which heavily pollute the city. The results of this has been a permanent haze over the city with particulate matter in the air reaching over three times normal levels. It is estimated that 10,000 to 25,000 people a year in Cairo die due to air pollution-related diseases. Lead has been shown to cause harm to the central nervous system and neurotoxicity particularly in children. In 1995, the first environmental acts were introduced and the situation has seen some improvement with 36 air monitoring stations and emissions tests on cars. Twenty thousand buses have also been commissioned to the city to improve congestion levels, which are very high.

The city also suffers from a high level of land pollution. Cairo produces 10,000 tons of waste material each day, 4,000 tons of which are not collected or managed. This is a huge health hazard, and the Egyptian Government is looking for ways to combat this. The Cairo Cleaning and Beautification Agency was founded to collect and recycle the waste; they work with the Zabbaleen community that has been collecting and recycling Cairo's waste since the turn of the 20th century and live in an area known locally as Manshiyat Naser. Both are working together to pick up as much waste as possible within the city limits, though it remains a pressing problem.

== International relations ==
The Headquarters of the Arab League is located at Tahrir Square in downtown Cairo.

=== Twin towns – sister cities ===
Cairo is twinned with:

- Abu Dhabi, United Arab Emirates
- Amman, Jordan
- Baghdad, Iraq
- Beijing, China
- Damascus, Syria
- East Jerusalem, Palestine
- Istanbul, Turkey
- Kairouan, Tunisia
- Khartoum, Sudan
- Muscat, Oman
- Palermo Province, Italy
- Rabat, Morocco
- Sanaa, Yemen
- Seoul, South Korea
- Stuttgart, Germany
- Tashkent, Uzbekistan
- Tbilisi, Georgia
- Tokyo, Japan
- Tripoli, Libya

== Notable people ==
- Abu Sa'id al-Afif, 15th-century Samaritan
- Rabab Al-Kadhimi (1918–1998), dentist and poet
- Wael Alaa (born 1987), musician known as Neobyrd
- Amr Aly (born 1962), American soccer player and Olympian
- Yasser Arafat (1929–2004), born Mohammed Abdel Rahman Abdel Raouf al-Qudwa al-Husseini, was the 3rd Chairman of The PLO and first president of the Palestinian Authority
- Gamal Aziz, also known as Gamal Mohammed Abdelaziz, former president and chief operating officer of Wynn Resorts, and former CEO of MGM Resorts International, indicted as part of the 2019 college admissions bribery scandal
- Ingie Chalhoub, French-Lebanese business executive and fashion designer, President of Etoile Group, Artistic Director of INGIE Paris
- Avi Cohen (1956–2010), Israeli international footballer
- Dalida (1933–1987), Italian-Egyptian singer who lived most of her life in France, received 55 golden records and was the first singer to receive a diamond disc
- Farouk El-Baz (born 1938), Egyptian American space scientist who worked with NASA to assist in the planning of scientific exploration of the Moon, including the selection of landing sites for the Apollo missions and the training of astronauts in lunar observations and photography
- Freddy Elbaiady (born 1971), Egyptian politician
- Mohamed ElBaradei (born 1942), former Director General of the International Atomic Energy Agency, 2005 Nobel Peace Prize laureate
- Amani Farid (1922-2005), journalist, feminist, poet, and political activist
- C. S. Forester (1899–1966), English novelist known for writing tales of naval warfare, born in Cairo
- Nourane Foster (born 1987), Cameroonian entrepreneur, politician and member of the National Assembly
- Boutros Ghali (1922–2016), former Secretary-General of the United Nations
- William Donald Hamilton (1936–2000), British evolutionary biologist, was born in Cairo
- Mauro Hamza (born 1965/1966), fencing coach
- Ahmed Hassanein, NFL player for the Detroit Lions, spent most of his childhood in Cairo
- Taco Hemingway (born 1990), Polish hip-hop artist
- Dorothy Hodgkin (1910–1994), British chemist, credited with the development of protein crystallography, Nobel Prize in Chemistry in 1964
- Sonallah Ibrahim (1937–2025), novelist and short story writer
- Yakub Kadri Karaosmanoğlu (1889–1974), Turkish novelist
- Sarah Khalifa (born 1994), entrepreneur, businesswoman and convicted criminal
- Naguib Mahfouz (1911–2006), novelist, Nobel Prize in Literature laureate in 1988
- Emanuel Margoliash (1920–2008), biochemist
- Roland Moreno (1945–2012), French inventor, engineer, humorist and author who invented the smart card
- Ismail Pacha (1830–1895), Egyptian politician who served as Khedive of Egypt from 1863 to 1879
- Maghlatay ibn Qalij (1291–1361), Islamic scholar and author of the Mamluk era
- Ahmed Sabri (1889–1955), painter
- Byron C. Sakiadis, chemical engineer
- Naguib Sawiris (born 1954), businessman, 62nd richest person on Earth in 2007 list of billionaires, reaching US$10.0 billion with his company Orascom Telecom Holding
- Mohamed Sobhi (born 1948), film, television and stage actor, and director
- Blessed Maria Caterina Troiani (1813–1887), charitable activist
- Magdi Yacoub (born 1935), Egyptian-British cardiothoracic surgeon
- Hesham Youssef, Egyptian diplomat
- Ezz El-Dine Zulficar (1919–1963), Egyptian film director, screenwriter, actor and producer, known for his distinctive style, which blends romance and action; one of the most influential filmmakers in Egyptian cinema's golden age
- Mona Zulficar (born 1950), lawyer and human rights activist; included in the Forbes 2021 list of the "100 most powerful businesswomen in the Arab region"
- Ahmed Mourad Bey Zulfikar (1888–1945), Egyptian chief of police
- Ahmed Zulfikar (1952–2010), mechanical engineer and entrepreneur
- Dina Zulfikar (born 1962), film distributor and animal welfare activist

== See also ==
- Charles Ayrout
- Cultural tourism in Egypt
- List of buildings in Cairo
- List of cities and towns in Egypt
- Outline of Cairo
- Outline of Egypt
- Architecture of Egypt
