= ISO 3166-2:EG =

Entry for Egypt in ISO 3166-2

ISO 3166-2:EG is the entry for Egypt in ISO 3166-2, part of the ISO 3166 standard published by the International Organization for Standardization (ISO), which defines codes for the names of the principal subdivisions (e.g., provinces or states) of all countries coded in ISO 3166-1.

Currently for Egypt, ISO 3166-2 codes are defined for 27 governorates. 6th of October Governorate and Helwan Governorate, which had their codes added in Newsletter II-2, were merged back into Giza Governorate and Cairo Governorate respectively in 2011.

Each code consists of two parts, separated by a hyphen. The first part is EG, the ISO 3166-1 alpha-2 code of Egypt. The second part is either one, two, or three letters.

== Current codes ==
Subdivision names are listed as in the ISO 3166-2 standard published by the ISO 3166 Maintenance Agency (ISO 3166/MA).

Click on the button in the header to sort each column.

Code	Subdivision name (ar) (BGN/PCGN 1956)	Local variant	Subdivision name (ar) (Note: For reference only, Arabic name in Arabic script not included in the ISO 3166-2 standard.)	Subdivision name (en) (Note: For reference only, English name not included in the ISO 3166-2 standard.)
EG-DK	Ad Daqahlīyah		الدقهلية	Dakahlia
EG-BA	Al Baḩr al Aḩmar	Red Sea	البحر الأحمر	Red Sea
EG-BH	Al Buḩayrah		البحيرة	Beheira
EG-FYM	Al Fayyūm		الفيوم	Faiyum
EG-GH	Al Gharbīyah		الغربية	Gharbia
EG-ALX	Al Iskandarīyah	Alexandria	الإسكندرية	Alexandria
EG-IS	Al Ismā'īlīyah		الإسماعيلية	Ismailia
EG-GZ	Al Jīzah	Giza	الجيزة	Giza
EG-MNF	Al Minūfīyah		المنُوفيّة	Monufia
EG-MN	Al Minyā		المنيا	Minya
EG-C	Al Qāhirah	Cairo	القاهرة	Cairo
EG-KB	Al Qalyūbīyah		القليوبية	Qalyubia
EG-LX	Al Uqşur	Luxor	الأقصر	Luxor
EG-WAD	Al Wādī al Jadīd	New Valley	الوادي الجديد	New Valley
EG-SUZ	As Suways	Suez	السويس	Suez
EG-SHR	Ash Sharqīyah		الشرقية	Al Sharqia
EG-ASN	Aswān		أسوان	Aswan
EG-AST	Asyūţ		أسيوط	Asyut
EG-BNS	Banī Suwayf		بني سويف	Beni Suef
EG-PTS	Būr Sa‘īd	Port Said	بورسعيد	Port Said
EG-DT	Dumyāţ	Damietta	دمياط	Damietta
EG-JS	Janūb Sīnā'	South Sinai	جنوب سيناء	South Sinai
EG-KFS	Kafr ash Shaykh		كفر الشيخ	Kafr el-Sheikh
EG-MT	Maţrūḩ		مطروح	Matrouh
EG-KN	Qinā		قنا	Qena
EG-SIN	Shamāl Sīnā'	North Sinai	شمال سيناء	North Sinai
EG-SHG	Sūhāj	Sohag	سوهاج	Sohag

== Changes ==
The following changes to the entry have been announced by the ISO 3166/MA since the first publication of ISO 3166-2 in 1998:

Edition/Newsletter	Date issued	Description of change	Code/Subdivision change
ISO 3166-2:2007	2007-12-13	Second edition of ISO 3166-2 (this change was not announced in a newsletter)	Subdivision added: EG-LX Al Uqşur
Newsletter II-2	2010-06-30	Update of the administrative structure and of the list source	Subdivisions added: EG-SU As Sādis min Uktūbar; EG-HU Ḩulwān

== See also ==
- Subdivisions of Egypt
- FIPS region codes of Egypt
- Neighbouring countries: IL, LY, PS, SD
