= Princess Khadija Palace =

Coordinates: 29.8458°N 31.3408°E

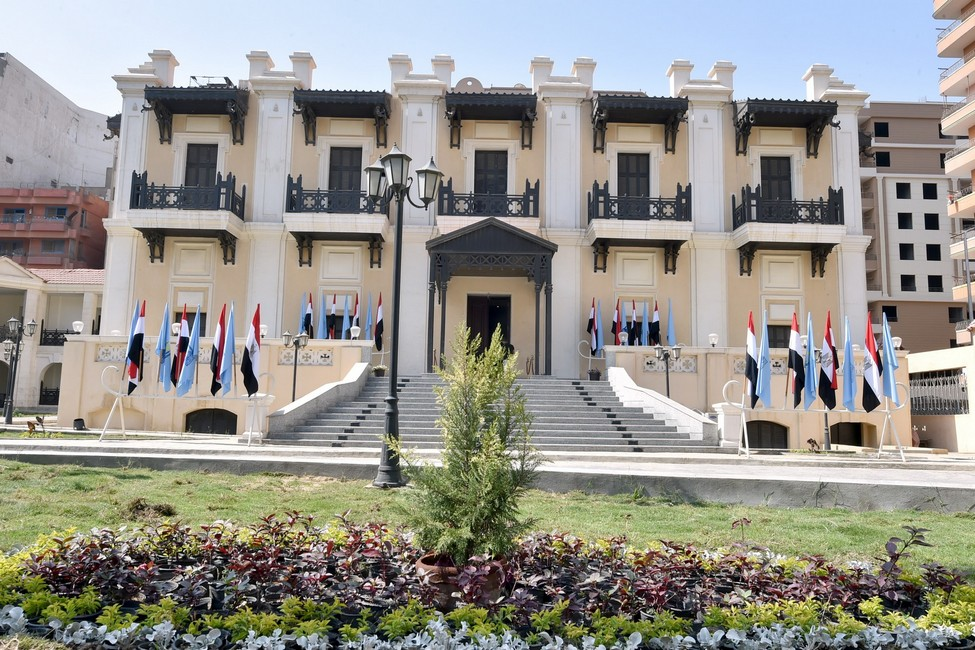
- Interactive map of the Princess Khadija Palace area

General information
- Location: Helwan, Cairo Governorate

Princess Khadija Palace (Arabic: قصر الأميرة خديجة) is a palace located in the Helwan district of Cairo. Built in 1895, it was gifted by Princess Khadija to the Ministry of Health in 1902 to serve as a hospital for chest diseases. Later, it became the headquarters of the Helwan district administration, until the Library of Alexandria converted it into a cultural center.

The main building of the palace covers an area of 500 square meters. It has two wings, the western wing measuring 300 square meters and the southern wing 200 square meters. The palace also contains 50 halls ranging in size from 25 to 100 square meters. It was built in the classical architectural style, influenced by the European Renaissance.

== History ==
Princess Amina Hanem, nicknamed "Mother of Benefactors," purchased a plot of land for 6,000 gold pounds and built the palace in 1895 for her daughter to live in, near her own palace. The cost of the buildings reached 150 gold pounds. Princess Khadija lived there and then gifted it to the Ministry of Health in 1902 to be used as a hospital for chest diseases.
