= Rubble masonry =

Type of building stone

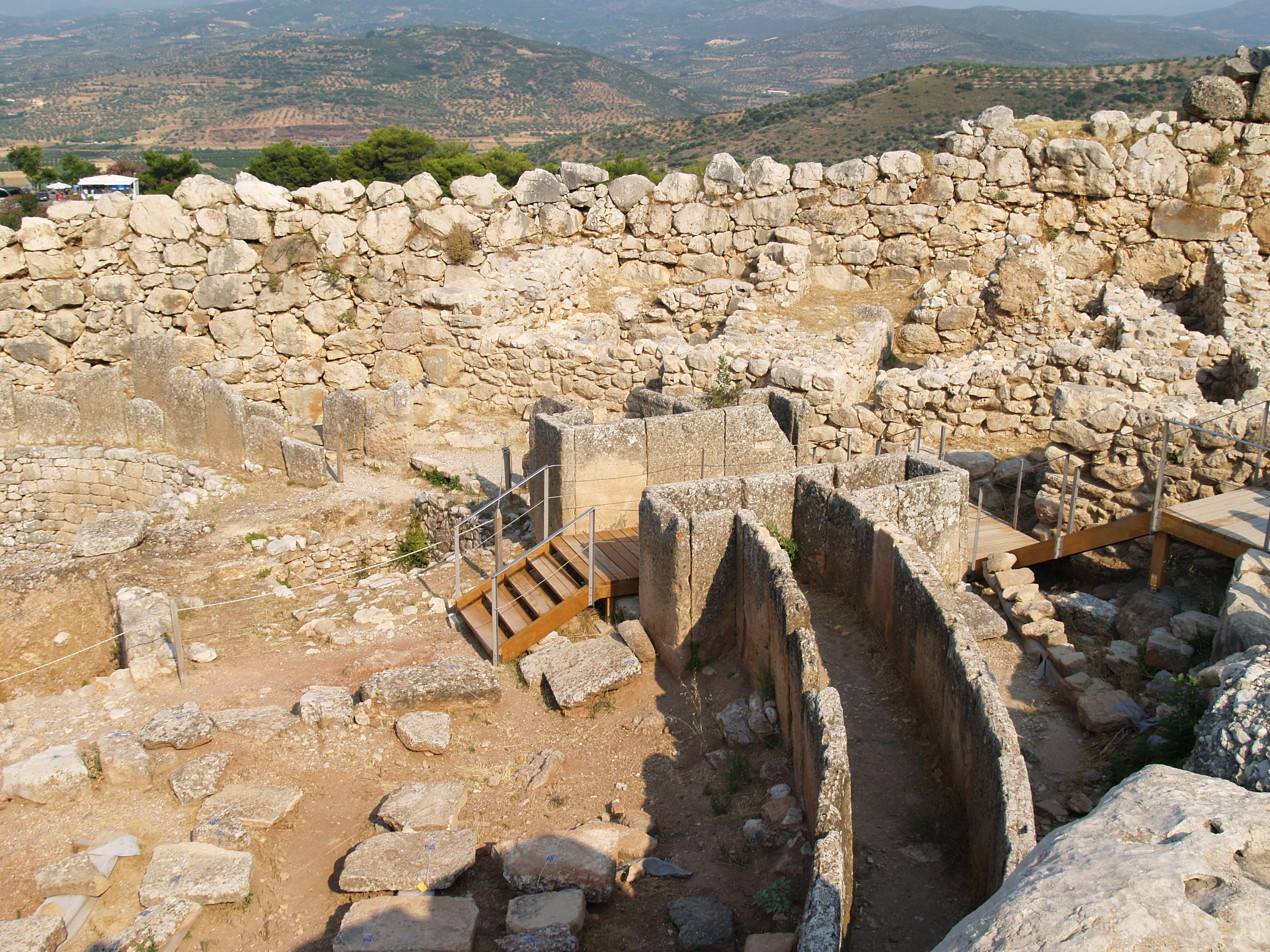
The wall at Grave Circle A, Helladic cemetery of Mycenae, Greece, 16th century BCE

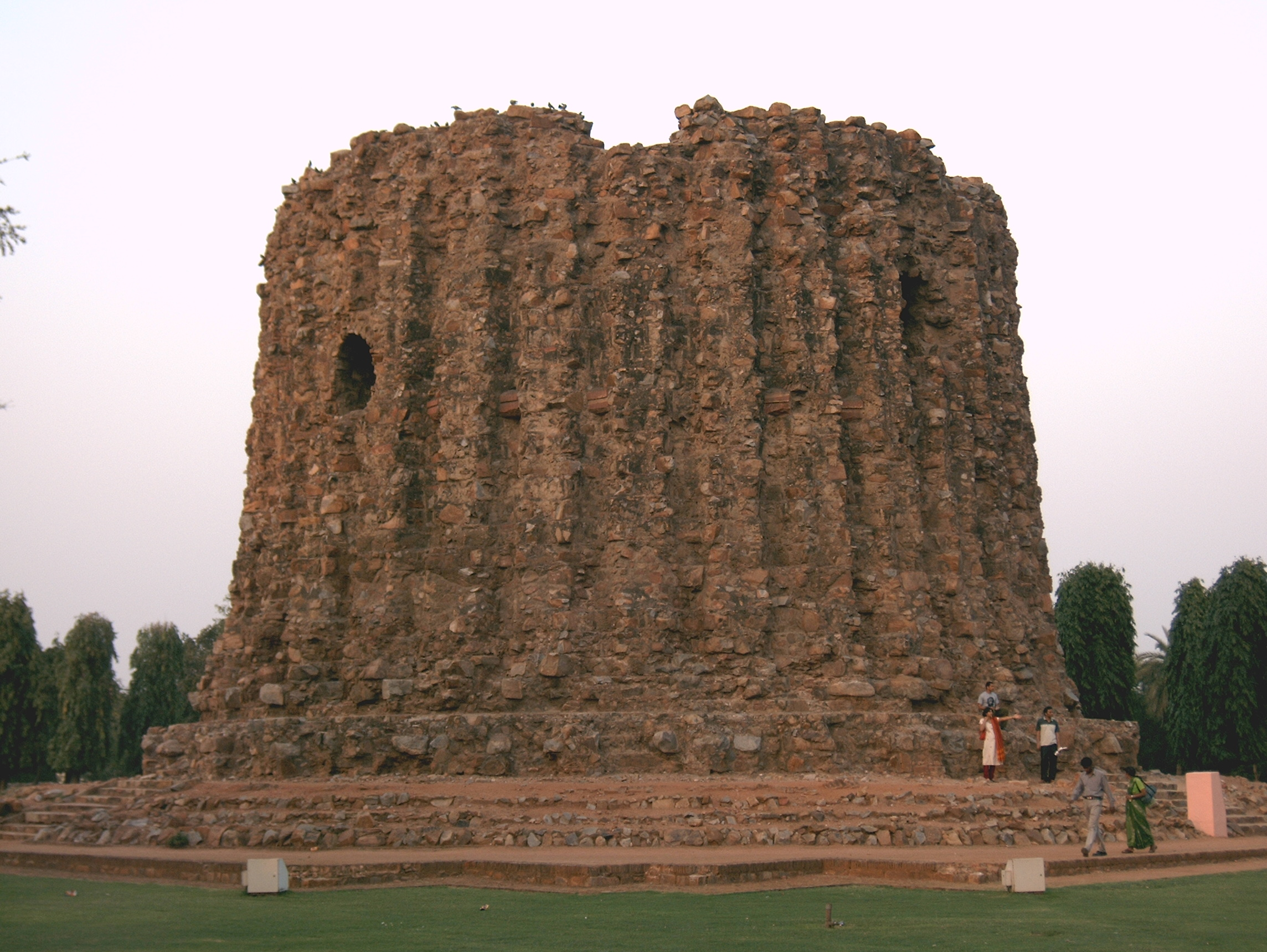
Rubble masonry core of the unfinished Alai Minar in the Qutb complex, India, c. 1316 CE

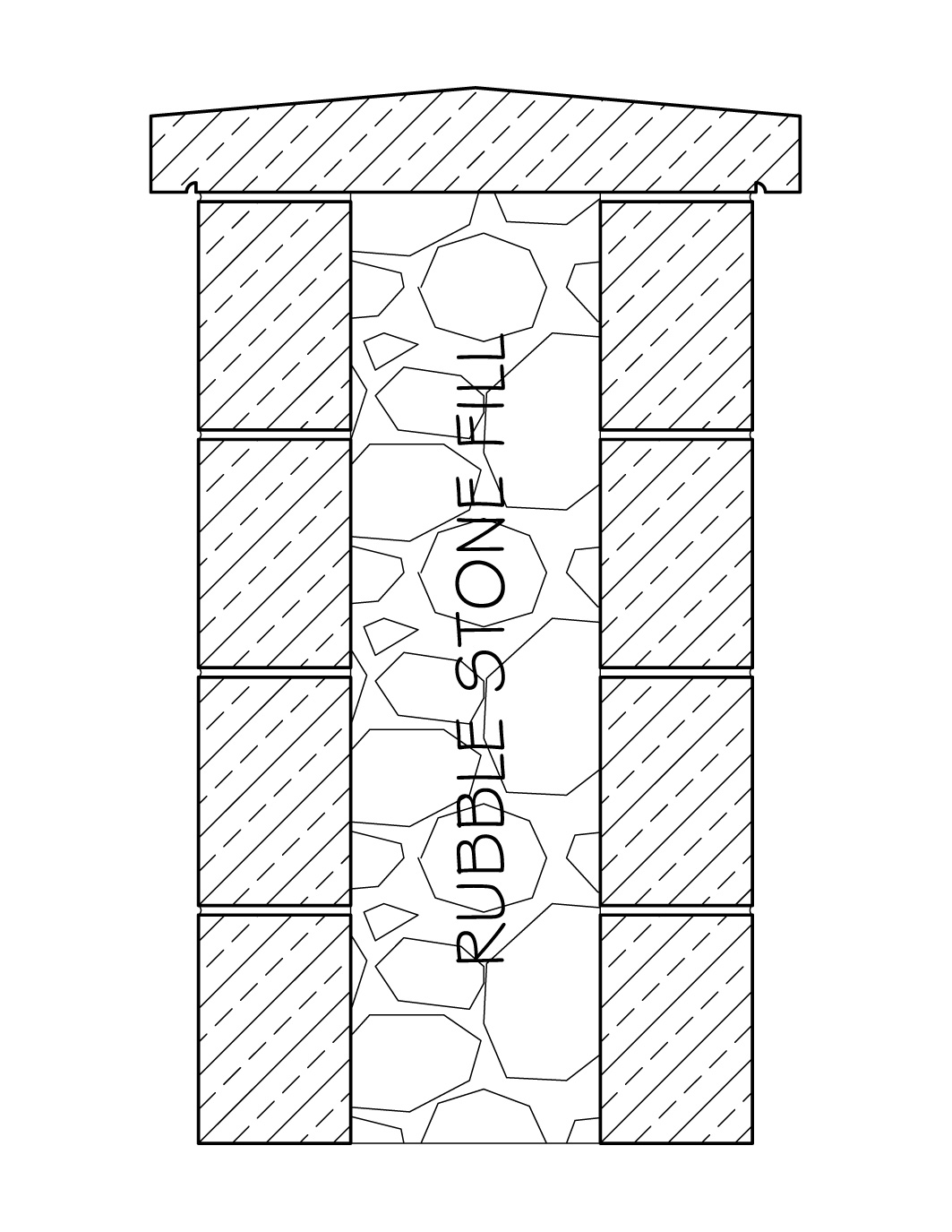
Section of a regularly laid ashlar wall with rubble masonry fill

Rubble masonry or rubble stone is rough, uneven building stone not laid in regular courses. It may form an outer surface of a wall, or fill the core of a wall which is faced with unit masonry such as brick or ashlar. Some medieval cathedral walls have outer shells of ashlar with an inner backfill of mortarless rubble and dirt.

== Square rubble masonry ==
Square rubble masonry consists of ashlar stones set in mortar, that make up the outer surface of a wall.

== History ==
The Sadd el-Khafara dam (2900–2600 BC) in Wadi Al-Garawi near Helwan in Egypt, is 14 meters high, filled with rubble masonry, and clad in unmortared stepped ashlar stones.

The Greeks called the technique of constructing two parallel walls filled with a core of rubble or other infill emplekton, notably used erecting defensive walls of their poleis.

The Romans made extensive use of rubble masonry, calling it opus caementicium, after the name (caementicium) given to the filling between two revetments. The technique continued to be used over the centuries, particularly for defensive walls and large works during medieval times.

In contrast, modern construction frequently uses cast concrete with an internal steel reinforcement, which allows for greater elasticity and provides excellent static and seismic resistance.

== See also ==
- Gabion—Metal cages filled with stones
- Snecked masonry—Masonry made of mixed sizes of stone but in regular courses
- Wattle and daub—Conceptually analogous to rubble within ashlar in the sense that a frame is filled in with a filler material
