= Japanese Garden (Helwan) =

Japanese garden in Helwan, Cairo, Egypt

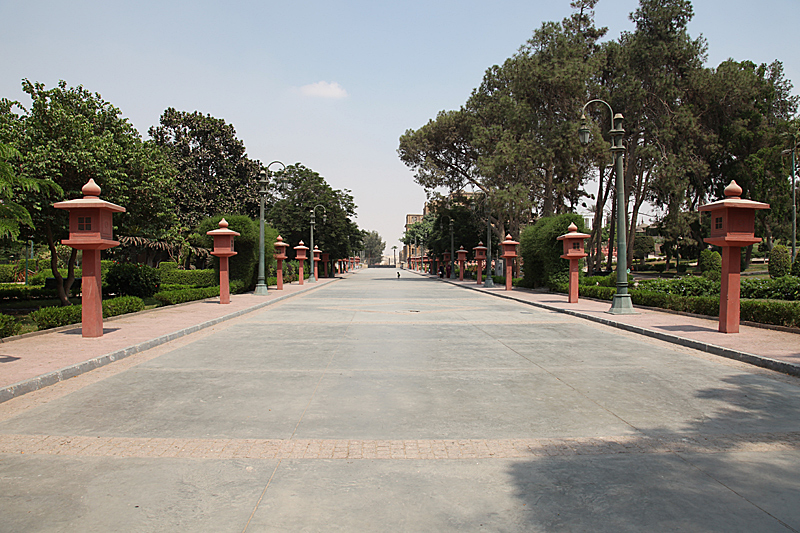
- Interactive map of Japanese Garden
- Type: Public Garden
- Location: Mustafa El Maraghi Street, Helwan, Cairo, Egypt
- Coordinates: 29°50′56″N 31°20′25″E
- Area: 40,468 m^{2} (435,590 sq ft)
- Created: 1922
- Operator: Specialized Gardens Project – Cairo Governorate
- Status: Open (until 6:30 pm)

The Japanese garden in Helwan is a public garden created by the architect Zulfiqar Pasha 1919 in the Asian style to symbolize the civilizations of the East. Located in the Helwan district of Cairo, it was originally called the "Asian Life Kiosk" and later renamed the "Japanese Garden." It covers an area of 40,468 square meters (approximately 10 acres) and its design was completed in 1922.

In 1990, the Cairo Governorate incorporated the garden into its Specialized Gardens Project. Then, in January 2005, it began implementing its major project to develop the garden and rescue it from the neglect it had suffered over the years, restoring it to its former glory in June 2006 at a cost of 5.5 million Egyptian pounds.

== Garden Contents ==
The garden contains several statues symbolizing different historical periods, such as a lotus flower statue supporting a statue of Zulfiqar Pasha, the garden's designer. Surrounding the statue are statues of Eastern elephants guarding the grounds. There is also a statue of the face of life, depicting a woman with closed eyes and a shy smile, reflecting the Eastern reverence for women. Additionally, there are 48 statues of disciples of "Sheba," seated to teach them Buddhism before the large lake. The lake also features a statue of the Triad of Wisdom, urging people to refrain from interfering in others' affairs: "Hear no evil, see no evil, speak no evil." This triad is represented by three monkeys: one covering its ear for "hear no evil," another closing its eyes for "see no evil," and the last covering its mouth for "speak no evil." The garden also includes a lotus lake, a music kiosk, and trees.

All the garden gates are closed except for the main gate, which is open to visitors. Beyond it, a path divides the garden into two sections. To the right is the statue of the Face of Life. After climbing the steps, you'll find a large shaded area with seating next to a statue of Zulfiqar Pasha's headless body, supported by a lotus flower. Around this is a statue of the "Three Elephants," enclosed by a low iron fence.

At the far end of the park sits the teacher, "Shiba, and his 48 students," gathered around him in front of the dry lake, which some visitors call "Ali Baba and the Forty Thieves." They are surrounded by an iron fence, with remnants of trees and visitor litter behind them. Below them stands the statue of the three wise monkeys. The park also features some amusement rides for children to enjoy.

There is also a music kiosk, once used by musical groups. A Buddha statue sits smiling at children who come to play with it and take souvenir photos. In front of it is a lake, the only one with water, where children play in small boats. The other lakes in the park are dry. The park also contains a number of rare trees.

== Photo Gallery ==
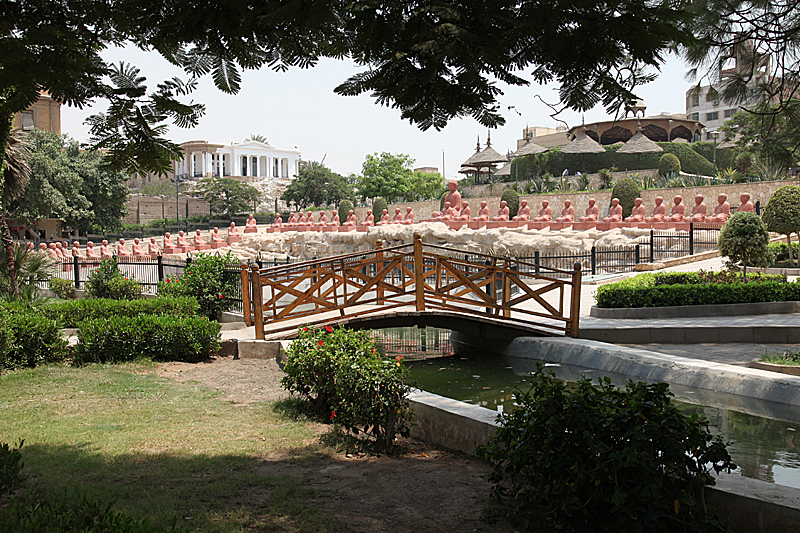
Photo of the teacher's area and 48 of his students

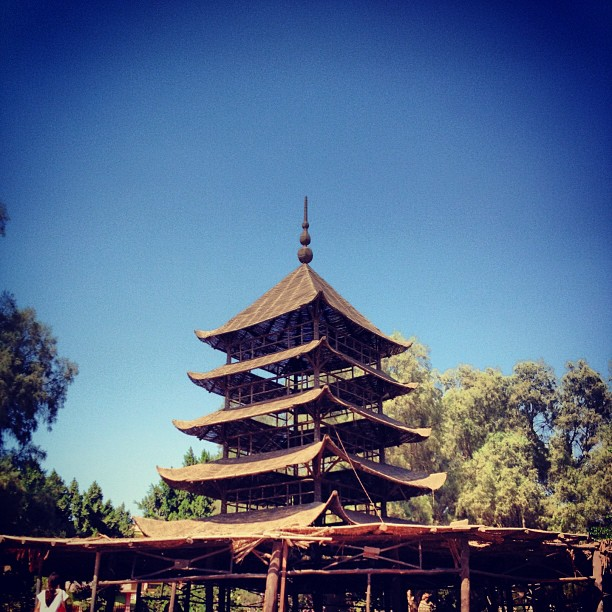
The music kiosk in the garden

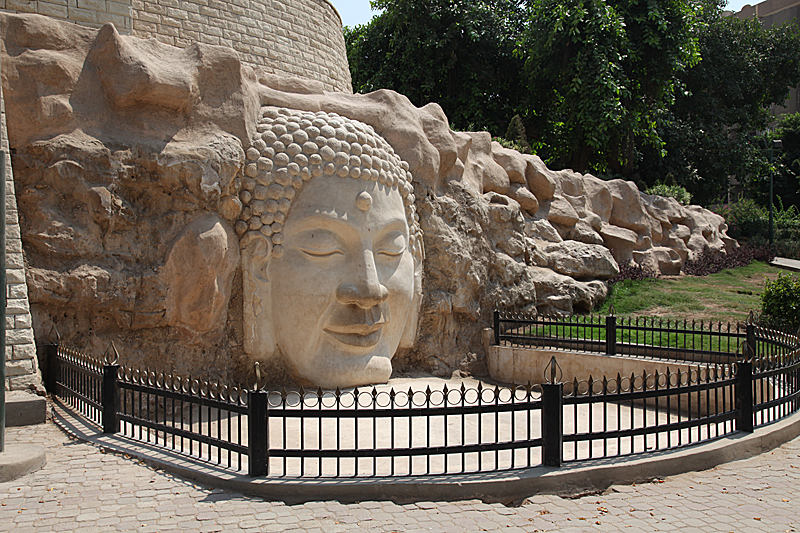
The statue of the face of life

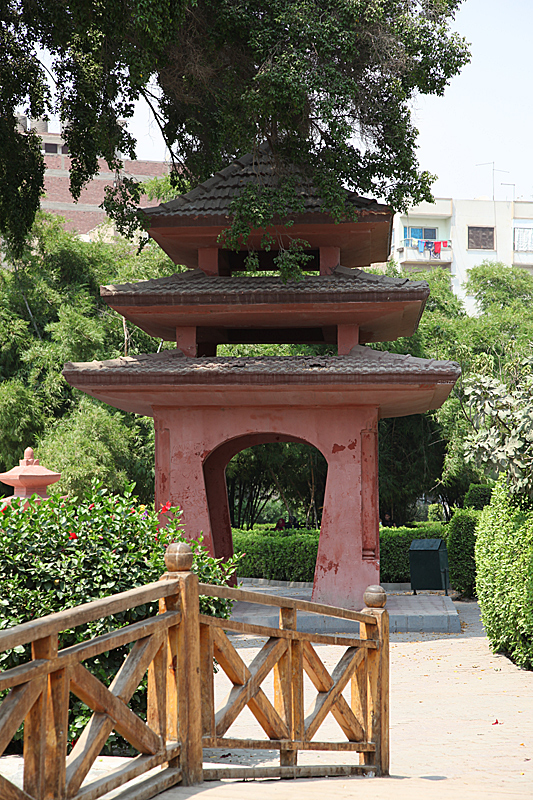
Model of the Buddhist temple

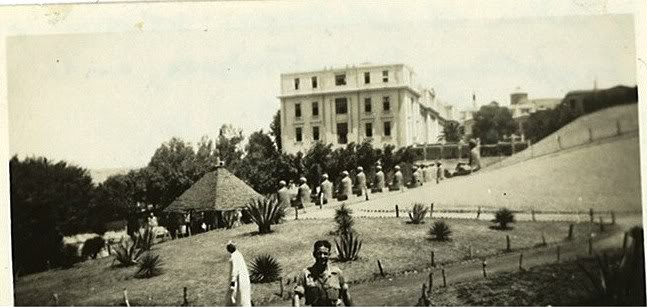
An old photo of the garden dating back to 1941

== See also ==
- Capritage Garden
- Capritage Helwan
