= El Tebbin =

El Tebeen التبين ϩⲁⲗⲟⲩⲁⲛ
- District
- Hayy El Tebin
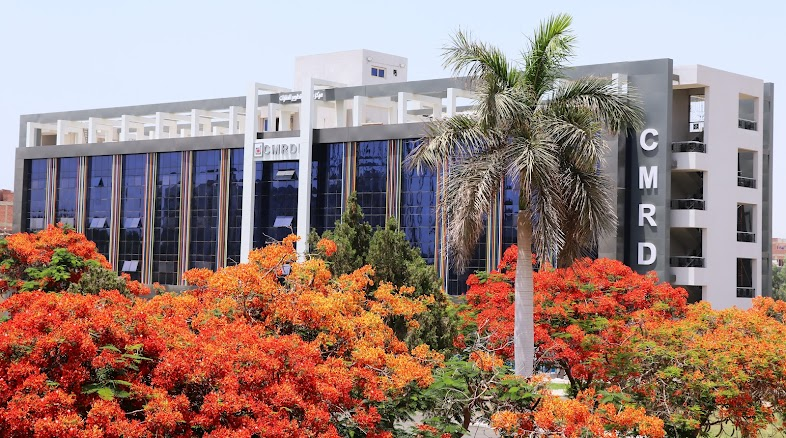
- Company

- Location in Egypt
- Coordinates: 29°50′43″N 31°20′00″E
- Country: Egypt
- Governorate: Cairo

Area
  - Total: 25 sq mi (65 km^{2})

Population (2018)
  - Total: 73,845
- Time zone: UTC+2 (EGY)
  - Summer (DST): UTC+3 (EEST)

Al-Tabin Al-Tebben and Alos (التبين) is one of the Districts of Cairo Governorate in the Southern Region, it was previously affiliated with Helwan Governorate It remained affiliated with Giza Governorate until 1989.

== Date ==
=== Old ===
It was mentioned in Amelino's geography that it is one of the ancient Pharaonic villages. Amelino mentioned in his geography a village called "Tahbin." He said: "He searched for it but could not find any evidence of it due to the disappearance of its name. Through research, it became clear to me: Tahbin is the Coptic name for this village of Al-Tabin, and it was mentioned in Al-Tuhfa from the works of Al-Atfihiyah, next to the country of the aforementioned center. It consists of two kafrins, about one hundred and thirty meters apart, and its buildings are made of mud flaps, small stones, bricks, and bricks, and most of them are on one floor. It has palm trees and two mosques, and most of its people are Muslims, and it earns its income from selling the gypsum they bring from the mountain and from growing grains and maize. He also mentioned, "Among its incidents is that Yassin Bey, one of the disobedient Mamluk princes, descended on it, plundered it, and did evil to it, and he did the same to the villages surrounding it.

Al-Tabin Al-Kafra Dam is a backfill dam on Wadi Al-Qarawi, 10 km southeast of Helwan and east of Al-Tabin. The dam was built in the first half of the third millennium BC by the ancient Egyptians to control floods and is the oldest dam of this size in the world. The first water dam in history was constructed in Wadi Jarawa, south of Tabin, in the Pre-Dynastic Era.

=== Hadith ===
Al-Tabin was affiliated with Giza Center, and in the year 1905 a decision was issued to annex it to Al-Saff Center, because it was located on the eastern shore of the Nile, then it was attached to Helwan, and it was separated from Helwan District in 1990 And it became Al-Tabin neighborhood and May 15 (city) Then the May 15 neighborhood separated from the Tabbin neighborhood in 2001 and remained affiliated with Helwan Governorate until the governorate was abolished and became affiliated with Cairo Governorate.

== Institutions ==
companies; Al-Tabin is considered one of the major industrial cities with many companies and factories, such as: from factories;

- The Egyptian Iron and Steel Company was one of the largest iron companies in the Arab world. (Closed 2021)
- National Cement Company. (Liquidated by the Egyptian government in 2019)
- Helwan Cement Company.
- Al-Nasr Coke Manufacturing Company. (In September 2022, the extraordinary general assembly of Al-Nasr Coke Manufacturing Company decided to liquidate the company's business.)
- Egyptian Metals Company.
- Helwan Fertilizer Company.

From research institutes;

- Metal Research and Development Center, taught by students of Helwan University.
- Tabbin Institute for Mineral Studies.

schools; It contains many school at different levels of education from kindergarten to general and industrial secondary schools.

== Geography ==
space; The total area is: 431.1 km2 and the inhabited area: 4.895 km2 Administrative boundaries of the district; Eastern border: desert hinterland. Western border: Nile River. The northern border: Helwan and May 15 (city). The southern border: in the south Al-Saff Center Giza.

== Transportation ==
The city's transportation network: Public Transport Authority bus lines to different areas and a service stop.

== Population and regions ==
Population; The city of Tabbin has a relatively low population census as population census reached 73,385 people according to the official census for the year 2018, including 36,964 males and 36,421 females. The nature of the population is the origin of the same population in the past, or immigrants from underdeveloped governorates to work in the iron, steel, coke sector and various factories in the city. Sheikhs; Al-Tabin neighborhood consists of suburbs and sheikhs:

- Al-Tabin Marine.
- Tribal identification.
- Mokr Al-Tabin.
- Steel City.
- Al-Tabin Public Residences.

== See also ==
- Helwan Governorate
- Cairo Governorate
