= Winckler–Caetani theory =

Archaeological theory

The Winckler–Caetani theory, named after its two most distinguished proponents, Hugo Winckler and Leone Caetani, claims that Prehistoric Arabia was originally a land of great fertility and the first home of the Semitic peoples. Through the millennia, it was undergoing a process of steady desiccation, a drying up of wealth and waterways and spread of the desert at the expense of the cultivable land. The declining productivity of the peninsula, together with the increase in the number of inhabitants, led to a series of crises of overpopulation and consequently to a recurring cycle of invasions of the neighboring countries by the Semitic peoples of the peninsula. It was these crises that carried the Assyrians, the Aramaeans, Canaanites (including the Phoenicians and Hebrews), and finally the Arabs themselves into the Fertile Crescent. The Arabs of history would thus be the undifferentiated residue after the great invasion of ancient history had taken place.

This theory has recently been replaced and significantly updated by Juris Zarins who proposes that a Circum Arabian Nomadic Pastoral Complex developed in the period from the climatic crisis of 6,200 BCE, partly as a result of an increasing emphasis in PPNB cultures upon animal domesticates, and a fusion with Harifian hunter gatherers in Southern Palestine, with affiliate connections with the cultures of Fayyum and the Eastern Desert of Egypt. Cultures practicing this lifestyle spread down the Red Sea shoreline and moved east from Syria into Southern Iraq.
