= List of governors of Cairo Governorate =

This is a list of governors of Cairo Governorate, the most populous of the Governorates of Egypt, since 1952.

== Governors from 1952–present ==
Person	Name in Arabic	Time as governor
Muhammad Kamel al-Qawish Bey	محمد كامل القاويش بك	April 1952 - November 1953
Mahmoud Metwally Nour	محمود متولي نور	November 1953 - October 1954
Abdul Fattah al-Bandari	عبد الفتاح البنداري	October 1954 - August 1958
Abdel Aziz Safwat	عبد العزيز صفوت	August 1958 - September 1960
Salah Desouky	صلاح دسوقي	September 1960 - July 1965
Mohamed Saad Zayed	محمد سعد زايد	July 1965 - April 1970
Muhammad Wajih Tawfiq Abaza	محمد وجيه توفيق أباظة	April 1970 - Juny 1971
Ibrahim Mustafa Baghdadi	إبراهيم مصطفى بغدادي	June 1971 - September 1972
Mohamed Hamdy Ashour	محمد حمدي عاشور	September 1972 - April 1974
Mahmoud Amin Abdel Hafez	محمود أمين عبد الحافظ	April 1974 – May 1977
Mohamed Saad el Din Mamoun	محمد سعد الدين مأمون	May 1977 - March 1983
Yousef Sabri Abu Taleb	يوسف صبري أبو طالب	March 1983 - April 1989
Mahmoud Sayed Ahmed Sharif	محمود سيد أحمد شريف	April 1989 - December 1993
Mohamed Omar Abdel-Akher	محمد عمر عبد الآخر	December 1993 - July 1997
Abdul Rahim Hashem Shehata	عبد الرحيم هاشم شحاته	July 1997 - July 2004
Abdel Azim Wazir	عبد العظيم مرسي وزير عبد الله	July 2004 - April 2011
Abdul Qawi Khalifa Ahmed Mukhtar	عبد القوي خليفة أحمد مختار	April 2011 - August 2012
Osama Ahmed Kamal	أسامة أحمد كمال	September 2012 - August 2013
Jalal Mustafa Mohamed Saeed	جلال مصطفى محمد سعيد	August 2013 - September 2016
Atef Abdel Hamid Mustafa	عاطف عبد الحميد مصطفى	September 2016 - August 2018
Khaled Abdel-Aal Abdel-Hafez		August 2018 – Present

== See also ==
- Cairo Governorate
