= 6th of October =

6th of October (October 6) is the 279th day of the year in the Gregorian calendar.

The date may also refer to:

- the Yom Kippur War, a war between Israel and Egypt and allied Syria which broke on October 6, 1973.
- the 6 October 1976 massacre, a massacre of student protestors in Thailand.

== Things in Egypt named after the war ==
- 6th of October Governorate a defunct governorate in Egypt
- 6th October City, a planned city built in Giza governorate
- 6th October Bridge, an elevated highway in Cairo, Egypt
