= 15th of May (city) =

15th of May City مدينة 15 مايو
- City
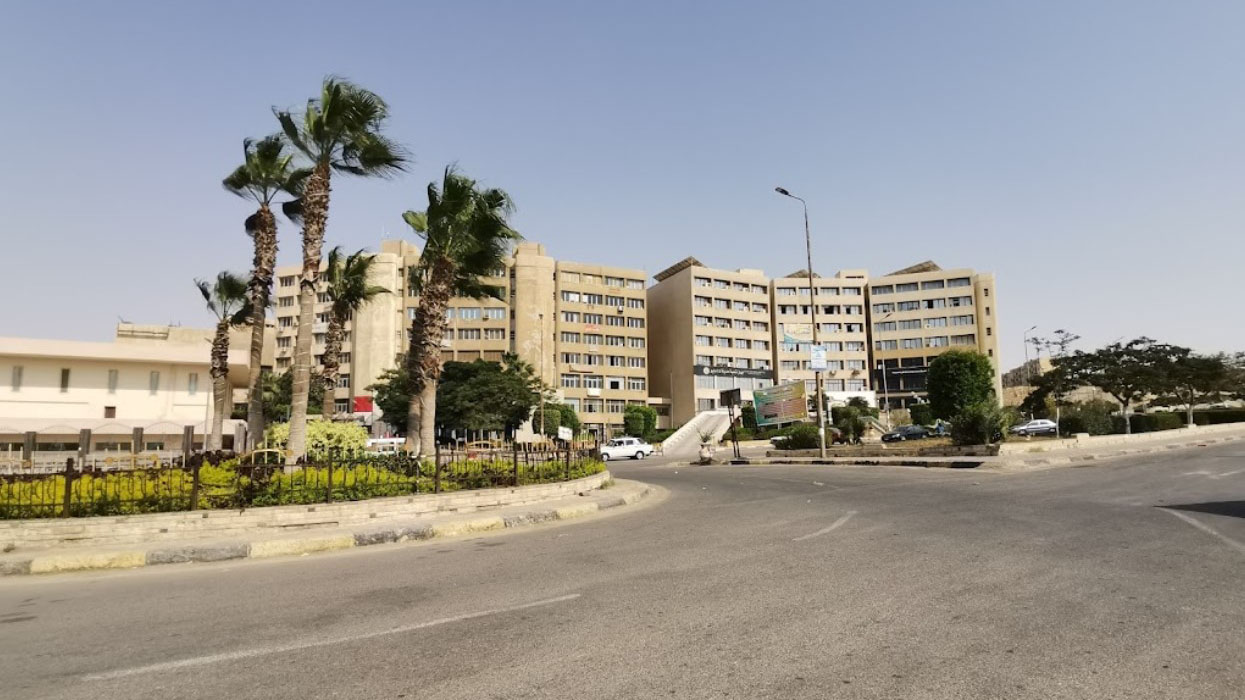

- Location in Egypt
- Coordinates: 29.831871°N 31.360050°E
- Country: Egypt
- Governorate: Cairo
- Metropolitan area: Greater Cairo
- Named for: Corrective Revolution

Area
  - Total: 75.99 km^{2} (29.34 sq mi)

Population (2023)
  - Total: 100,511
  - Density: 1,323/km^{2} (3,426/sq mi)
- Time zone: UTC+2 (EET)
  - Summer (DST): UTC+3 (EEST)

15th of May (Arabic: مدينة 15 مايو) is a new urban community and a satellite city of Cairo, Egypt, located to the south of it. Its cornerstone was laid in 1978 on an area of 6400 acres, which tripled to 18,000 acres by 2017. It was constructed to solve the problem of insufficient accommodation. However, after almost forty years, it had only 93,574 residents according to the 2017 census.

== Name ==
The name "15th of May City" was chosen to commemorate the Corrective Revolution (launched as the "Corrective Movement"), a reform program (officially just a change in policy) launched on 15 May 1971 by President Anwar Sadat. The revolution involved purging Nasserist officials and security forces deemed pro-Soviet and left-wing, while garnering popular support by framing the takeover as a continuation of the Egyptian Revolution of 1952. However, Sadat's Corrective Revolution also marked a significant shift in foreign policy, economy, and ideology, and included the imprisonment of political opponents in Egypt, including liberals and Islamists.

== Geography ==
The 15th of May is a new satellite city located in the southern area of Greater Cairo, and is administered by the New Urban Communities Authority.

=== Climate ===
Köppen-Geiger climate classification system classifies its climate as hot desert (BWh), as the rest of Egypt. Due to its closeness to Helwan, it has very similar averages.

Climate data for 15th of May City
Month	Jan	Feb	Mar	Apr	May	Jun	Jul	Aug	Sep	Oct	Nov	Dec	Year
Mean daily maximum °C (°F)	19.4 (66.9)	21.1 (70.0)	24.4 (75.9)	29.2 (84.6)	33.6 (92.5)	35.4 (95.7)	35.9 (96.6)	35.5 (95.9)	32.8 (91.0)	30.8 (87.4)	26.1 (79.0)	21.2 (70.2)	28.8 (83.8)
Daily mean °C (°F)	13.8 (56.8)	14.9 (58.8)	17.7 (63.9)	21.5 (70.7)	25.5 (77.9)	27.8 (82.0)	28.7 (83.7)	28.6 (83.5)	26.4 (79.5)	24.4 (75.9)	20.3 (68.5)	15.6 (60.1)	22.1 (71.8)
Mean daily minimum °C (°F)	8.2 (46.8)	8.7 (47.7)	11 (52)	13.8 (56.8)	17.5 (63.5)	20.3 (68.5)	21.6 (70.9)	21.8 (71.2)	20 (68)	18.1 (64.6)	14.5 (58.1)	10.1 (50.2)	15.5 (59.9)
Average precipitation mm (inches)	4 (0.2)	3 (0.1)	2 (0.1)	1 (0.0)	0 (0)	0 (0)	0 (0)	0 (0)	0 (0)	0 (0)	2 (0.1)	5 (0.2)	17 (0.7)
Source: Climate-Data.org (altitude: 87m)

== Economy ==
=== Industry ===
To the south, the 15th of May has a group of factories for many products.

=== Trading ===
15th of May city has several shopping malls, supermarkets and shops.

== Pollution ==
Although the city boasts a plentiful number of gardens and green areas, the city residents have, especially those living in the 3rd district, complained about bad odors in the early mornings, the city officials took little to no action to mitigate the problem indicating some hints of corruption.

== Education ==
The city has a group of schools such as the El Mostaqbal school.

=== Higher Education ===
The Higher Institute of Engineering is the most important educational foundation in the city. The city also host its own university known as May University.

== Religion ==
The city has a group of mosques which include:

- Masjid al Jafari
- Aly Ibn Aby Taleb
- Mostafa Mosque
- Al Fardos Mosque
- Al Radwan
- Masjid El-Nour
- Fatima, the Prophet Mosque

Also, the city has two churches:

- St. Mark's Church
- Church of Saint Virgin Mary & St. Athnasyous

== See also ==
- Greater Cairo
- Helwan
- List of cities and towns in Egypt
- Maadi
