= Sadd el-Kafara =

Ancient dam

Sadd-el-Kafara
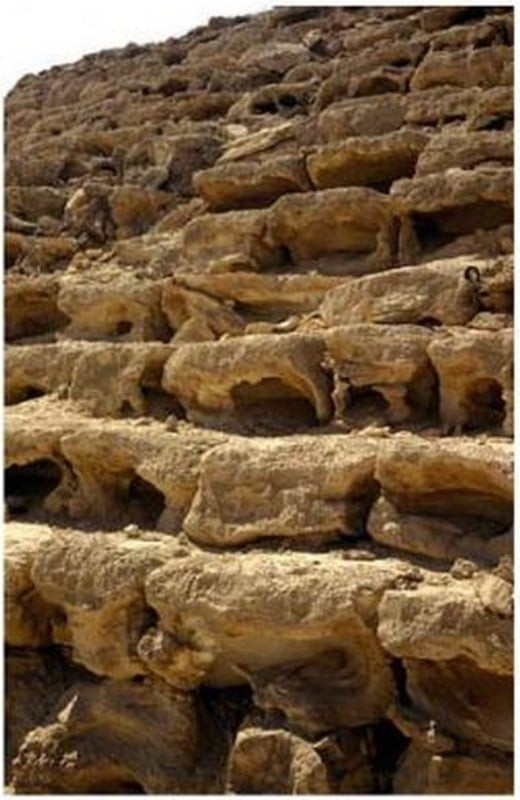

- Location within Egypt
- Location: Helwan, Helwan Governorate, Egypt
- Coordinates: 29°47′43″N 31°25′55″E
- Construction began: ~2650 BC

Dam and spillways
- Type of dam: Embankment, masonry
- Impounds: Wadi Garawi
- Height: 14 m (46 ft)
- Length: 110 m (360 ft)
- Width (crest): 56 m (184 ft)
- Width (base): 98 m (322 ft)

Reservoir
- Creates: Sadd-el-Kafara Reservoir
- Total capacity: ~570,000 m^{3} (20,000,000 ft^{3}) Est.

Sadd el-Kafara ("Dam of the Infidels") was a masonry embankment dam on Wadi al-Garawi 10 km southeast of Helwan in Cairo, Egypt. The dam was built in the first half of the third millennium BC by the ancient Egyptians for flood control and is the oldest major dam in the world. Never completed, the dam was under construction for 10–12 years before being destroyed by a flood. It was rediscovered by Georg Schweinfurth in 1885.

== Specifications ==
The dam was not finished but was about 111m long and 14m tall with a base width of 98m and crest width of 56m. The dam's core was 32m wide and consisted of 60,000 tons of earth and rock-fill. Surrounding the core were two loosely filled rubble and rock-fill layer-walls. The downstream wall was about 37m wide, the upstream wall about 29m wide and they encompassed 2,900 m^{3} (100,000 ft^{3}) of material. Encasing the dam were upstream and downstream walls created from limestone ashlars. The ashlars were set but not mortared in stepped rows. Each ashlar was roughly 30 cm (12 in) high, 45 cm (18 in) wide, 80 cm (31 in) long and roughly 50 lb (23 kg).

== Destruction ==
Because of erosion on the downstream face of the incomplete dam and its lack of a spillway, it is believed that a flood destroyed it. In addition, there was no evidence of a trench or tunnel that would have diverted water in the wadi around the construction site. Construction on the upstream side of the dam was mostly complete but the downstream side was much less developed. The crest of the dam sloped towards the center which the engineers may have intended to use as a spillway. However, as the top of the dam was not beheaded it was not protected from flood water that would over-top the crest. The dam's proximity to the fertile Nile River and distance from populations indicates it was built for protection against such events, similar to those that still occur today. If complete, the dam would have stored 465,000 m^{3} (16,400,000 ft^{3}) – 625,000 m^{3} (22,100,000 ft^{3}) of water and flooding would have caused the reservoir to flood into adjacent parallel wadis. The dam's failure likely made Egyptian engineers reluctant to construct another for nearly eight centuries.

Another indication that the dam may have been diminished due to flooding, or an overflow, is that the dam, itself, did not contain high quantities of silt, implying that the dam did not last long enough for the river to leave an obvious residual fingerprint on it.

== See also ==
- Jawa Dam
