= El Masara =

Al Massarah المعصرة
- District of Cairo
- Hayy Al-Massarah
- Location in Egypt
- Coordinates: 29°50′43″N 31°20′00″E
- Country: Egypt
- Governorate: Cairo

Area
  - Total: 25 sq mi (65 km^{2})

Population (2023)
  - Total: 288,880
- Time zone: UTC+2 (EET)
  - Summer (DST): UTC+3 (EEST)

Al-Maasara (Arabic: حي المعصرة) neighborhood is one of the neighborhoods of Cairo Governorate. It is located in the southern region of Cairo Governorate, Egypt. It was previously part of the Helwan neighborhood.

== History ==
Al-Ma'asara has been a historical area since the ancient Egyptian era. It was called the land of "Goshen", then "Shahran" in the Coptic era, and "Al-Ma'asara" in the Islamic era.
