= Helwan wax museum =

Coordinates: 29°51′37″N 31°19′33″E

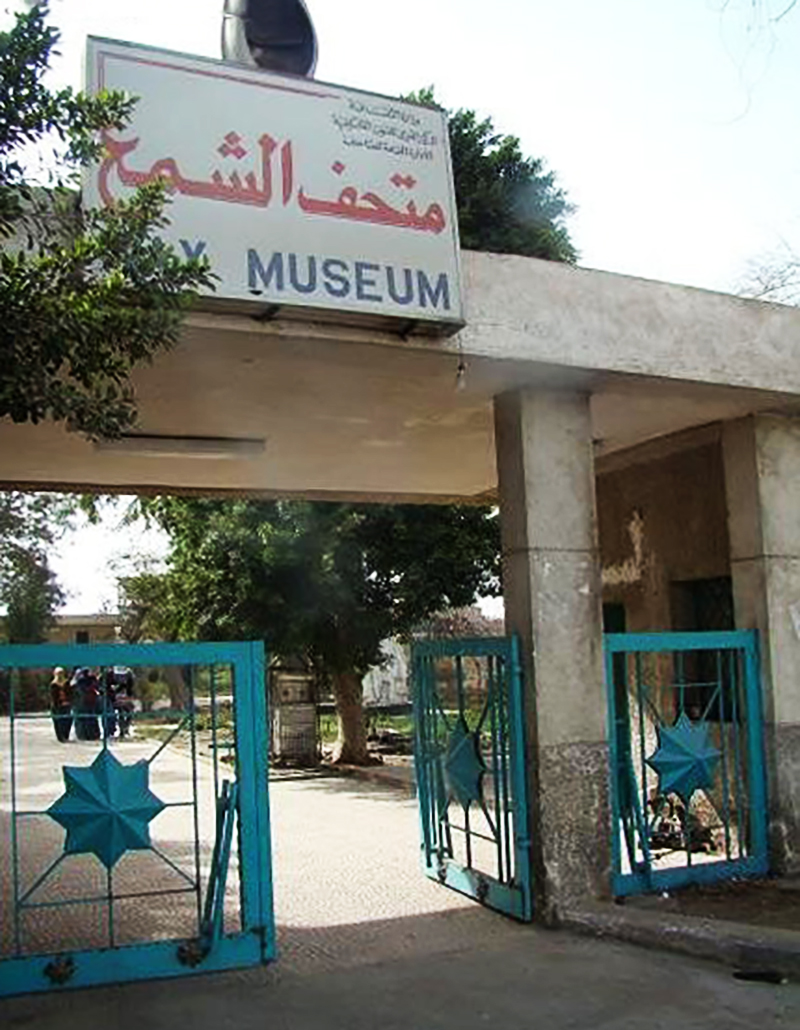

The Helwan Wax Museum is a small public museum located in the suburb of Helwan, in Cairo, Egypt, close to the Ain Helwan Metro station. It houses 116 statues and 26 scenes. The museum was established in 1934, however it is currently closed for renovations.

== History ==
The Wax Museum was built in 1934 by artist Fouad (George) Abdel-Malek, who studied waxworks in France. He received much help from a group of devoted artists and art admirers, who were inspired by internationally acclaimed waxwork museums in London, Amsterdam, Hong Kong, Las Vegas and New York. The Wax Museum in Egypt was initially opened at Tigran Palace at Ibrahim Pasha St. and moved in 1937 to a villa at Qasr al-Eini St. before it eventually arrived in its present seat in Ain Helwan district. Although the museum was opened officially in its current venue on August 6, 1950, it was added to the list of art museums supervised by the Ministry of Culture represented by the Sector of Fine Art in 1997.

Due to the lack of air conditioning, many of the wax sculptures on display exhibit visible damage and signs of repeated touch-ups.

As of early 2009, the museum has been closed for renovations. It was able to reopen partially in 2014, but closed again due to COVID-19.

== Collections ==
The museum's exhibits include 26 panoramic views and 116 wax sculptures, across 44 rooms. It contains exhibits of wax sculptures demonstrating important figures from Egyptian history and idealized traditional Egyptian culture. Some figures shown include Salah El-Din El-Ayoubi (Saladin), King Richard I "The Lionheart" of England, Amr Ibn Al-As, Cleopatra and President Gamal Abdel Nasser. Columns of shrines and traditional dresses also add to the curiosity-arousing atmosphere created in the museum. The exhibits are the reconstruction of religious, social and historical scenes and events such as the Virgin Mary, Jesus the Christ and her cousin at the cave of Abu-Serga in old Cairo. The last moments in the life of Egypt's Queen Cleopatra are also reconstructed. Cleopatra, in the throes of death, is seen escorted by her maid of honour and a priest. Visitors will also come across King Solomon and his throne. Other panoramic views illustrate Mohammed Ali Pasha inspecting the fleet of ships and the opening of Suez Canal.
