= Capritage Helwan =

Sulphur springs with healing properties in Helwan, established in 1840

Ain Helwan (Arabic: كابريتاج حلوان), also known as the Helwan Sulphur Springs, Helwan Baths, or the Helwan Sulphur Center for Natural Medicine, Rheumatology, and Rehabilitation (and more commonly as Helwan Sulphur Baths), is one of the most famous sulfur water springs in Egypt. Its fame stems from the high concentration of treated sulfur, reaching up to 27%. There are two springs in Helwan: one located near the Ain Helwan Metro Station, and another, also called Helwan Baths (or Helwan Sulphur Baths), which is the more well-known one on Mansour Street.

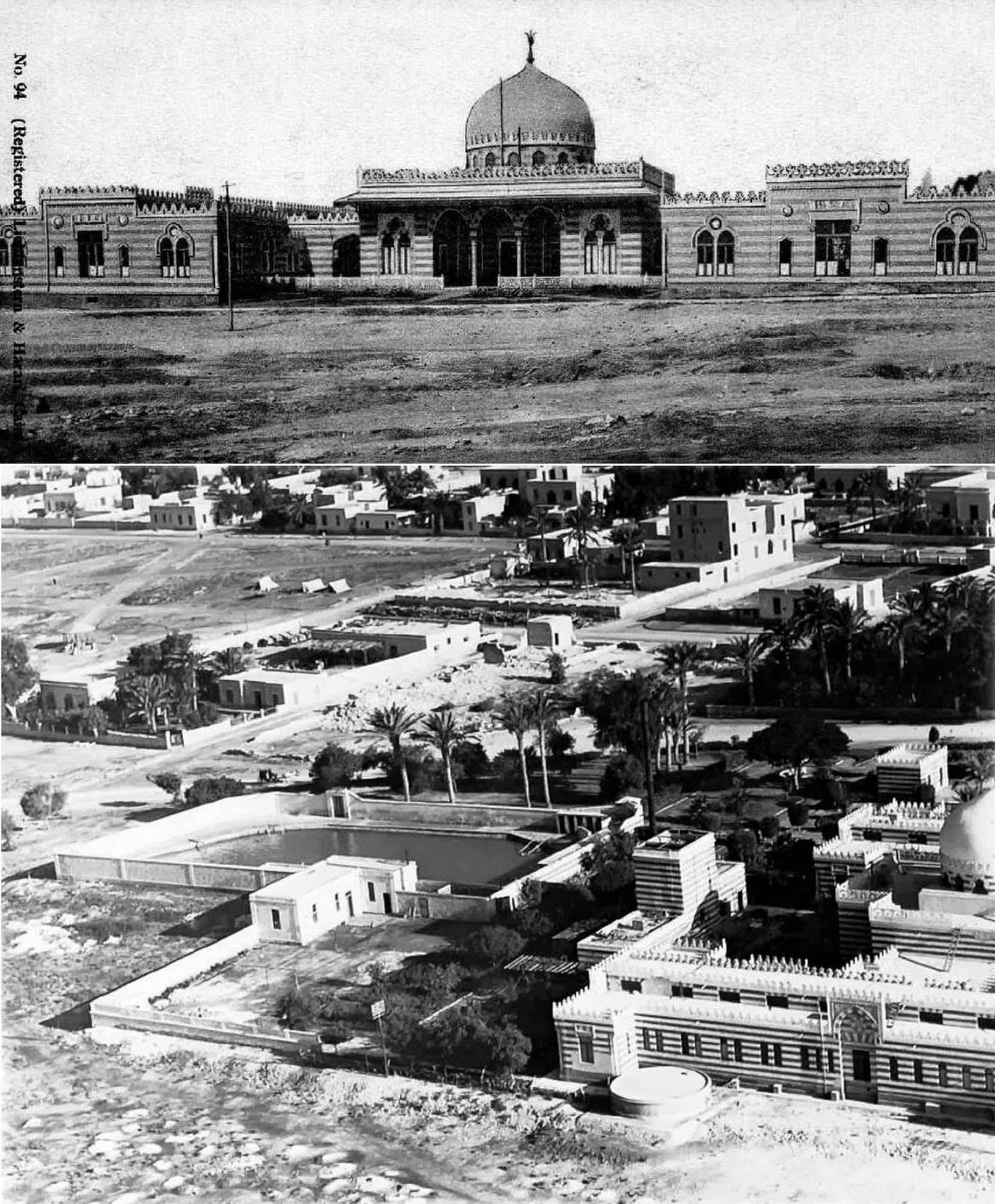

== Location ==
The Helwan springs are situated approximately 33 meters above the Nile River, about 4 kilometers from the river. The area encompassing the springs is roughly 4.5 kilometers from north to south and 3.5 kilometers from east to west, on Mansour Street in Helwan, near a large square (Martyrs' Square). There is a metro station nearby called Helwan. There is another spring in the Ain Helwan area with a sulfur spring and a swimming pool filled with sulfurous water for swimming.

== History ==
Ain Helwan was known in Ancient Egyptian times. It was mentioned in the Rosetta Stone in hieroglyphs as "Ain-An," where the ancient Egyptians considered it a divine act of charity. Interest in these springs increased during the reign of Caliph Abd al-Aziz ibn Marwan when the plague swept through Fustat in 690 AD. The Caliph sent scouts to find a suitable location for his residence, and they stopped in Helwan. There, he established his government, built barracks for soldiers, and moved the administrative offices. The springs then fell into disuse, only to reappear during the reign of Khedive Abbas I.

During the reign of Khedive Abbas, specifically in 1849, the army was encamped near Helwan. Many soldiers contracted scabies. One of these soldiers, while wandering in the desert towards the hills, discovered a strange spring containing sulfur. Upon bathing in it, his itching subsided, and he was cured. He informed his comrades, who were also cured. News of these soldiers reached the Khedive, who then sent soldiers suffering from skin diseases and rheumatism to the Helwan springs. Many civilians followed them, staying in tents and digging small holes to draw out the healing water.

In the summer of 1868, Khedive Ismail sent a committee to study these springs. He subsequently issued a decree to build a thermal spa resort, which was completed in 1871. The Grand Hotel (now a girls' secondary school) was built nearby. In 1872, the management of the resort was entrusted to Dr. Rayle (whose name graces a famous street in the city). He was one of the researchers who studied the therapeutic effects of the Helwan baths.

During the reign of Khedive Abbas Hilmi II, the bathhouse built during the reign of Khedive Ismail had deteriorated and fallen into disrepair. He ordered the construction of a new bathhouse built according to modern health standards, and the completion date was also specified. The renowned wealthy architect Suares oversaw the construction, which was supervised by the architect Battigelli. Khedive Abbas Hilmi II inaugurated it in 1899. In 1926, during the reign of King Fuad, the Egyptian government reclaimed the bathhouse from the hotel company that had been leasing it. The Ministry of Public Education took possession of it and converted it into the Helwan Secondary School.

== Helwan Sulphur Baths ==
Visitors often mistakenly believe that the Helwan Sulphur Baths are the same as the Helwan Springs due to the area's historical fame. However, this is incorrect. The Helwan Sulphur Baths are an extension of the springs, offering visitors, recreational facilities, and a swimming pool. The correct name is "Helwan Sulphur Baths." The Helwan Sulphur Baths have been removed from the map of therapeutic tourism in Egypt, but the Helwan Sulphur Center for Natural Medicine and Rheumatology, located at the sulfur springs, continues to operate at affordable prices.

== Fire ==
A fire broke out on Sunday, January 21, 2024, in the Al-Kabritaj tourist area designated for treatment with sulfur water. A number of fire engines from the Cairo Security Directorate moved to the place to extinguish the fire. The prosecution suggested that the cause of the fire was a lit cigarette thrown into the historical garden.
