= Behman Hospital =

Bahman Hospital

Geography
- Location: Cairo Helwan, Egypt
- Coordinates: 29.855168°N 31.337922°E

Organisation
- Type: Private Hospital

History
- Opened: 1940; 86 years ago

Behman Hospital (مستشفى بهمان) is the first hospital in Helwan, Egypt to treat psychiatry, mental illness, and addiction. It was founded in 1940 by Benjamin Behman.

== Date ==
After the establishment of the city of Helwan baths for sulfur springs there, medical tourism spread and increased in Helwan. This led to the emergence of many therapeutic centers and institutions there, such as the Al-Hayat Hotel and the Grand Hammamet Hotel. In 1940, she founded Bahman Psychiatric Hospital, which is one of the largest and leading medical centers for psychological care and education in the Middle East in Cairo in Egypt, specifically Helwan, and one of the most prominent hospitals that provides health care in the field of psychiatry. It is the first private psychiatric hospital in Egypt, making it the oldest in Egypt. The hospital began with twelve beds for patients, and in 1964, the hospital expanded to include one hundred and ten beds, and later reached two hundred and fifty beds. Choosing the hospital as a cooperative center for the World Health Organization in 1973 The hospital's training system was approved by the Arab Council of Psychiatry in 1997. Accredited as a training center by the Royal College of Psychiatrists in 1999, with experience gained here counting towards passing the UK MRCPsych exam. The hospital was included in the Department of Psychiatry at Wayne State University, Michigan, USA, in 2000 for its many contributions to the field of psychiatry. Other branches of the hospital are spread throughout the Middle East. Services provided by the hospital include general adult psychiatry, geriatric psychiatry, child and adolescent psychiatry, substance abuse clinic, psychological services, learning disabilities, and sleep disorders.

== Criticism ==
After the death of Omar Sharif the hospital was accused of not developing a good treatment plan for him, which was denied by the hospital administration. It explained that Al-Sharif had reached an advanced stage of Alzheimer's disease, which was difficult to treat during that period, and did not announce the causes of his death.

== Notable residents ==
=== Omar Sharif ===
The most famous stay of the international artist Omar Sharif in its last days was undergoing treatment for Alzheimer's disease, which struck him a year ago and reached an advanced stage that made it difficult to treat, and he was in the psychiatric hospital for at least more than three months. The only person who met him was his only son, Tariq, and his friend, Dr. Zahi Hawass, the famous archaeologist. However, when he died there, the hospital refused to provide any information about him or the causes of his death and his last days, as it considered the patient's file to be like military secrets, which no one may see. Zahi Hawass stated when announcing the news of his death, that the international artist had been admitted to the hospital about a month before his death after his health condition had declined significantly, but he did not improve, and quite the opposite happened. He remained in continuous deterioration during the last ten days, abstaining from taking any food. Food or drink until his death.

=== Najwa Salem ===
After her mother died, Najwa Salem (Egyptian Actress) was admitted to Bahman Hospital to receive treatment, as she needed psychological support.
