= Cairo Transportation Authority =

- هيئة النقل العام بالقاهرة
- Formation: 1976; 49 years ago
- Type: Government agency
- Headquarters: Cairo, Egypt
- Official language: Arabic
- Owner: Cairo Governorate
- Chairman: Rizq Aly

Cairo Transport Authority (CTA) is the operator of mass transit within Cairo, and the largest operator in Egypt.

CTA operates buses, ferries and river buses. Through its subsidiary Greater Cairo Bus Company (GCBC) it operates buses and minibuses, and is progressively converting its buses from diesel to low-emission CNG engines under the Cairo Air Improvement Project.

CTA operates more than 3,000 buses, 950 minibuses and 40 Nile ferries. With more than 37,000 employees, it offers transport services to more than 3.5 million riders a day.
