= Nile Corniche =

Road along the Nile in Egypt

(Arabic: كورنيش النيل)
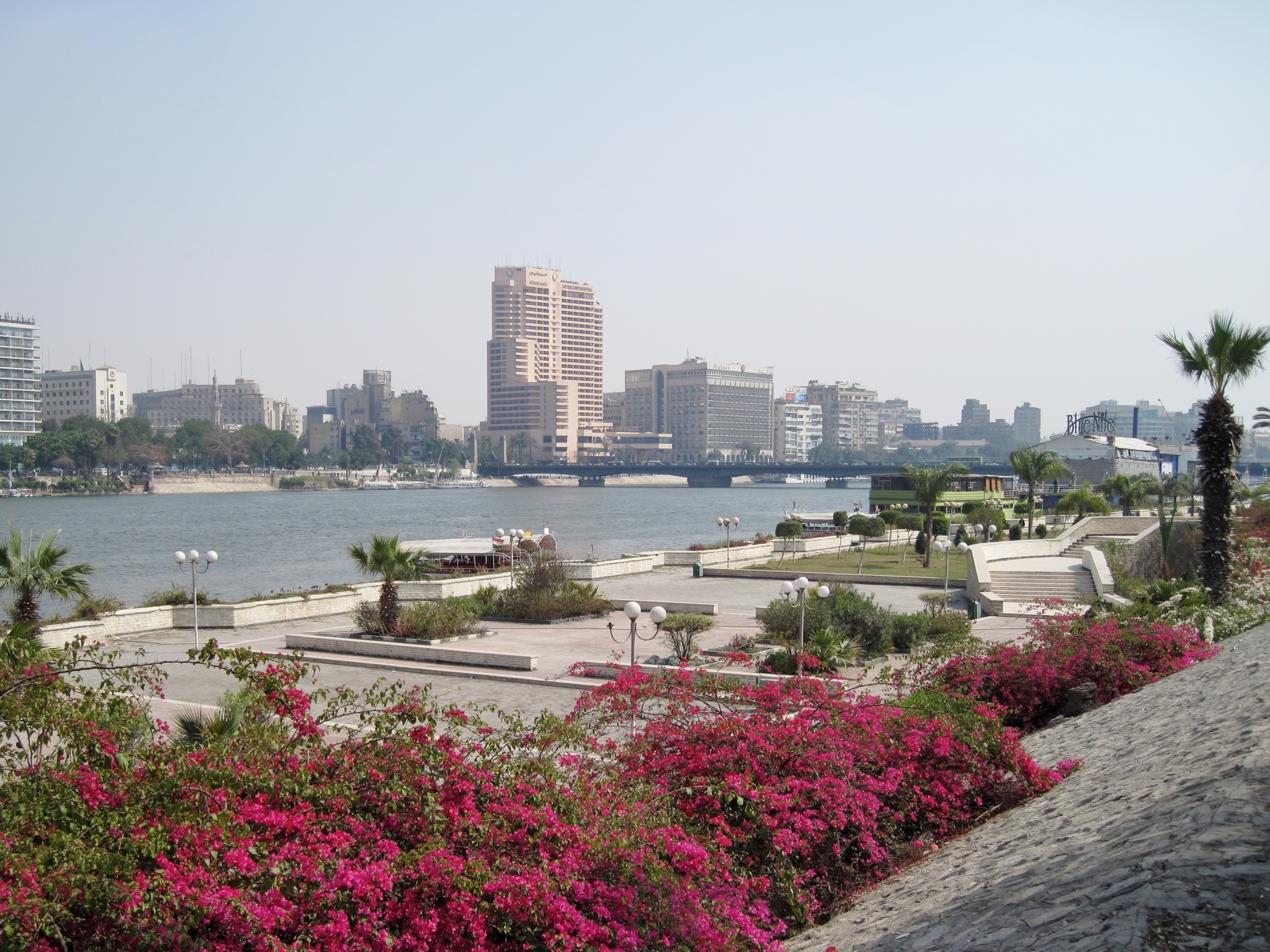
- Interactive map of Nile Corniche
- Native name: (Arabic: كورنيش النيل)
- Length: 6,650
- Width: ranging from 20 meters to 30 metres
- Area: Cairo, Helwan
- Location: Egypt
- Nearest metro station: Cairo Metro, Anwar Sadat, Orabi, Gamal Abdel Nasser, and others.

Construction
- Construction start: 1955
- Completed: 1955
- Inauguration: 1956

The Nile Corniche (Arabic: كورنيش النيل) is a road that extends along the length of the Nile River in almost all of Egypt's governorates and is one of the busiest streets in Cairo. It was established in 1955.

== Historical ==
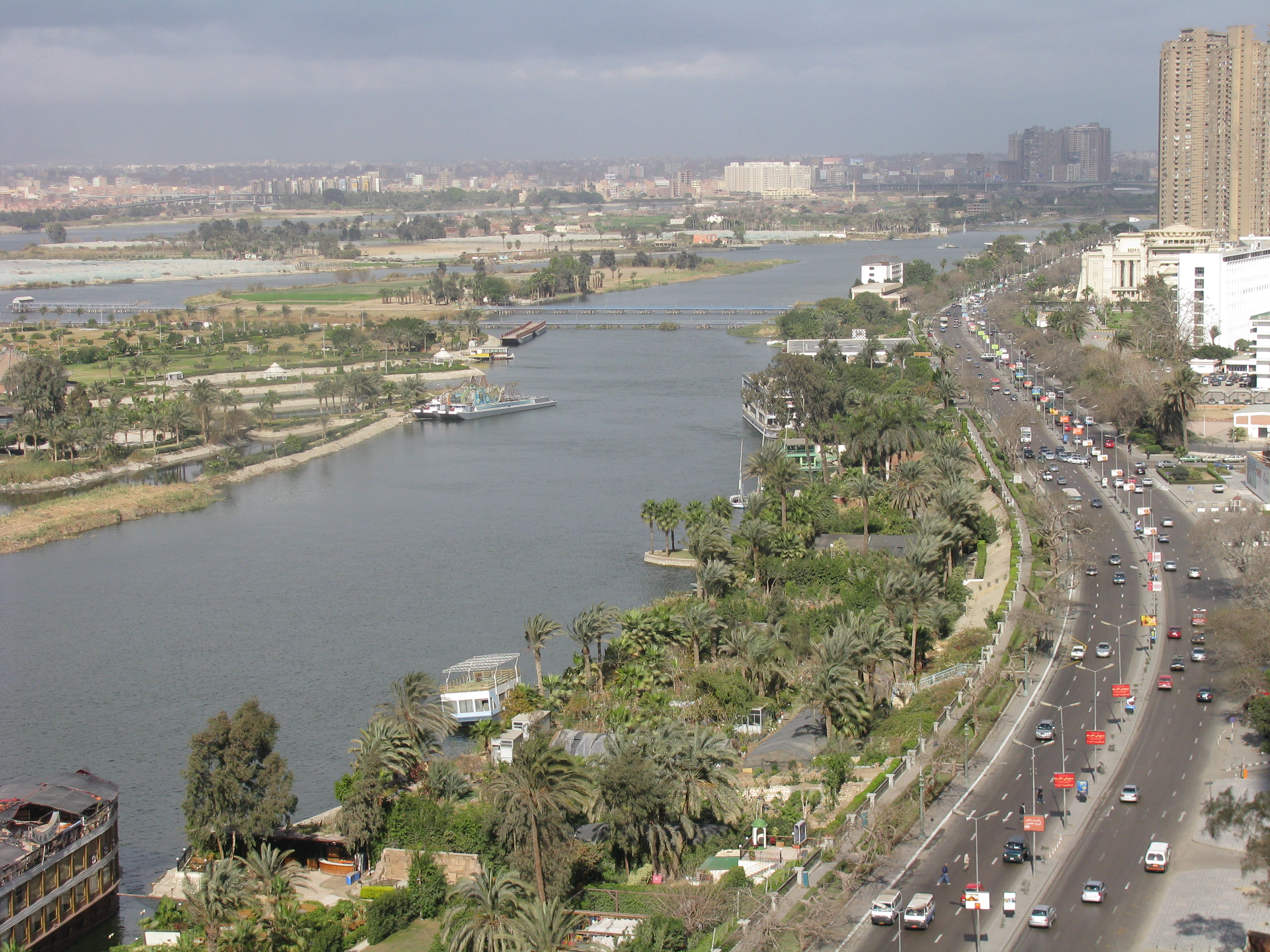
Nile Corniche in Cairo

At the beginning of the 1920s, foreigners dominated the large hotels along the Corniche walkway for tourist resorts for foreigners, and Egyptians were not allowed to enjoy the Nile River and the views overlooking it, and the enjoyment was only for the foreign and wealthy class, which was Their palaces and hotels overlooked The Nile River, including foreign embassies and consulates and English military barracks, which extended from Qasr al-Nil Bridge to Hilton Ramses Hotel near The Egyptian Museum.

=== After the July Revolution ===
After 1952 Egyptian revolution The Free Officers Movement and Gamal Abdel Nasser were especially keen to eliminate foreign manifestations in Downtown Cairo, and to gain their control and influence. The organization developed plans to develop the Nile River and create a street parallel to it extending from Shubra to Helwan. Before that, the Corniche Road was not complete and was full of barriers along the road, which impeded the passage of a road overlooking the Nile River directly, the government entrusted the then Minister of Municipalities and Rural Affairs (The Ministry of Local Development currently) to Abdul Latif Al-Baghdadi with the implementation of the Nile Corniche project. Al-Baghdadi began implementing the project, and there were many obstacles in his way. There were large areas of private land and public institutions as well, such as the Amiri Press, the shipyard, and foreign facilities. He demolished a number of palaces, villas, and facilities directly overlooking the Nile, and issued a warning to the embassies. foreign consulates and consulate buildings that were directly overlooking the Nile River. Al-Baghdadi gave the consulate officials a period of forty-eight hours to carry out the removal, but the consulates did not respond to such a warning and delayed remaining. So, by his order, he demolished a large part of those buildings to open the way for completion. The idea of the Corniche project, ignoring the fact that they were consulates of the great powers in the world, despite the presence of their armies in Egypt at that time, and this was like a historical change in the great powers. The Corniche project was completed in a short time, in only six months, although the idea of the project took more than four years, and it was opened in July of the year 1955. Wide celebrations and popular joy were held for it in the presence of Abdel Nasser, and that idea was a social transformation. In Egypt, Egyptians learned for the first time the idea of strolling along the Nile Corniche and enjoying its view and pure air, as one of the manifestations of the political challenge to the powers and privileges of foreigners in Egypt on the one hand, and a popular national project on the other hand.

== Negligence ==
In the early nineties, the Corniche was subjected to acts of bullying and monopoly by ship owners, in addition to the theft of the iron fence.

== Development ==
Several attempts have been made currently to develop the Corniche. At the beginning of the eleventh century, during the reign of Hosni Mubarak, the Corniche was developed by adding a new wall and establishing parks in it. In the year 2019 the Mamsha Ahl Misr was established with the aim of increasing the open spaces for hiking, to benefit from and develop natural tourism. The project preserved agricultural areas and facilities from erosion in the event of the collapse of the sides of the Nile River, and developed the Corniche, to change the view. General for all areas overlooking the Nile River, in addition to making material use of it, and creating designated places for bicycles, to encourage exercise and reduce the use of vehicles to protect the environment, and reduce car congestion at peak times Downtown Cairo.

== Photo gallery ==
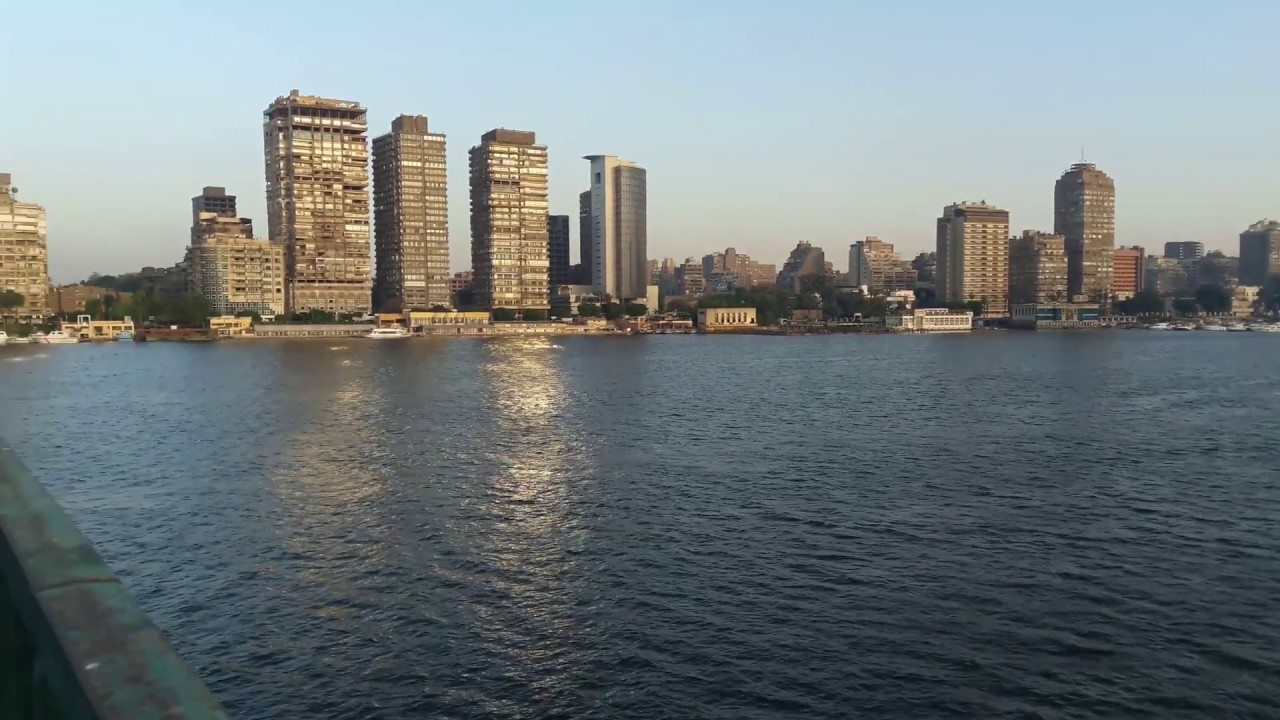

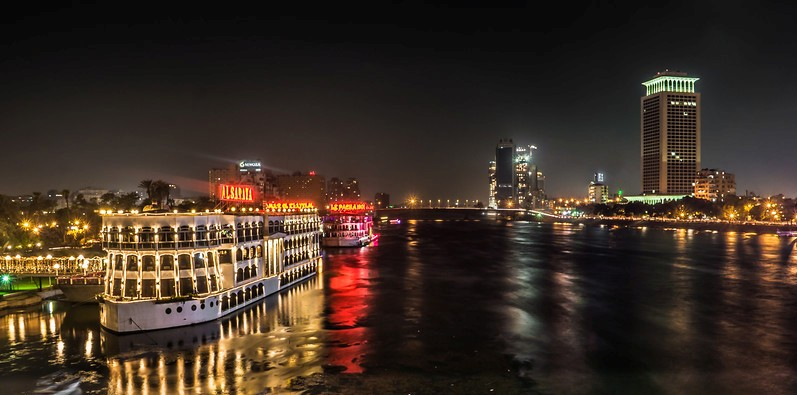

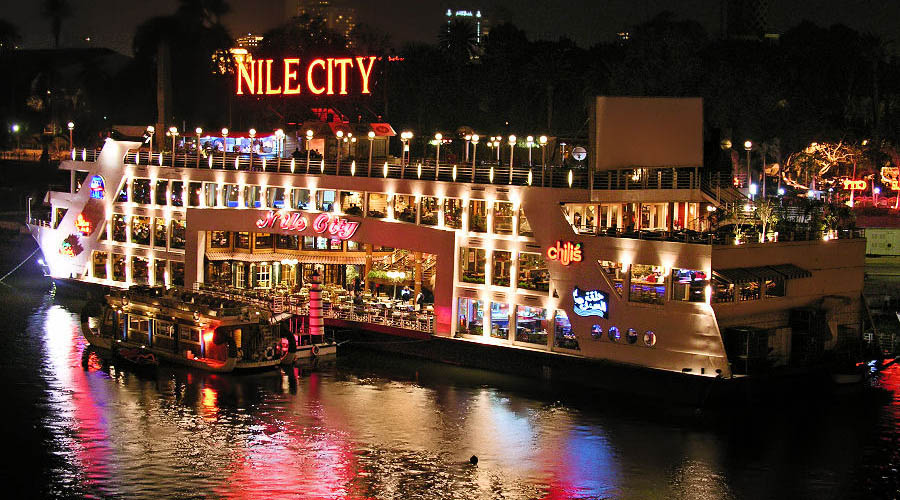

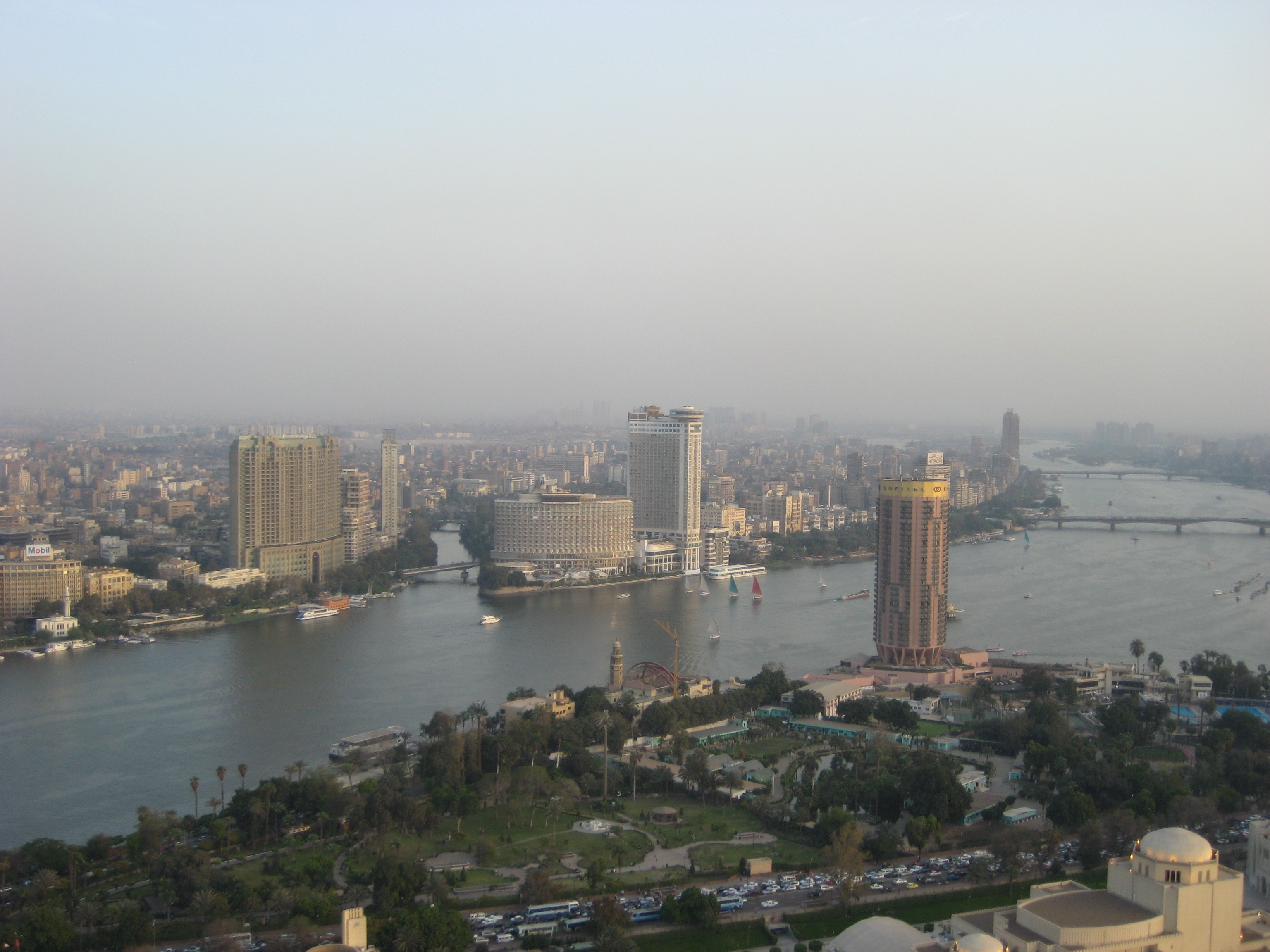
