= Helwan retouch =

Flint-tool fabrication technology

The Helwan retouch was a bifacial microlithic flint-tool fabrication technology characteristic of the Early Natufian culture in the Levant, a region in the Eastern Mediterranean (12,500 BP – 11,000 BP) such as the Harifian culture. The decline of the Helwan Retouch was largely replaced by the "backing" technique and coincided with the emergence of microburin methods, which involved snapping bladelets on an anvil. Natufian lithic technology throughout the usage of the Helwan Retouch was dominated by lunate-shaped lithics, such as picks and axes and especially sickles (which were predominantly—at least 80% of the time—used for harvesting wild cereals).
