= Helwan =

Helwan حلوان ϩⲁⲗⲃⲁⲛ, ϩⲁⲗⲟⲩⲁⲛ
- District of Cairo
- Hayy Helwan
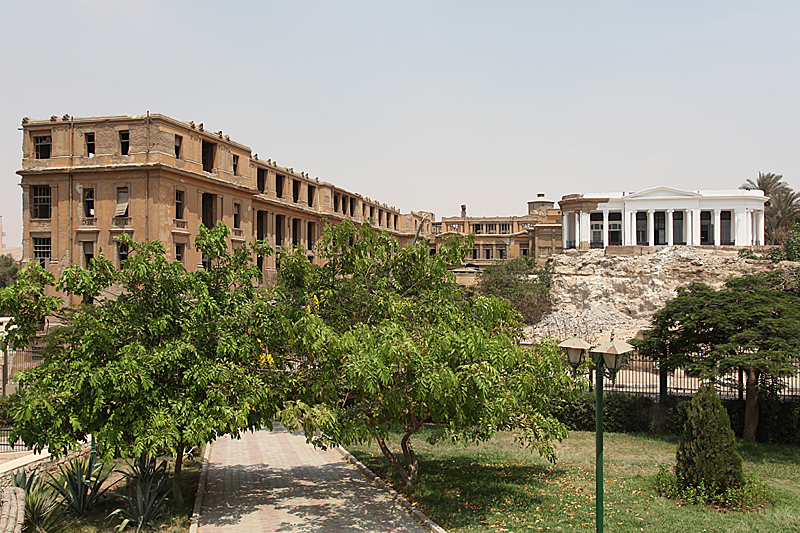
- Farouk's palace

- Location in Egypt
- Coordinates: 29°50′43″N 31°20′00″E
- Country: Egypt
- Governorate: Cairo
- First settled: Mid 6th Millennium BCE

Area
  - Total: 25 sq mi (65 km^{2})

Population (2017)
  - Total: 521,239
- Time zone: UTC+2 (EET)
  - Summer (DST): UTC+3 (EEST)

Helwan (Arabic: حلوان Ḥelwān, IPA: [ħelˈwæːn], Coptic: ϩⲁⲗⲟⲩⲁⲛ, romanized: Halwan) is a suburban district in the southern part of Cairo, Egypt, directly opposite the ruins of Memphis. The area of Helwan witnessed prehistoric, ancient Egyptian, Roman and Muslim era activity, and is one of the oldest continually inhabited cities, with inhabitation beginning in the mid 6th millennium BCE.

More recently, Helwan was designated as a city until the 1960s, before it became contiguous with the city of Cairo and was incorporated as a district. For a brief period between April 2008 and April 2011 it was redesignated as a city, and served as the capital of the now defunct Helwan Governorate that was split from Cairo and Giza governorates, before being re-incorporated back into them. The kism of Helwan had a population of 557,620 in the 2023 census.

Helwan is among the largest suburbs of Cairo by area, and is located in the far south. The city is located south of Al-Tabbin, to the north by El Masara district, and to the east by 15th of May. The Nile River is located west of the city. Helwan University's campus is located in the Ain Helwan area. Helwan is Cairo's largest industrial center, with factories producing iron and steel, cement, and military equipment, as well as the Nasr Automotive Factory, the Sigwart Factory in Maasara, and the Egyptian Company for the Manufacture of Telephone Equipment (Quick Tel) in Maasara. The area is the site of the world's oldest dam, Sadd el-Kafara, and was the traditional birthplace of Moses.

== Etymology ==
The origin of Helwan's name is not definitively known. The most widely accepted theory is that 'Helwan' is derived from the original name Ain-an (lit: "Spring of the Fish"), named for the therapeutic spring baths located in the area, which were considered holy by the Ancient Egyptians. This name was then attested as Hor-Ain-Anne in 700 BCE before gradually evolving to Hey-wan, then Halouan, then Helwan, the modern name of the city.

According to Ali Mubarak's Tawfiq plans, the name "Helwan" was said to be one of several places named after Halwan ibn Imran ibn al-Haf ibn Quda'ah. Mubarak described it as a village east of the Nile, about two leagues from Fustat.

Yaqut al-Hamawi's Mu'jam al-Buldan and al-Maqrizi's Khitat instead attribute the name to Halwan ibn Amr ibn Imru' al-Qais, a king of Egypt descended from Qahtan, who is said to have commanded part of Abraha's army in the Levant. By this account, the settlement, once called Ma'murah, has existed for about 1,358 years.

Another theory is that the city was named by Abd Al Aziz ibn Marwan, who named it after Hulwan in Iran due to their similar climate, instead attributing a Kurdish, Persian or Syriac Aramaic origin to the name.

The area was also given many other names, such as Ma'murah, Goshen and Shahran.

== History ==
=== Pre-Historic Era ===
Main Page: see Helwan retouch

The Helwan and Isnian cultures of the late Epipalaeolithic (10000BC), and their Ouchata retouch methods for creating microlithic tools may have contributed to the development of the Harifian cultural assemblage of the Sinai, which may have introduced Proto-Semitic languages into the Middle East.

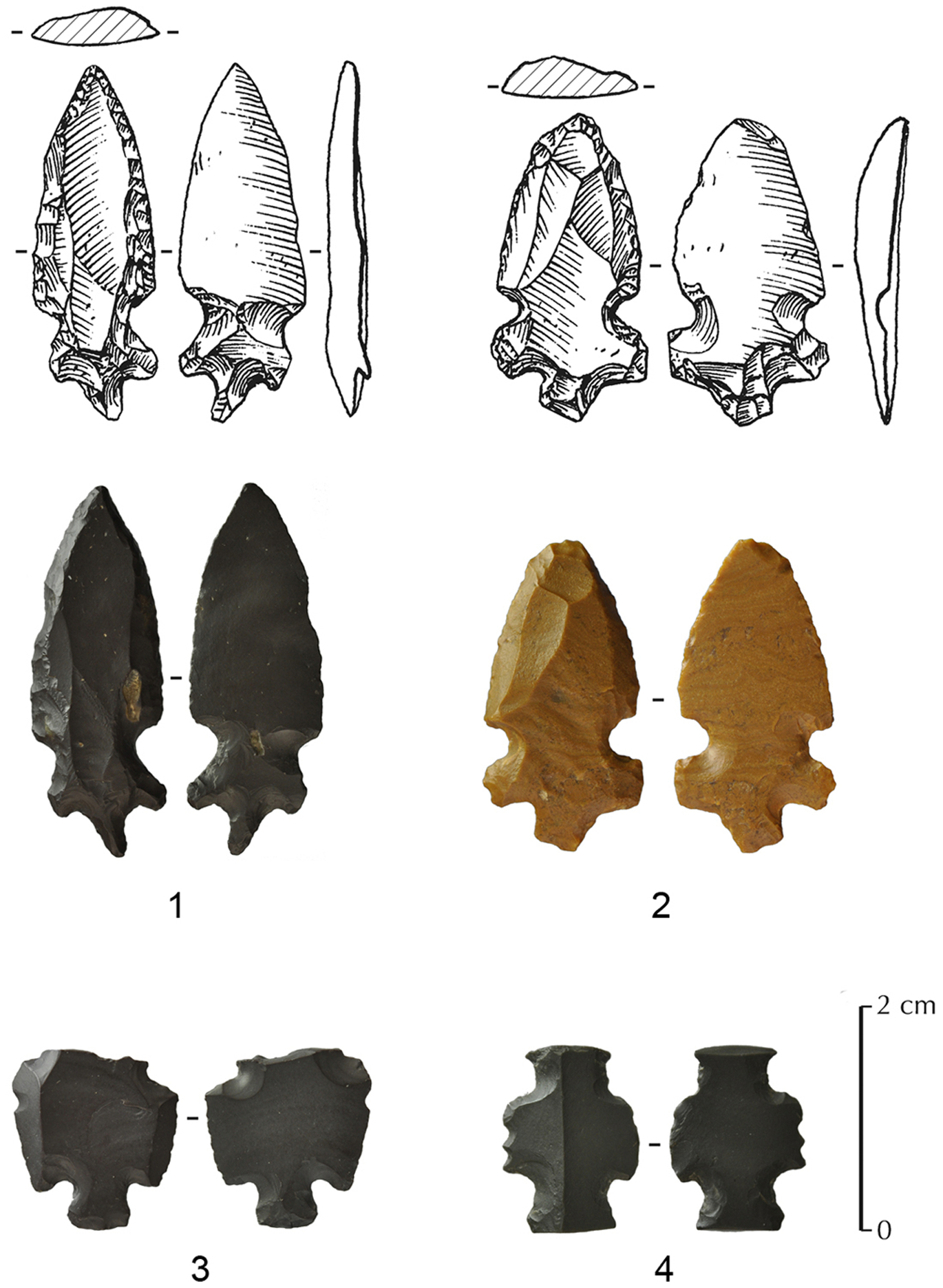
Helwan points (Abu Salem points sub-type)

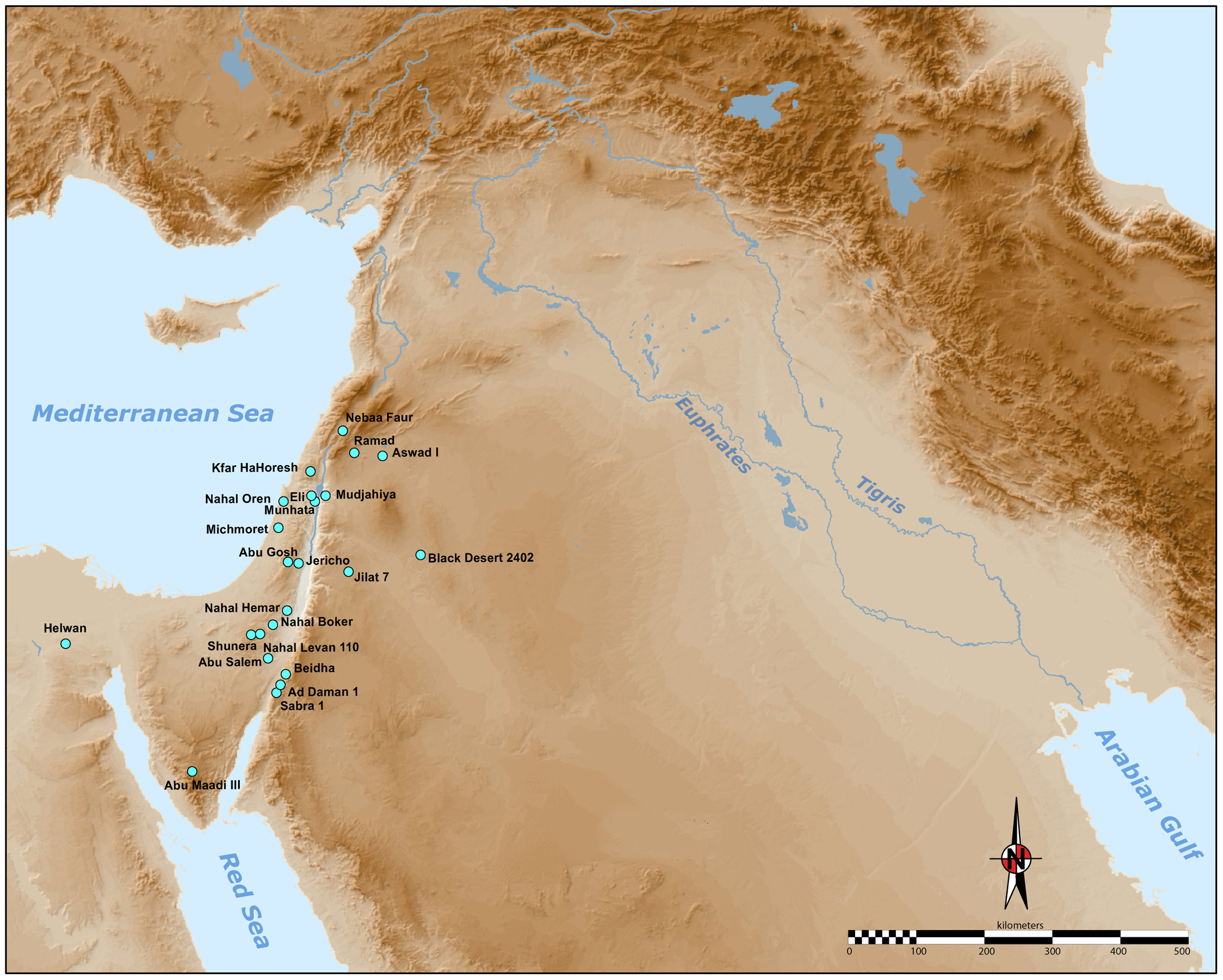
Map of the Levantine sites with Helwan points

=== Pre-Dynastic Era ===
Initial inhabitation of Helwan began in 5300BC, with the emergence of the El Omari Culture in the Wadi Hof Region, introducing one of the first instances of permanent agricultural settlement in the Nile Delta. Its location safe from the Nile Floods made it one of the earliest settlements in not only Egypt, but Africa as a whole.

Helwan then became contemporary with the Buto-Maadi Culture found in Maadi, just north of the town, at around 4000BC.

=== Ancient Egyptian Era ===
Around 3300 to 2600 BC, there was a cemetery near Helwan serving the city of Memphis. Some of the earliest evidence of writing stems from the tombs found in Helwan.

The Predynastic King Ni-Neith was buried in Helwan around 3230BCE.

Helwan was incorporated into the Inebu-Hedj Nome of Ancient Egypt, making it part of the first ever country subdivision.

The Predynastic queen Neithhotep, the earliest attested woman in history, was mentioned on a label in Helwan cemetery.

The Sadd el Kafara Dam was built in Wadi Hof, Helwan in 2600BCE, making it the oldest major dam in history.

Helwan contains the tombs of Khnemetptah, Nysuheqat and Sitba, and also attests Ka, Narmer and Meriiti.

The cemetery was used the most during the Middle Kingdom.

The district of El Masara in Helwan has been historically identified as Goshen, the land where Moses was born. If Moses had lived during the 15th century BCE, Helwan would be a likely candidate for the birthplace of Moses. Furthermore, Coptic and later Islamic tradition identify the land as the birthplace of Moses.

=== Roman Era ===
In the Coptic era, Christians and Jews inhabited the area and built monasteries, churches, and synagogues. Foreigners, especially Greeks and Italians, also lived in Helwan, spreading Roman orthodox and Catholic churches in the area.

Helwan's springs were mentioned on the Rosetta Stone.

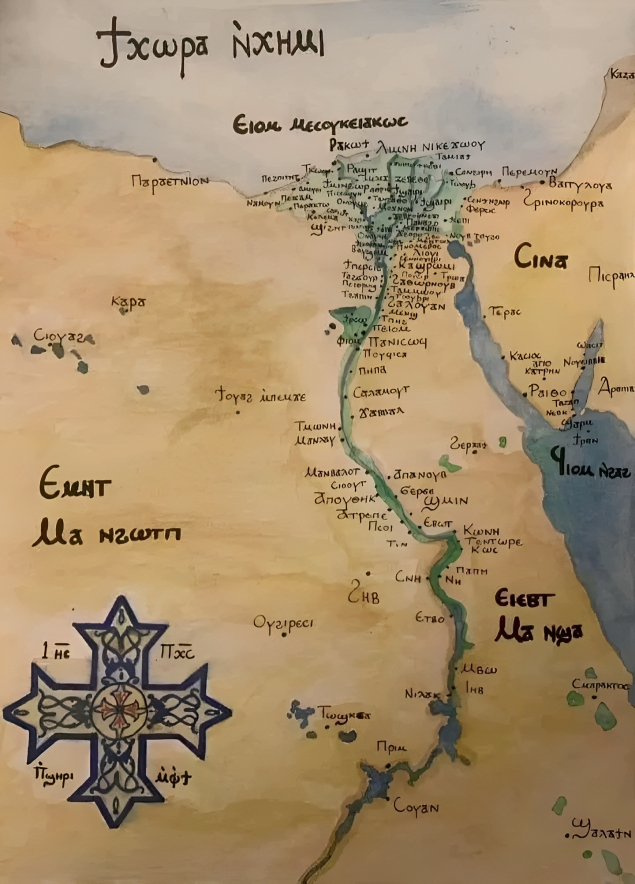
Map of Egypt, Including Helwan, during the Coptic Era

Helwan has been identified with the City of Alphocranon.

Alphocranon was important enough in the Late Roman province of Arcadia Aegypti to be a suffragan of its Metropolitan Archbishop of Oxyrhynchus.

Its bishop, Harpocration, participated in the First Council of Nicaea in 325. The bishopric is mentioned in two Notitiae Episcopatuum. No longer a residential diocese, Alphocranon is today listed by the Catholic Church as a Latin Catholic titular bishopric, nominally restoring the diocese since 1933, but no incumbent is recorded.

=== Islamic Era ===
Due to a plague in the capital Fustat, Helwan was made the temporary substitute capital of Umayyad Egypt in 689 CE by its governor Abd al-Aziz ibn Marwan, who died in the new city.

=== Modern history ===
After a period of Ottoman decline, the area was revitalised under Abbas Helmy Pasha, when its therapeutic springs were re-discovered.

In 1849, a professor at the Cairo School of Medicine promoted the health benefits of sulfur springs, and the government of Khedive Abbas I sent soldiers to exploit the sulfur springs at Helwan. The experiment was reported a success, and a wooden tank and two small rooms were built there, which drew large numbers of Egyptian visitors and some European visitors.

In 1868, Ismail, the Khedive of Egypt, sent a scientific committee to study the springs and ordered the Public Works Department to build a bathhouse. While laying the foundation, workers found a circular basin about eight meters in diameter built of 25-centimeter red brick lined with limestone along with broken columns, bases, and capitals. The basin has been identified with a bathhouse described by Al-Maqrizi. Facilities eventually included baths for Europeans, a private bath for the Khedive, and fourteen public baths, along with a 40-room hotel first called the Grand Hotel and later the Grand Baths Hotel.

Helwan became the capital of Egypt under Tawfiq Pasha, who later died in the city. Cairo and Helwan were connected by railway and by the Nile. Trains ran every half hour from Bab al-Louq station until 1909.

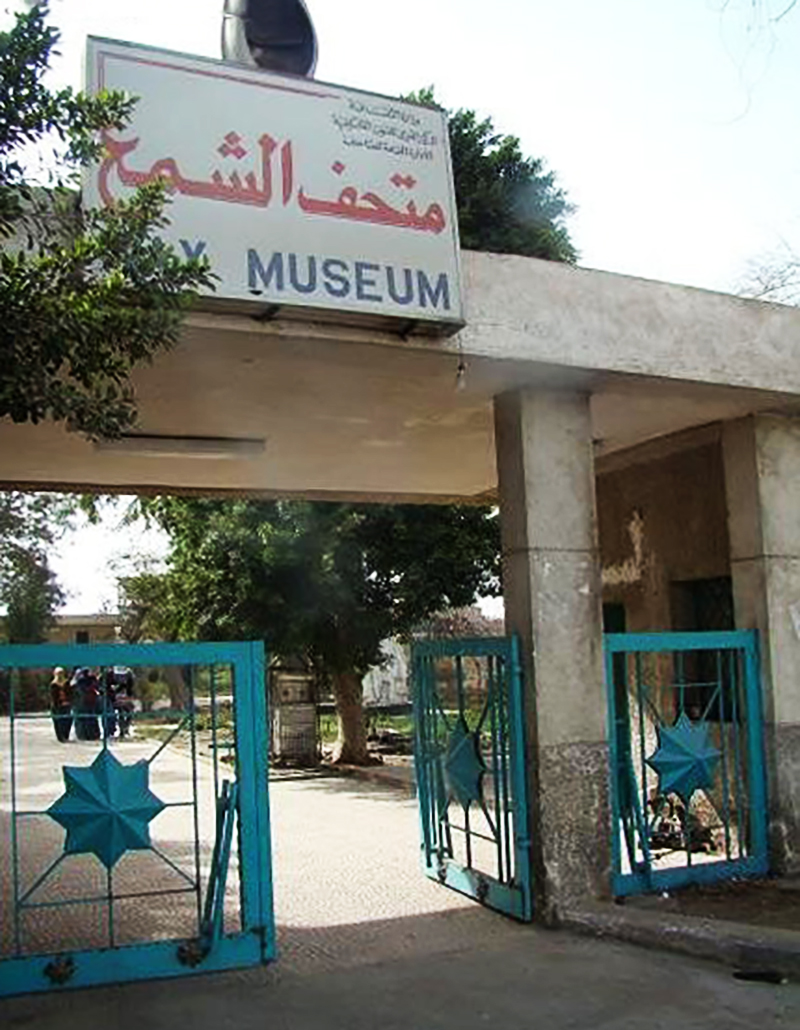
Helwan wax museum

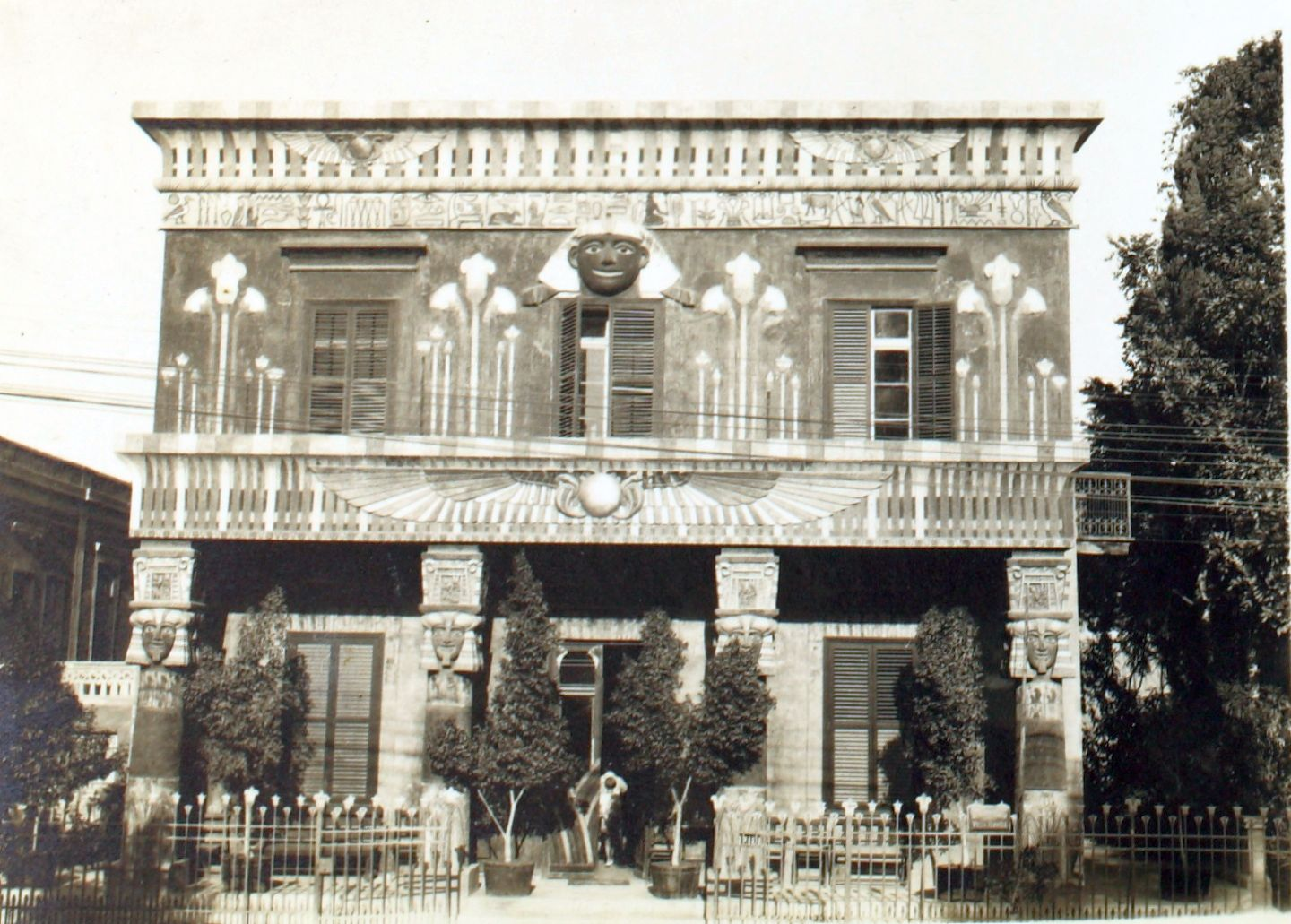
Helwan Egypt Villa Wanda

The Khedivial Astronomical Observatory was built here in 1903–1904, and was used to observe Halley's Comet. Zulfiqar Pasha built the Japanese Garden between 1917 and 1920. A natural spring emerged in 1939, and the Helwan wax museum, founded in Cairo by Fouad Abdel Malek in 1934, was relocated near it. Egypt's oldest and largest private psychiatric clinic, the Behman Hospital, was constructed here in 1939.

During the early part of the 20th century, the city was the site of RAF Helwan, a major British airfield, which was later used by the Egyptian Air Force.

After the 1952 revolution, Helwan shifted from a health resort to an industrial center, and many of its buildings and palaces were later demolished. In 1959, Helwan was chosen to serve as a site of a major industrial city, as part of President Gamal Abdel Nasser's attempts to industrialize Egypt. Throughout the 1960s, it developed into a massive steelworks zone, with numerous automobile factories being built. The site continues to use electricity from the Aswan Dam and iron ore from Egypt's western deserts. Helwan was gradually transformed into a mass suburb of Cairo for the working class.

=== Helwan Governorate ===
In April 2008, the Helwan Governorate was split from the Cairo Governorate, encompassing most of the districts outside the ring road, as well as all satellite cities (15th May, New Cairo, Shorouk, Badr, and Huckstep) and the undeveloped desert. Helwan was elevated to city status, incorporating the districts of al-Ma'sara, 'Ain Helwan (qism Helwan), and al-Mustaqbal (prev. 15 May), and became the capital of the new governorate. Maadi was also elevated to city status, incorporating the districts of Maadi, Tora, al-Tibin and al-Nahda. Helwan Governorate later incorporated the rural counties (marakiz, sing. markaz) of Al-Saf and Atfih from the Giza Governorate's former jurisdiction east of the Nile.

Following the dissolution of the Helwan Governorate in April 2011, all cities and districts returned to their previous statuses, and the city of Helwan was reincorporated as a district.

== Administrative subdivisions and population ==
In the 2017 census, Helwan had 521,239 residents in 8 shiakhas (census blocks):

| Shiakha | Code 2017 | Population |
|---|---|---|
| `Ayn Ḥulwân | 010208 | 34800 |
| Kafr al-`Uluw | 010207 | 73561 |
| Masâkin al-Iqtiṣâdiyya, al- | 010201 | 98831 |
| Ḥulwân al-balad | 010203 | 106302 |
| Ḥulwân al-baḥriyya | 010202 | 13328 |
| Ḥulwân al-gharbiyya | 010205 | 44775 |
| Ḥulwân al-qibliyya | 010206 | 15384 |
| Ḥulwân al-sharqiyya | 010204 | 134258 |

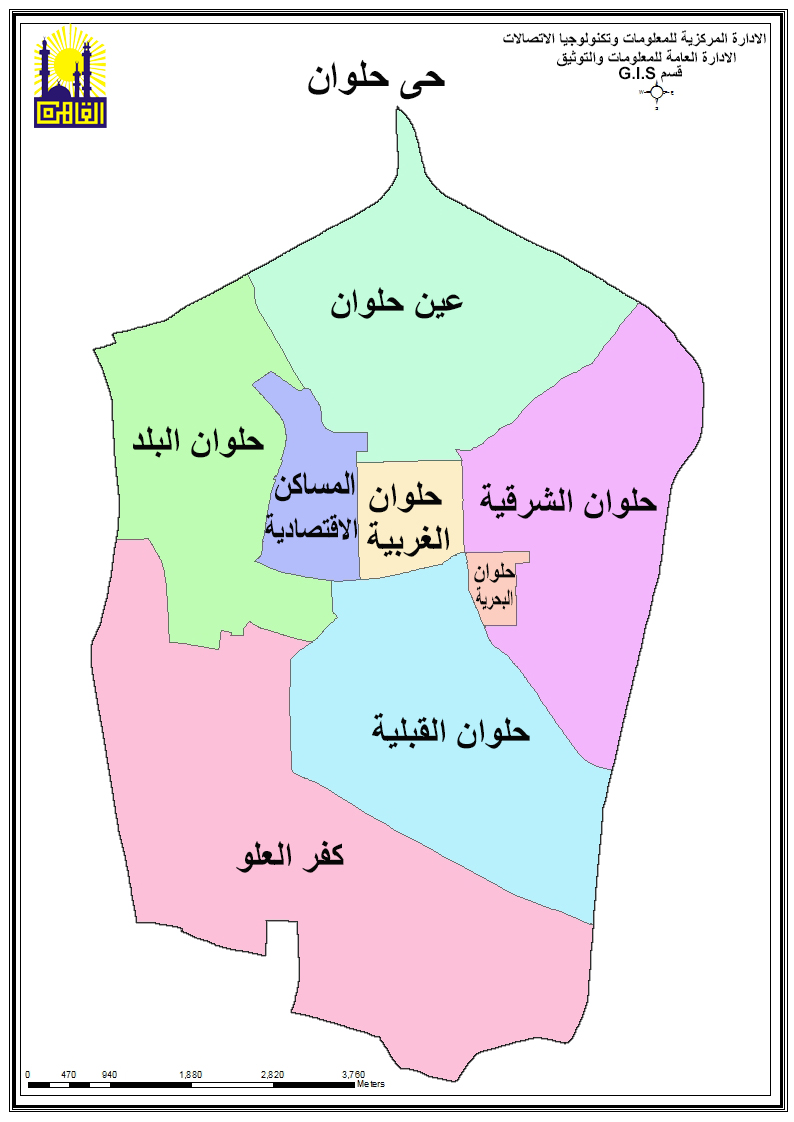
Map of Helwan district

== Economy ==
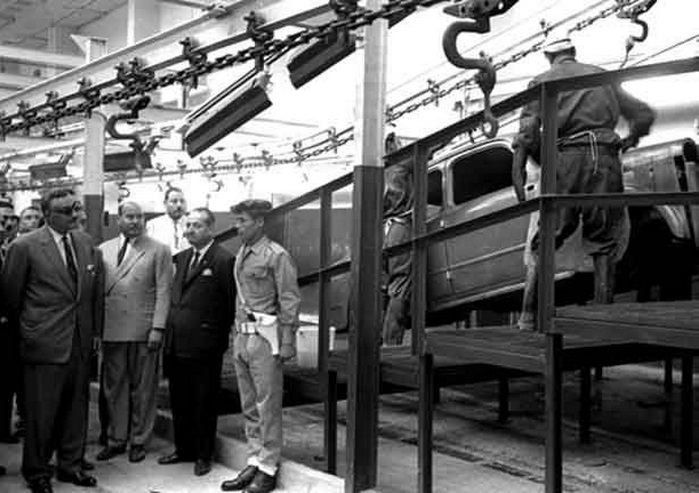
President Gamal Abdel Nasser inaugurating the Al Nasr automobile factory in Helwan, 1963

Local industry includes iron, steel, textiles and cement. The area has hot sulphur springs, an astronomical observatory, Helwan University and a burial chamber (discovered in 1946). It is the southern terminus of Cairo's light rail Metro Line 1. Also trams in Helwan used to serve the people.

== Climate ==
Köppen-Geiger climate classification system classifies its climate as hot desert (BWh). Owing to its proximity to Cairo, its average monthly temperatures are quite similar, but it has a quite different distribution of humidity and its diurnal average temperature variation is slightly larger.

Climate data for Helwan
| Month | Jan | Feb | Mar | Apr | May | Jun | Jul | Aug | Sep | Oct | Nov | Dec | Year |
|---|---|---|---|---|---|---|---|---|---|---|---|---|---|
| Record high °C (°F) | 30.4 (86.7) | 33.2 (91.8) | 37.2 (99.0) | 42.4 (108.3) | 46.6 (115.9) | 47.4 (117.3) | 44.1 (111.4) | 43.8 (110.8) | 44.0 (111.2) | 40.2 (104.4) | 35.9 (96.6) | 29.8 (85.6) | 47.4 (117.3) |
| Mean daily maximum °C (°F) | 18.5 (65.3) | 20.4 (68.7) | 23.4 (74.1) | 28.5 (83.3) | 32.2 (90.0) | 34.3 (93.7) | 35.0 (95.0) | 34.6 (94.3) | 32.6 (90.7) | 29.3 (84.7) | 24.5 (76.1) | 19.5 (67.1) | 27.7 (81.9) |
| Daily mean °C (°F) | 13.0 (55.4) | 14.5 (58.1) | 16.9 (62.4) | 21.4 (70.5) | 24.7 (76.5) | 27.3 (81.1) | 27.7 (81.9) | 27.6 (81.7) | 25.8 (78.4) | 23.3 (73.9) | 18.8 (65.8) | 14.4 (57.9) | 21.3 (70.3) |
| Mean daily minimum °C (°F) | 7.9 (46.2) | 8.9 (48.0) | 10.9 (51.6) | 14.3 (57.7) | 17.3 (63.1) | 19.9 (67.8) | 20.9 (69.6) | 21.1 (70.0) | 19.8 (67.6) | 17.6 (63.7) | 13.7 (56.7) | 9.8 (49.6) | 15.2 (59.4) |
| Record low °C (°F) | −3.4 (25.9) | 2.2 (36.0) | 1.2 (34.2) | 6.6 (43.9) | 10.6 (51.1) | 13.8 (56.8) | 15.0 (59.0) | 11.2 (52.2) | 14.4 (57.9) | 10.8 (51.4) | 3.7 (38.7) | 2.8 (37.0) | −3.4 (25.9) |
| Average precipitation mm (inches) | 5 (0.2) | 3 (0.1) | 2 (0.1) | 1 (0.0) | 0 (0) | 0 (0) | 0 (0) | 0 (0) | 0 (0) | 0 (0) | 2 (0.1) | 5 (0.2) | 18 (0.7) |
| Average precipitation days (≥ 1.0 mm) | 1.0 | 0.3 | 0.3 | 0.2 | 0.0 | 0.0 | 0.0 | 0.0 | 0.0 | 0.0 | 0.2 | 0.5 | 2.5 |
| Average relative humidity (%) | 62 | 57 | 54 | 43 | 41 | 45 | 52 | 56 | 56 | 55 | 58 | 61 | 53 |
| Mean monthly sunshine hours | 220.8 | 211.7 | 266.3 | 275.8 | 314.6 | 357.5 | 350.2 | 337.8 | 282.7 | 289.6 | 244.1 | 197.1 | 3,348.2 |
Source: NOAA

== Notable people ==
- Harold Knox-Shaw, one of the earliest astronomy specialists in Helwan Observatory.
- John Reynolds, one of the earliest astronomy specialists in Helwan Observatory and president of the English Royal Astronomical Society between 1935 and 1937.
- Tewfik Pasha, King of Egypt, died in his palace at Helwan.
- Lucie, Lady Duff-Gordon, writer, died in Helwan
- Ahmed Ahmed, actor and comedian
- Khadr El-Touni, Olympic gold medalist in weightlifting
- Abdul Rahman Hassan Azzam, diplomat, lived in Helwan.
- Moataz Eno, footballer
- Ibrahim Hassan and Hossam Hassan, footballers and coaches for the Egyptian National team.
- Umar ibn Abd al-Aziz, Ummayad Caliph
- Gamal El-Ghitani, writer, born in Helwan
- Dina Abdel Aziz, member of the Egyptian House of Representatives for the Helwan district in the 2016 Parliament.
- Saleh Pasha Sobhi, one of the oldest residents of Helwan in the early 19th century, who has a main street named after him.

== See also ==
- Helwan retouch
- Helwan University
- El Tebbin
- Helwan 300
- Helwan wax museum
