= Cairo Governorate =

Governorate in Egypt

Coordinates: 30°02′N 31°13′E

- Governorate
- Flag

- Cairo Governorate on the map of Egypt
- Country: Egypt
- Capital: Cairo

Government
  - Governor: Ibrahim Saber

Area
  - Total: 3,085 km^{2} (1,191 sq mi)

Population (January 2023)
  - Total: 10,203,693
  - Density: 3,308/km^{2} (8,566/sq mi)

GDP/GDP per Capita
  - Total: EGP 6,665 billion (US$ 142 billion) 13,653 $ (per capita)
- Time zone: UTC+2 (EGY)
  - Summer (DST): UTC+3 (EEST)
- ISO 3166 code: EG-C
- HDI (2021): 0.779 high · 4th
- Website: Cairo Governorate Portal

Cairo (Arabic: محافظة القاهرة) is one of the 27 governorates of Egypt. It consists of the city of Cairo, both the capital city of Egypt and the governorate capital, in addition to six satellite cities: The New Capital, which became the official seat of national government in April 2024, New Cairo, a suburban satellite city built in the 2000s, El Shorouk, Badr, Capital Gardens, and 15th of May. These cities form almost half of the Greater Cairo metropolitan area by population.

Cairo is one of four city governorates in Egypt, and the governor of Cairo is also the head of the city. Nonetheless, the governate of Cairo and the city of Cairo are two semi-distinct levels of local government, and as with other governorates, the governor is appointed by the president.

== Overview ==
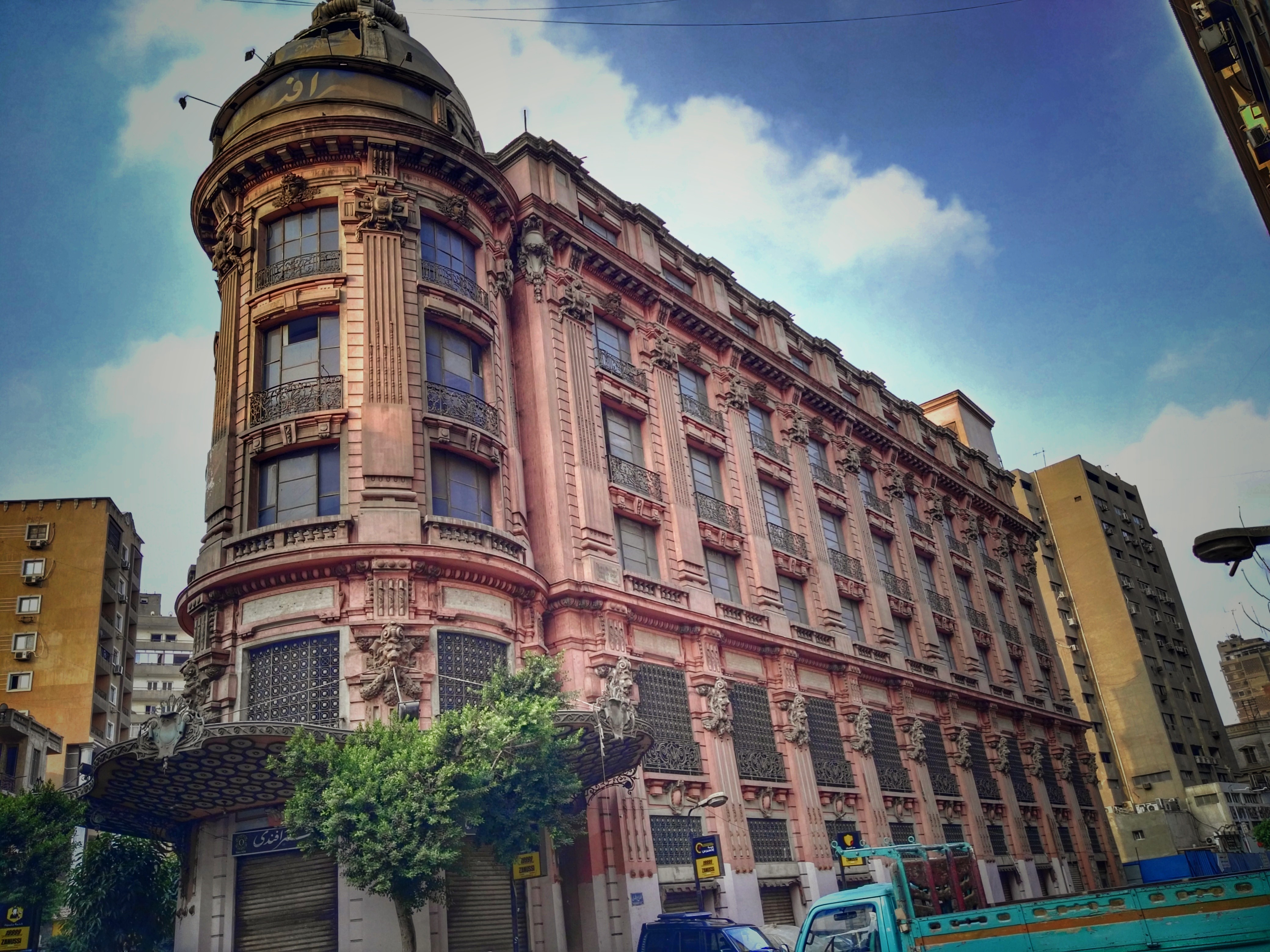
Omar Effendi building (built 1856), Downtown Cairo, Cairo

Parts of the governorate, the Helwan district and the satellite cities, were spun off in April 2008 to form the Helwan Governorate, only to be reincorporated into the Cairo Governorate in April 2011.

== Municipal divisions ==
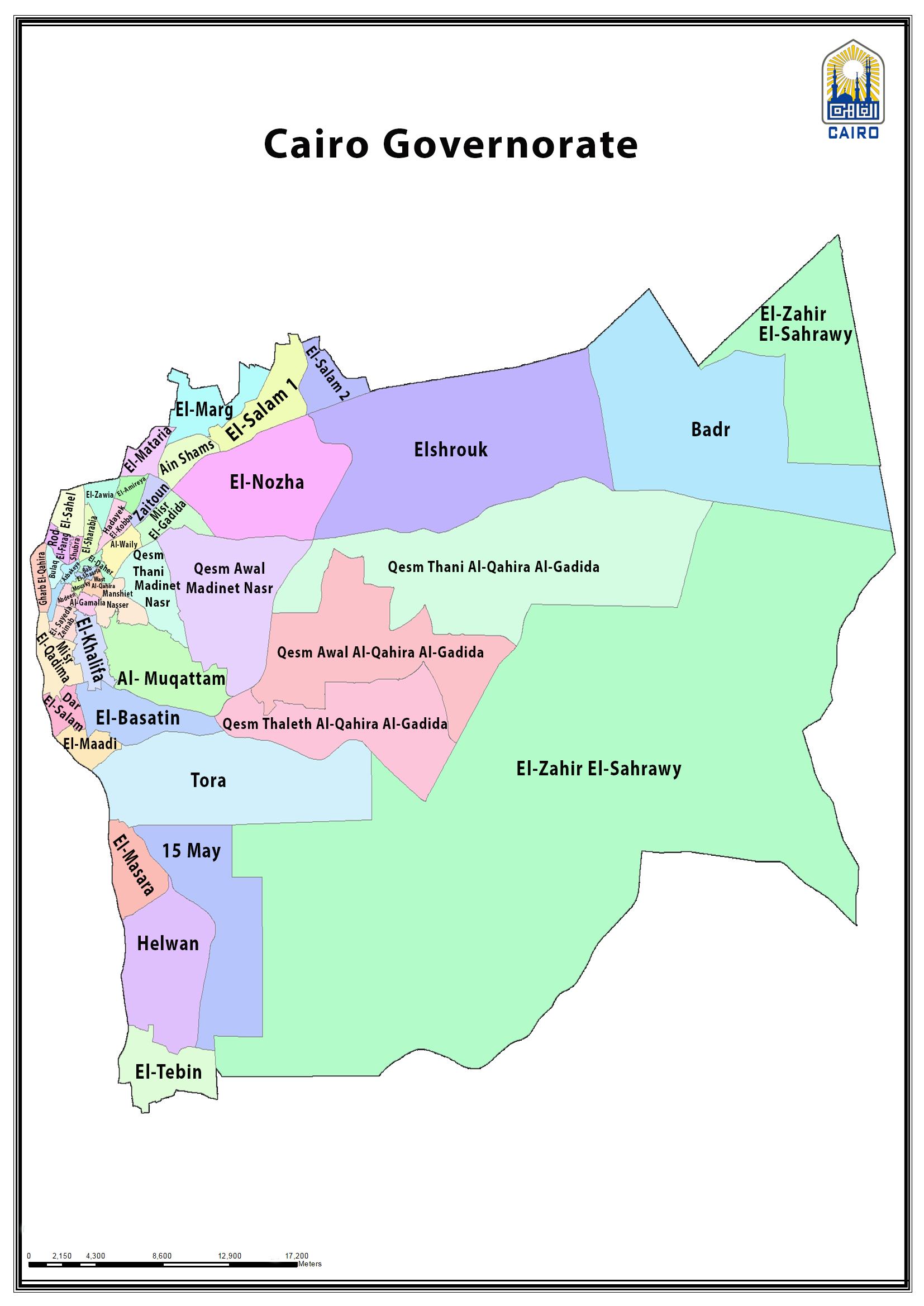

The governorate is divided into the city of Cairo, and the unallocated desert hinter land (al-zahir al-sahrawi).

Cairo city is subdivided into four Areas (manatiq) headed by a deputy governor each, and 38 Districts (ahya, sing. Hayy) with their own governor appointed heads.

The Northern Area divided into 9 Districts:

Shubra, Al-Zawiya al-Hamra, Hadayek al-Kobba, Rod al-Farg, al-Sharabiya, al-Sahel, al-Zaytoun, Al-Amiriya, and al-Waili

The Eastern Area divided into 9 Districts:

Misr al-Gadidah (Heliopolis), Al-Nozha, Nasr City East (Sharq Madinet Nasr), Nasr City West (Gharb Madinet Nasr), al-Salam Awwal, al-Salam Thani, al-Matariya, and al-Marg. In addition to New Cairo, Al-Shorouk, Badr, and The New Capital.

The Western Area divided into 9 Districts:

Manshiyat Nasser, Al-Wayli, Wasat al-Qahira: Al-Darb al-Ahmar, al-Gamaliyya, al-Hussein), Boulaq, Gharb El-Qahira (Zamalek, Garden City, Down Town), Abdeen, Azbakeya, al-Muski, and Bab El-Shaaria.

The Southern Area divided into 12 Districts:

Masr El-Qadima (Old Cairo), al-Khalifa, al-Moqattam, al-Basatin, Dar El-Salam, El-Sayeda Zeinab, al-Tebbin, Helwan, al-Ma'sara, al-Maadi, Tora, and 15th may City.

In addition to Cairo City, there are six satellite cities that are under the jurisdiction of the Minister of Housing, Utilities and Urban Communities who chairs the New Urban Communities Authority that directly controls them (planning, land sales, zoning), while the governorate departments (muduriyat) control police and select public services (education, health, subsidised food). The more populated ones are subdivided into hayy, while the ones still under construction are yet to have governorate representation. These cities are:

- New Cairo
- El Shorouk
- Badr
- 15th of May
- The New Capital
- Capital Gardens

As of January 2023, the municipal divisions had a total estimated population as of 10,203,693.

District Subdivisions (Hayy)
Anglicized name	Native name	Arabic transliteration	Population (January 2023 Est.)
1st Settlement	التجمع الأول ثان القاهرة	'Al Tagmou Al Khames Than Al Qahira	96,996
El Shorouk	الشروق	'El Shorouk	94,582
5th Settlement	التجمع الخامس أول القاهرة	'Al Tagmou Al Khames Aoal Al Qahira	145,286
15 May City	15 مايو	15 Māyū	100,074
Abdeen	عابدين	'Ābidīn	40,450
El Darb El Ahmar	الدرب الأحمر	Al-Darb Al-Aḥmar	62,563
Al Qatamia	القطامية ثالث القاهرة الجديدة	Al Qatamia Thalth Al Qahira Al Jadida	75,810
Ain Shams	عين شمس	'Ain Schams	657,226
Amreya	الاميريه	Al-Amīriīah	163,206
Azbakeya	الأزبكية	Al-Azbakiyah	21,148
El Basatin	البساتين	Al-Basātīn	529,875
El Gamaliya	الجمالية	Al-Jamāliyah	38,908
El Khalifa	الخليفة	Al-Khalīfah	112,568
Maadi	المعادي	Al-Ma'ādī	94,777
El Marg	المرج	Al-Marj	854,284
El Masara	المعصره	Al-Ma'ṣarah	288,880
El Matareya	المطرية	Al-Maṭariyah	644,436
El Mokattam	المقطم	Al-Muqaṭṭam	239,750
El Muski	الموسكي	Al-Mūskī	16,715
New Cairo 1	أول القاهرة الجديدة	Al-Qāhirah al-Jadīdah 1	136,271

== Population ==
Historical population
Year	Pop.	±%
1937	1,312,096	—
1947	2,090,654	+59.3%
1957	2,877,195	+37.6%
1966	4,220,000	+46.7%
1976	5,084,463	+20.5%
1986	6,052,836	+19.0%
1996	6,800,991	+12.4%
2006	7,902,085	+16.2%
2014	9,102,232	+15.2%
2018	9,655,000	+6.1%
2023	10,203,693	+5.7%

== Governors ==
As of 4 April 2025, Ibrahim Saber is the governor of Cairo Governorate.

=== Former ===
- Atef Abdelhamid, 7 September 2016 - 12 August 2018
- Galal Mostafa Saeed, 13 August 2013 - 23 March 2016
- Osama Kamal, 29 January 2013 - 12 August 2013
- Abdel Kawi Khalifa, 14 April 2011 - 12 August 2012
- Abdel Azim Wazir, 9 July 2004 - 14 April 2011
- Abdel Rehim Shehata, 8 July 1997 - 14 July 2004
- Mohammed Omar Abdel Akhar, 2 May 1991 - 7 July 1997
- Mahmoud Sherif, 18 April 1989 - 19 May 1991
- Yousef Sabri Abu Taleb, 13 March 1983 - 14 April 1989
- Mohammed Saad El-Din Maamoun, 15 May 1977 - 12 March 1983

== Industrial zones ==
According to the Governing Authority for Investment and Free Zones (GAFI), the following industrial zones are located in Cairo:

Zone name
15 May Industrial Zone
Badr City Industrial Zone
El Maasara Industrial Zone
El Marg District Industrial Zones
El Robeky Industrial Zone
El Sharabiya District Industrial Zones
Katameya Industrial Zone
New Cairo Industrial Zone
Shaq El Thoban Industrial Zone
South Helwan Industrial Zone
Torah Industrial Zone

== See also ==
- Governorates of Egypt
- Greater Cairo
- List of governors of Cairo Governorate
- Helwan Governorate
- The New Capital
- Economic regions of egypt
