= Harifian culture =

Epipaleolithic culture in Negev, Israel

Harifian
- Geographical range: Negev Desert
- Period: Epipalaeolithic
- Dates: 8,800 BCE – 7,000 BCE
- Preceded by: Natufian culture
- Followed by: Khiamian culture

Harifian is a specialized regional cultural development of the Epipalaeolithic of the Negev Desert, in the southern part of the Levant, named after Mount Harif. It corresponds to the latest stages of the Natufian culture, and represents a culmination of the local Natufian developments.

== History ==
Like the Natufian, Harifian is characterized by semi-subterranean houses. These are often more elaborate than those found at Natufian sites. For the first time arrowheads are found among the stone tool kit.

The Harifian dates to between approximately 10,800/10,500 BP and 10,000/10,200 BP. It is restricted to the Sinai Peninsula and Negev, and is probably broadly contemporary with the Late Natufian or Pre-Pottery Neolithic A (PPNA), although archeological chronology has shown it seems to have occurred during the transition from the Natufian to the PPNA.

Microlithic points are a characteristic feature of the industry, with the Harif point being both new and particularly diagnostic – Bar-Yosef (1998) suggests that it is an indication of improved hunting techniques. Lunates, isosceles and other triangular forms were backed with retouch, and some Helwan lunates are found. This industry contrasts with the Desert Natufian which did not have the roughly triangular points in its assemblage.

There are two main groups within the Harifian. One group consists of ephemeral base camps in the north of Sinai and western Negev, where stone points comprise up to 88% of all microliths, accompanied by only a few lunates and triangles. The other group consists of base camps and smaller campsites in the Negev and features a greater number of lunates and triangles than points. These sites probably represent functional rather than chronological differences. The presence of Khiam points in some sites indicates that there was communication with other areas in the Levant at this time."

== See also ==
- Archeology of Palestine
- Archaeology of Israel
