= Abdul Azim Wazir =

Egyptian politician and academic (1945–2015)

Abdul Azim Wazir was the governor of Cairo in Egypt, and he was governor of Damietta Governorate, he is a professor of criminal law and the former dean of the Faculty of Law Mansoura University.

Abdel Azim Wazir was born on June 26, 1945 in Beni Suef Governorate. He obtained a law degree in 1966 from the Faculty of Law, Ain Shams University. He then obtained a postgraduate diploma in public law in 1967 from the Faculty of Law, Cairo University, followed by a postgraduate diploma in criminal sciences in 1968 from the same university. He then completed the requirements for a doctorate in criminal law in 1979 from Mansoura University.
