= 6th of October Governorate =

Former governorate of Egypt

Coordinates: 29°56′17″N 30°54′50″E

6th of October Governorate محافظة السادس من أكتوبر
- 17th April 2008–14th April 2011
- Location of the 6th of October Governorate within Egypt
- Capital: 6th of October
- History
  - Established: 17th April 2008
  - Disestablished: 14th April 2011
- Today part of: Giza Governorate

The 6th of October Governorate (Arabic: محافظة السادس من أكتوبر) was one of the governorates of Egypt. It was located in Middle Egypt, to the west of the Nile valley in the Western Desert. It was dissolved on 14 April 2011 and was reincorporated into the Giza Governorate.

== History ==
The 6th of October Governorate was split from the Giza Governorate on 17 April 2008. It was created through a presidential decree in order to ease the burden placed on Giza, one of Egypt's most densely populated governorates. 6th of October City was the capital of the 6th of October Governorate, which was mostly made up of recently established planned communities administered by the New Urban Communities Authority such as Sheikh Zayed. On 14 April 2011, following the 2011 Egyptian revolution, Prime Minister Essam Sharaf dissolved the 6th of October Governorate and reincorporated its territory into the Giza Governorate.

The governorate name commemorates the Egyptian military's successful crossing of the Suez Canal on 6 October 1973 during the October War. 6th of October is also Egypt's Armed Forces Day.

== Geography ==
The area of the 6th of October Governorate consisted primarily of desert, but contains the left bank of the Nile valley to both the north and south of Giza, and the important oasis town of Bahariya. It was traversed by the north-easterly line of equal latitude and longitude, a line where the northern latitude and eastern longitude are the same.

== Cities ==
- 6th of October City
- Sheikh Zayed
- Kerdasa
- Badrashin
- Al-Rehab

== See also ==
- Giza Governorate
- Helwan Governorate (now defunct)
