= Helwan Governorate =

Former governorate of Egypt

Coordinates: 29°51′N 31°20′E

Helwan Governorate محافظة حلوان
- Capital: Helwan
- Demonym: Helwani
- Today part of: Cairo Governorate; Giza Governorate

Location of the now defunct Helwan Governorate within Egypt

Helwan Governorate (Arabic: محافظة حلوان) was one of the governorates of Egypt. It was located in Lower Egypt.

== History ==
The Helwan Governorate was split from the Cairo Governorate in April 2008. It was created through a presidential decree in order to ease the burden placed on Cairo, one of Egypt's most densely populated governorates. The city of Helwan became the capital of the Helwan Governorate, which encompassed most of the eastern suburbs of Cairo, notably the affluent neighbourhood of Maadi. In April 2011, Prime Minister Essam Sharaf abolished the Helwan Governorate and reincorporated its territory into the Cairo Governorate.

== Cities ==
- Helwan
- New Cairo (present-day location of the city is on what was the governorate)

== See also ==
- Cairo Governorate
- 6th of October Governorate (now defunct)
