= Cairo Festival City Mall =

Center in New Cairo, Egypt

Cairo Festival City Mall is a large-scale shopping and entertainment center located in New Cairo, Egypt. It serves as the primary retail component of the Cairo Festival City, a 3-million-square-meter mixed-use development by the Al-Futtaim Real Estate.

== History ==
Cairo Festival City Mall was opened on November 26, 2013. Upon its opening, it became the largest retail center in New Cairo and also home to the first IKEA store in Egypt. In 2024, JD Sports, illy Cafe, and Furla opened its first store in Egypt at Cairo Festival City Mall.

== Facilities ==
Cairo Festival City Mall dining area occupies 20,000 m^{2} and comprises 81 restaurants and cafes. The food and beverage offerings include international chains such as Illy Café and Amorino. Entertainment facilities within the mall include a 20-screen cinema, KidZania Cairo, Magic Planet arcade, and Bounce trampoline park. The mall also has an outdoor section called The Village.
