= Fifth Settlement =

District of New Cairo, Egypt

Coordinates: 30°00′17″N 31°26′03″E

The Fifth Settlement (Arabic: التجمع الخامس, literally means "the Fifth Gathering"; commonly shortened to: التجمع et-Tagammoʿ pronounced [et.tæˈɡæm.moʕ]) is a section of the New Cairo satellite city, in the Eastern Area of Cairo Governorate, Egypt. It is in the قسم, qism (police ward) Al-Qahira al-Gadida Awwal, or New Cairo 1. The Fifth Settlement was originally one of five standalone human settlements (satellite cities) built by the New Urban Communities Authority in the 1980s in the desert east of the Cairo Ring Road, to absorb the working class population growth. In 2000, the Fifth Settlement, along with the nearby First and Third Settlements, were incorporated as New Cairo. In 2023, it had 145,286 residents.

Today, it is one of the more affluent neighbourhoods of Cairo, with several upscale compounds and luxury districts including Gharb El Golf, El Shouifat, the Diplomats Compound, El Narges, North Investors, and South Investors. The main street is Share' El Tes'een or 90 St. It serves as the central axis of the city of New Cairo and contain the financial, administrative and commercial centers that serve the city and Greater Cairo as a whole. It is one of the fastest-growing areas in Egypt in terms of construction.

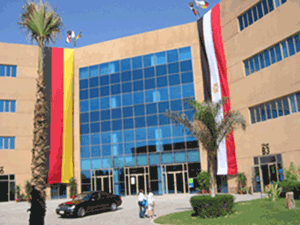
The German University in Cairo, one of several university campuses in New Cairo.

== Quarters and population ==
Al-Qahira al-Gadida Awwal had a population of 135,834 according to the 2017 census, across its four شياخات, shiyakhat (quarters):

Shiakha	Code 2017	Population
Gâmi`a al-Amrîkiyya (American University in Cairo), and al-Rawḍa, al-	014204	451
Nargis, and al-Mustathmirîn al-ganûbiyya, al-	014202	15175
Tajammu` 5, al-	014201	36830
Yâsamîn et al.-Banafsig, and al-Mustathmirîn al-shamâliyya, al-	014203	83378

== Trivia ==
Beginning on 5 March 2011, the criminal court of the Fifth Settlement was the venue of the trial of former Interior Minister Habib el-Adly for corruption, specifically money laundering and embezzlement of public funds.

Shopping areas in Fifth Settlement include Cairo Festival City Mall, Downtown Katameya and Concord Plaza.

== See also ==
- El Rehab
- New Cairo
- El Shorouk
- Greater Cairo
