= Ring Road (Cairo) =

Road in Cairo, Egypt

Cairo Ring Road

Location
- Country: Egypt

Highway system
- Transport in Egypt

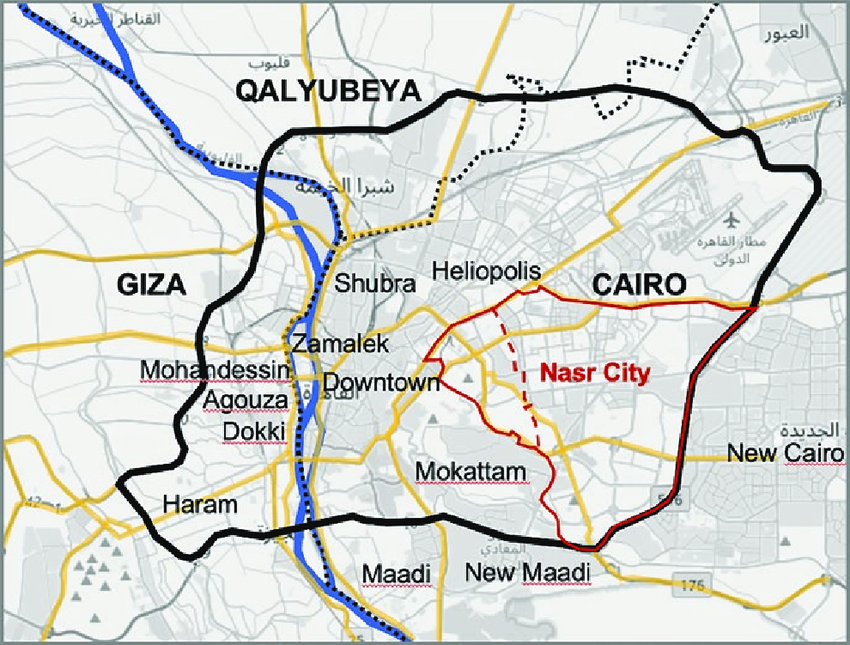
The Cairo Ring Road Map, showing Cairo as a major city

The Cairo Ring Road is a 100km long ring road that encircles most of the contiguous metropolitan area of the cities of Cairo, Giza and Shubra Al-Kheima, in the Greater Cairo region in Egypt.

Construction began in the late 1980s. It was originally planned to surround the Greater Cairo region from three of its four sides, but part of the road remains unbuilt because the original route took it very near the Giza pyramids, an area which has been on the UNESCO's World Heritage List since 1979. It had two purposes: stopping the urbanization of arable lands, and reducing Cairo's traffic.

In the early 2000s, planning for a regional ring road commenced, enclosing the larger metropolitan area including El Shorouk, New Cairo and Helwan in the Cairo Governorate, Obour in the Qalyubiyya Governorate and 6th of October in the Giza Governorate, which was completed in 2018.

== History ==
There were three master plans for the urban development of Cairo, in 1956, 1970 and 1983. The Ring Road first appeared in the second plan as a beltway encompassing the eastern (Cairo) sector of the Greater Cairo region, and linking all the 16 administrative regions that the plan created. In the third master plan, approved in 1984 under the government of Hosni Mubarak and in collaboration with France, it appeared as a 73 km (45 mi) long beltway. It would connect the new 16 administrative regions of the city and would isolate them from the rural areas.

It was left unfinished due to part of the road passing too near the Pyramids of Giza (see other section in this article). The Egyptian government planned to close it by building a road over the Marioteya waterway.

== Purpose ==
Ring Road had the main purpose of stopping the urbanization of arable lands by creating a barrier around the Greater Cairo region. It was unsuccessful, with the urbanization tripling in amount and the remaining arable land inside the perimeter being to all effects condemned to urbanization. There were also negative effects, like settlements being cut in two parts, with the outer part getting isolated. It also helped rich people create luxury urbanizations outside of the main city nucleus, following the example of American cities like Los Angeles and straying away from the European model of compact cities.

A secondary purpose was to reduce the traffic inside the city.

== Giza controversy ==
Ring Road's original route in 1984 took it very near the Giza pyramids, an area which has been on the UNESCO's World Heritage List since 1979. In 1994, The Independent alerted the world that the construction was probably destroying ancient burial sites since no proper controls were made. Also, it would pass by the South of the Giza plateau, isolating it from the open desert by surrounding it with roads on its four sides and bringing enormous urbanistical pressure. The UNESCO pressured the Egyptian government, causing in 1995 the halting of the construction of that part of the road. A UNESCO committee recommended in 1995 to by follow the Mariutiya Canal or the El Mansuriya Canal, thus passing the road North of the plateau. In 2002 there were discussions about building an underpass or a tunnel.

== Other ==
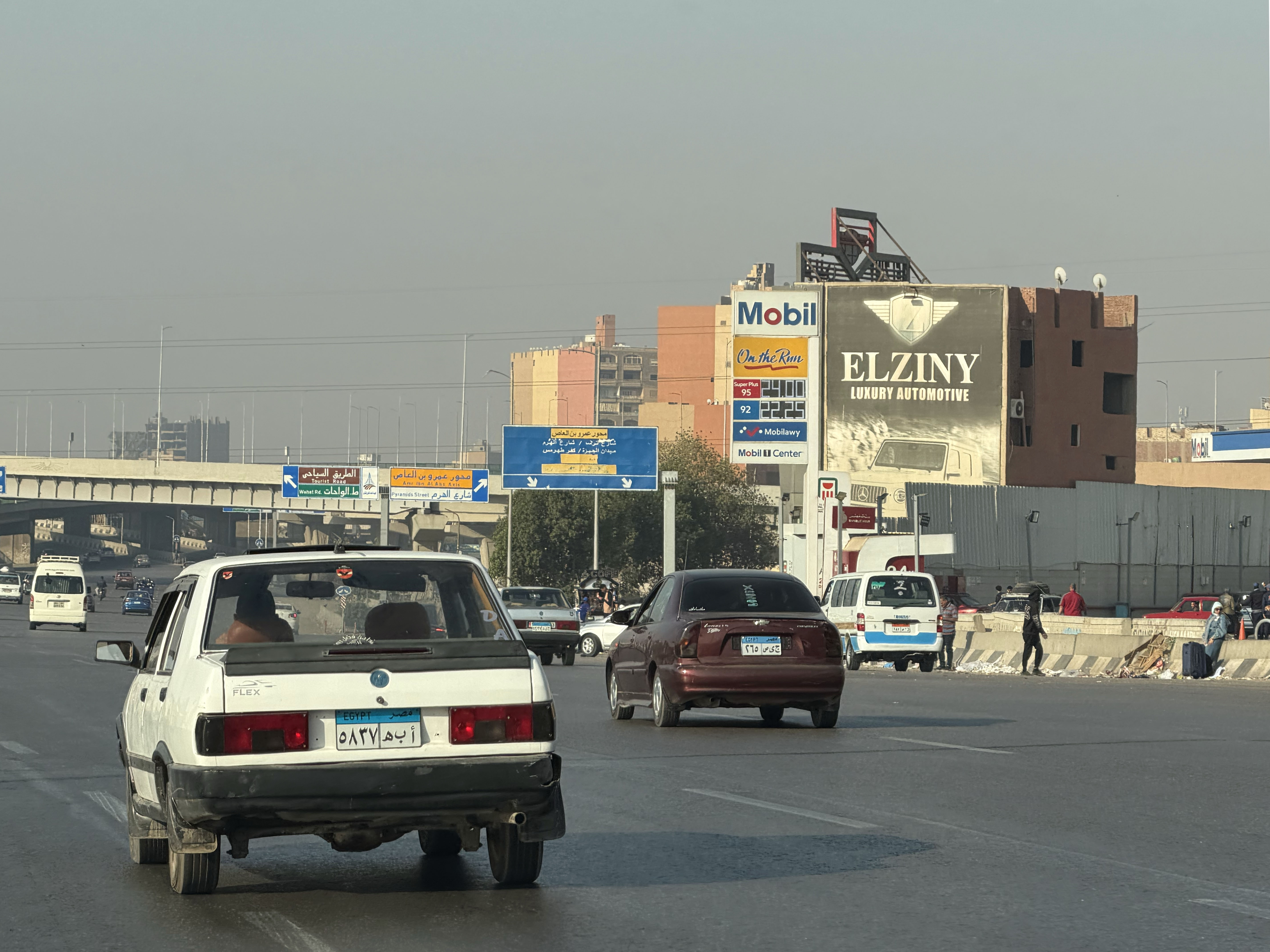
Southbound traffic on the ring road in Giza

The total length of the ring road in 2001 was about 72 km (45 mi) with more than 50% on desert land, 15% in urbanized area, and 35% on arable land. The highway has eight lanes. The total budget for the project was E£3 billion.

The ring road connects to the Cairo–Alexandria highway, near the pyramids at Giza.

Second and third ring roads have been proposed for Cairo.

In 2010, a report commissioned by the World Bank and the government of Egypt found that the city was still severely congestioned, and identified many problematic spots, many of them on the Ring Road.

In 2013, The Cairo Post said that lack of public transport, bad design and lack of maintenance have caused the road to be congested and a "death trap" for drivers. For example, the entries and exits are too narrow, they are in bad state, they transition too abruptly from sandy roads, they are in bad state or covered with sand, there are too few of them and people have to travel long distances through bad roads to reach the nearest entry. It's a problem for pedestrians because there are no sideways, no pedestrian crossings, no pedestrian bridges, and no protected sideways for people who are waiting for public transportation.

== See also ==
- Trans-African Highway network
