= Amr Soliman =

Egyptian architect and businessman

- Occupations: architect, businessman
- Title: founder and Executive Chairman of Mountain View for development and real estate investment

Amr Ismail Soliman (Arabic: عمرو إسماعيل سليمان) is an Egyptian architect and businessman, and the founder and Executive Chairman of Mountain View for development and real estate investment Company, and serves on the Prime Minister's Advisory Committee for Urban Development and Real Estate Export.

== Career ==
In 1989, Amr Soliman founded Dar Al-Maamar Architecture and Interior Design Group (DMG). In 2005, he founded Mountain View Real Estate Development and Investment Company, an Egyptian joint-stock company specializing in real estate investment and development, and ranked among the top five real estate companies in Egypt.

Mountain View initially developed small residential communities and compounds before expanding into large-scale integrated city developments. It owns 23 residential communities in Egypt, located in East and West Cairo, as well as projects along the Red Sea and Mediterranean coasts. In 2024, the company began operations in Saudi Arabia through the establishment of Mountain View Saudi Arabia.

Soliman is the First Deputy Chairman of the Real Estate Development Division at the Egyptian Chamber of Commerce, Board Member of the Real Estate Development Industry Chamber at the Federation of Egyptian Industries, and a member of Prime Minister Mostafa Madbouly's Advisory Committee for Urban Development and Real Estate Export.

== Community engagement ==
Soliman is a founder and active partner in several charitable organizations, including the Mountain View Development Foundation, the Egyptian Food Bank, and Terous Misr Foundation.

In 2017, Soliman co-founded the Real Estate Development Academy in partnership with the American University in Cairo and the National University of Singapore, and serves on the Academy's graduation project judging panels.

== Recognitions ==
In March 2021, Soliman was recognized at the fourth edition of the BT100 Awards for his work in real estate. In 2024 and 2025, Forbes Middle East named him among the Middle East's Most Impactful Real Estate Leaders.
