= HICIT in Shorouk Academy =

Private university in El Shorouk City, Egypt

The Higher Institute of Computer Science & Information Technology
- المعهد العالي للحاسبات و تكنولوجيه المعلومات بلشروق
- Type: Private
- Established: June, 2004
- Chairman: Farouk Shabaan
- President: Ahmed Gaber
- Location: El Shorouk City, Cairo, Egypt
- Campus: Shorouk Academy
- Website: www.sha.edu.eg

The Higher Institute of Computer Science & Information Technology (Arabic: المعهد العالي للحاسبات و تكنولوجيه المعلومات بلشروق) in El Shorouk City is officially licensed by the Ministry of Higher Education and Scientific Research of the Arab Republic of Egypt. The Higher Institute of Computer & Information Technology in El Shorouk was granted its original accreditation according to the decree of the Supreme Council of Universities No. 79 on June 5, 2004.

== Academic study ==
=== Academic fields ===
- Data analytics
- Data warehousing
- Data mining
- Software engineering
- Cloud computing
- System analysis
- System design
- Management information systems
- Programming and SE development

=== Academic degrees ===
The Higher Institute of Computer Science provides the Egyptian bachelor's in computer science that is equal to the Egyptian bachelor's in computer science provided by Egyptian universities.

== Testing centers ==
=== Prometic testing center ===
In March 2008 an agreement between the institute and Prometric company was signed, giving the institute the right to start its own testing center providing all Microsoft exams as well as Sun and Apple exams.

=== ICDL testing center ===
In January 2010 an agreement was signed between the institute and UNESCO, giving the institute the right to start its own testing center providing the International ICDL and the Egyptian version of ICDL.

== Student activities ==
=== Microsoft student partners ===
==== 2011 MSPs ====
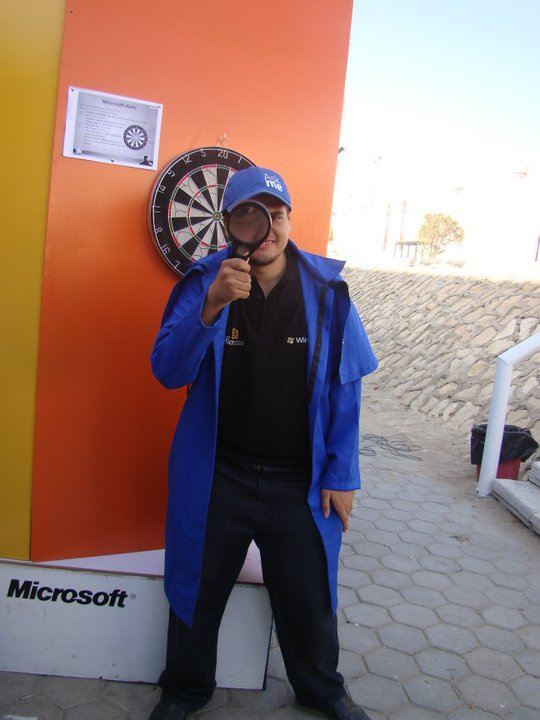
President Ahmed Fouad

== GDG Shorouk ==
Formerly known as Shorouk GTUG (Google Technology User Group) is the Google Developers Group at Shorouk Academy, founded in 2011 by the following students of HICIT:

- Ahmed Mahmoud
- Ahmed Farid
- Ashraf Hesham
- Nasser Ali
