= New Cairo Academy =

Coordinates: 29.9948°N 31.4354°E

New Cairo Academy (ET5)
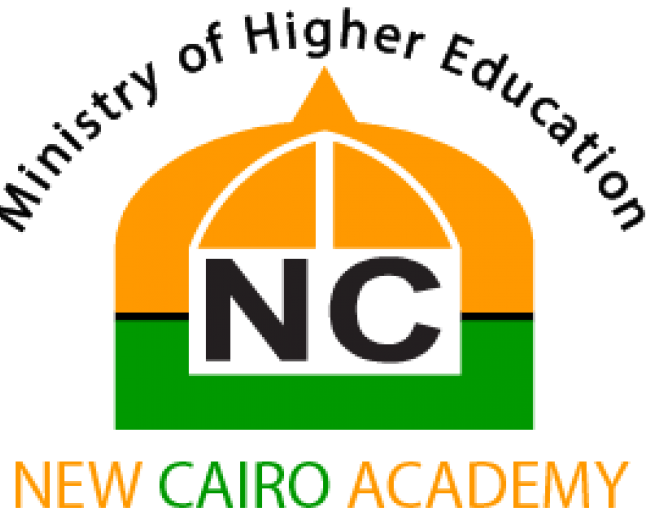
- Type: Private
- Established: 2001
- Location: Cairo, Egypt
- Website: www.et5.edu.eg www.fb.com/ET5.EDU

New Cairo Academy is one of the Egyptian private institutes that includes specialities of Engineering, Computer Science, Information technology, Commerce and applied arts. It is located in the 5th Settlement, a district of New Cairo, Egypt.

The Academy has applied the Regulations of the Supreme Council of Universities to grant students a bachelor's degree in any of the institute's speciality equivalence institutes to grant a bachelor's degree equivalent to Egyptian public state universities.

== Institutes ==
There are four educational institutes in New Cairo Academy:

=== Higher Institute of Engineering & Technology ===
- Electric Engineering Department
- Civil Engineering Department
- Architecture Engineering Department
- Electronics and Communications Engineering department

=== Higher Institute of Computer Science & Information Systems ===
- Computer Science Department
- Business Administration Department
- Administrative Information Systems Department

=== Higher Institute of Applied Arts ===
- Announcement Department
- Decoration Department
- Costume Design Department
- Interior Design & Furniture Department
- Printing, Publishing and Packaging Department
- Sculpture and architectural composition and Restoration Department
- Textile printing and dyeing and finishing Department
- Photography, Cinema & Television Department

=== Higher Institute of Administrative Science and Foreign Trade ===
- Business Administration Department
- Administrative Information Systems Department

== Reputation ==
New Cairo Academy is officially recognised as a higher education institution. As such, it has the right to award undergraduate degrees.
