= Future University in Egypt =

University in New Cairo, Egypt

Future University in Egypt جامعة المستقبل
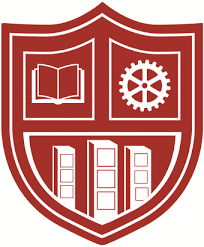
- Type: Private
- Established: 2006
- Chairman: Khaled Hassan Azazy
- President: Ebada Sarhan
- Address: End of 90th St., Fifth Settlement, New Cairo, Egypt; 30.02598°N 31.49110°E
- Website: fue.edu.eg

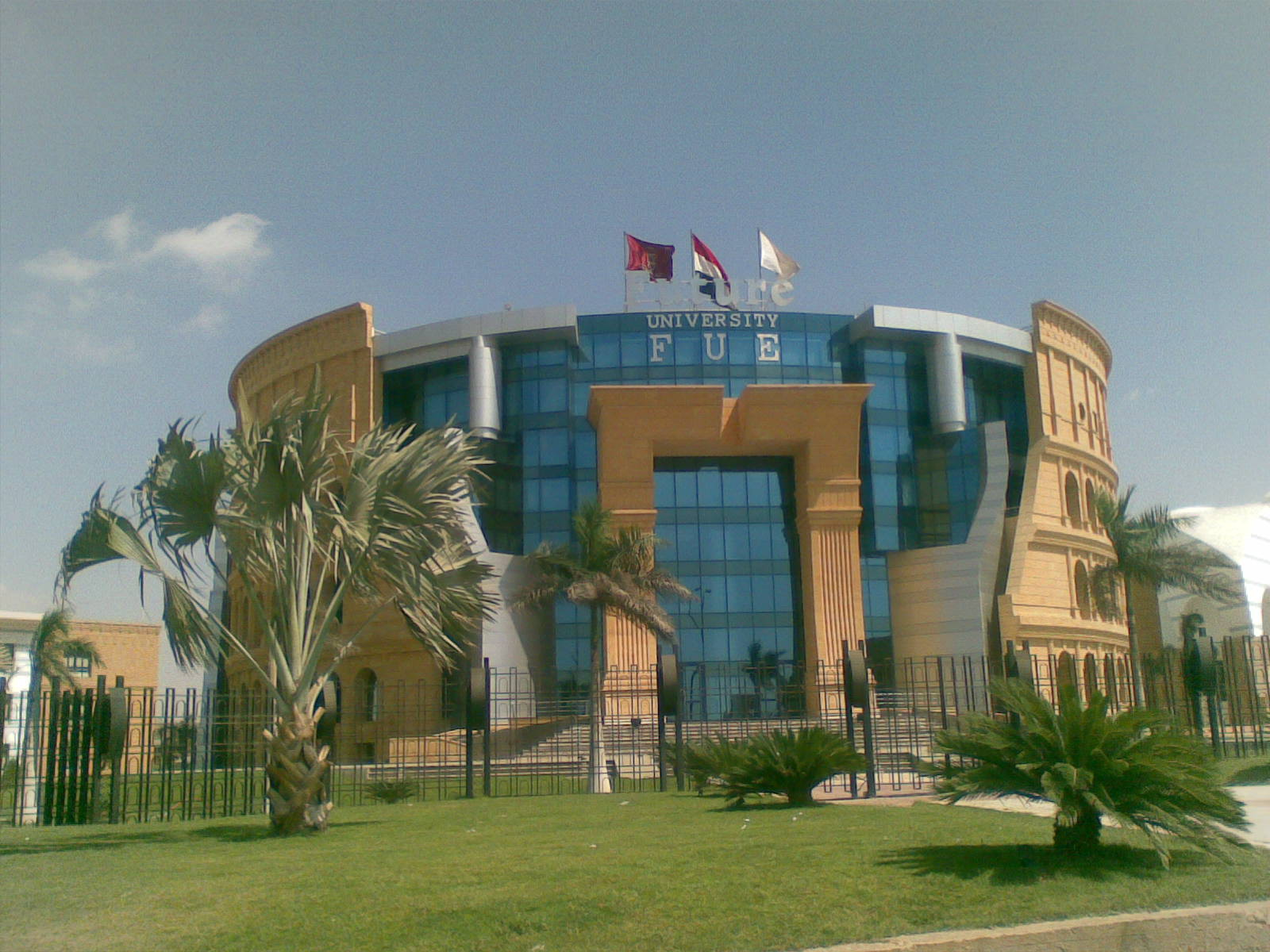
Administration building, Future University in Egypt - New Cairo, Egypt

Future University in Egypt (FUE; Arabic: جامعة المستقبل) is a private university located in 90 street, New Cairo, Egypt and was founded in 2006 by the Azazy Group.

== Faculties ==
- Faculty of Oral and Dental Medicine
- Faculty of Pharmaceutical Sciences and Pharmaceutical Industries
- Faculty of Engineering and Technology
- Faculty of Economics and Political Science
- Faculty of Commerce and Business Administration
- Faculty of Computers and Information Technology

Each faculty is an independent institution with its own property and equipment. The faculties are responsible for selecting students, in accordance with University regulations. Degrees are awarded by the university.

== Partnerships ==
=== Academic partnerships ===
The list includes academic cooperation agreements signed with other universities. Agreements could include faculty and student exchange, mutual accreditation of degrees, continuing education and certificate programs.

- University of Cincinnati
- University College Cork
- Missouri University of Science and Technology
- Nova Southeastern University
- University of Latvia, Faculty of Business, Economics and Management
- Louisiana State University
- University of Maryland
- University of Connecticut, School of Engineering
- Southern Illinois University
- Wright State University
- University of New Mexico
- Case Western Reserve University

=== Corporate partnerships ===
- Bavarian Auto Group
- ASEA Brown Boveri
- British Council
- Schneider Electric

== Key people ==
=== Board of trustees ===
- Jehan Sadat
- Farouk El-Baz
- Mostafa El-Sayed
- Hany Mahfouz Helal
- Ahmed Zaki Badr
- Hani Azer
- Farid El Tobgui

== Research practices allegations ==
A 2025 paper from the American University of Beirut listed Future University in a case study of schools using "questionable authorship practices" to manipulate research output metrics. The article noted the university had 977% increase in publications between 2019 and 2023, well above Egypt's national average of 71%, while its rate of first-authorship dropped and international collaborations rose 61 percentage points.

University rankings

Global – Overall
- QS World: 901-950 (2026)
