= Al Rehab =

Al Rehab مدينة الرحاب
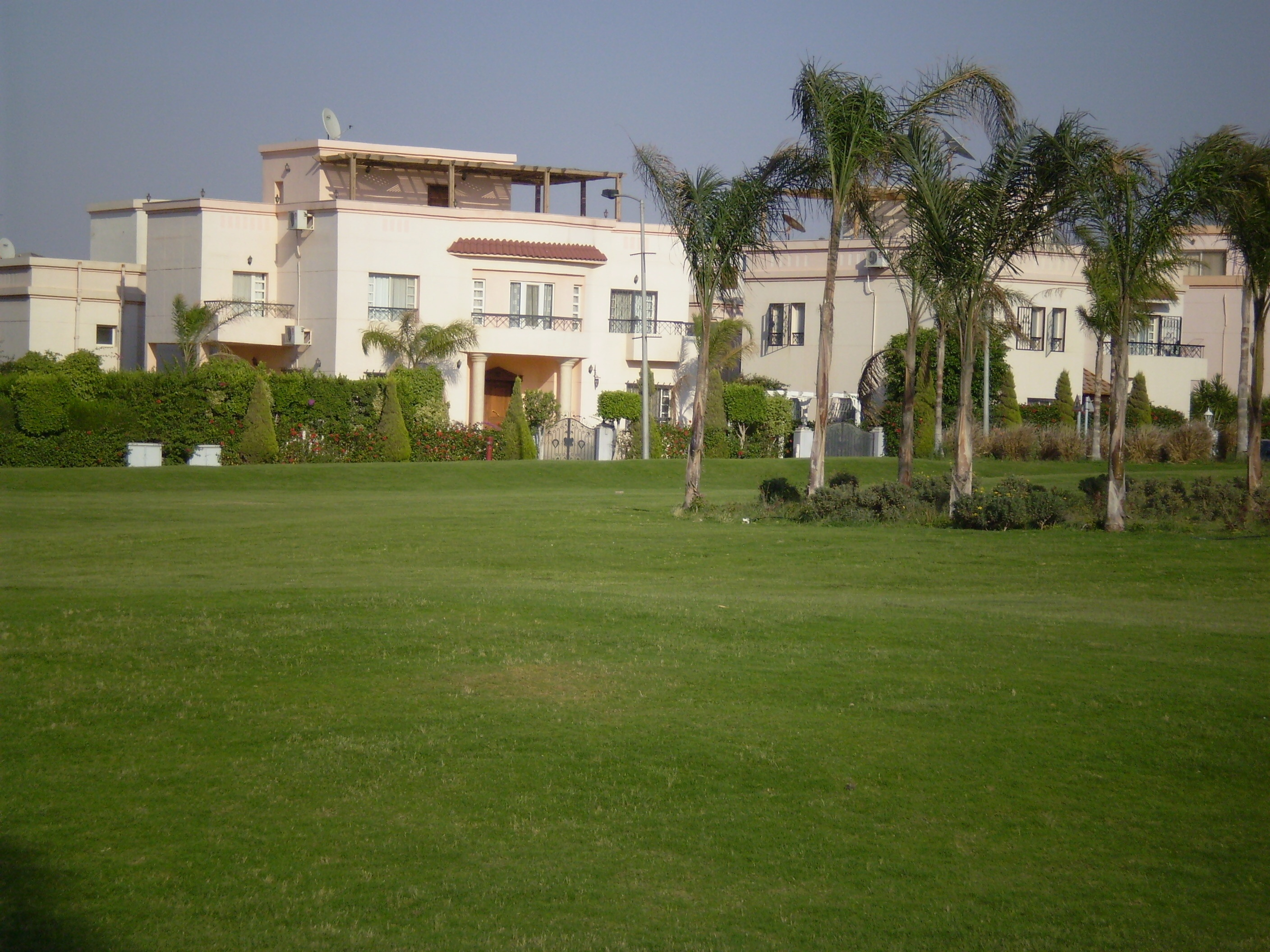
- Al Rehab City during the day (2007)

- Location in Egypt
- Coordinates: 30.066271°N 31.485601°E
- Country: Egypt
- Governorate: Cairo

Population (1 October 2018)
  - Total: 350,000
- estimate
- Time zone: UTC+2 (EET)
  - Summer (DST): UTC+3 (EEST)

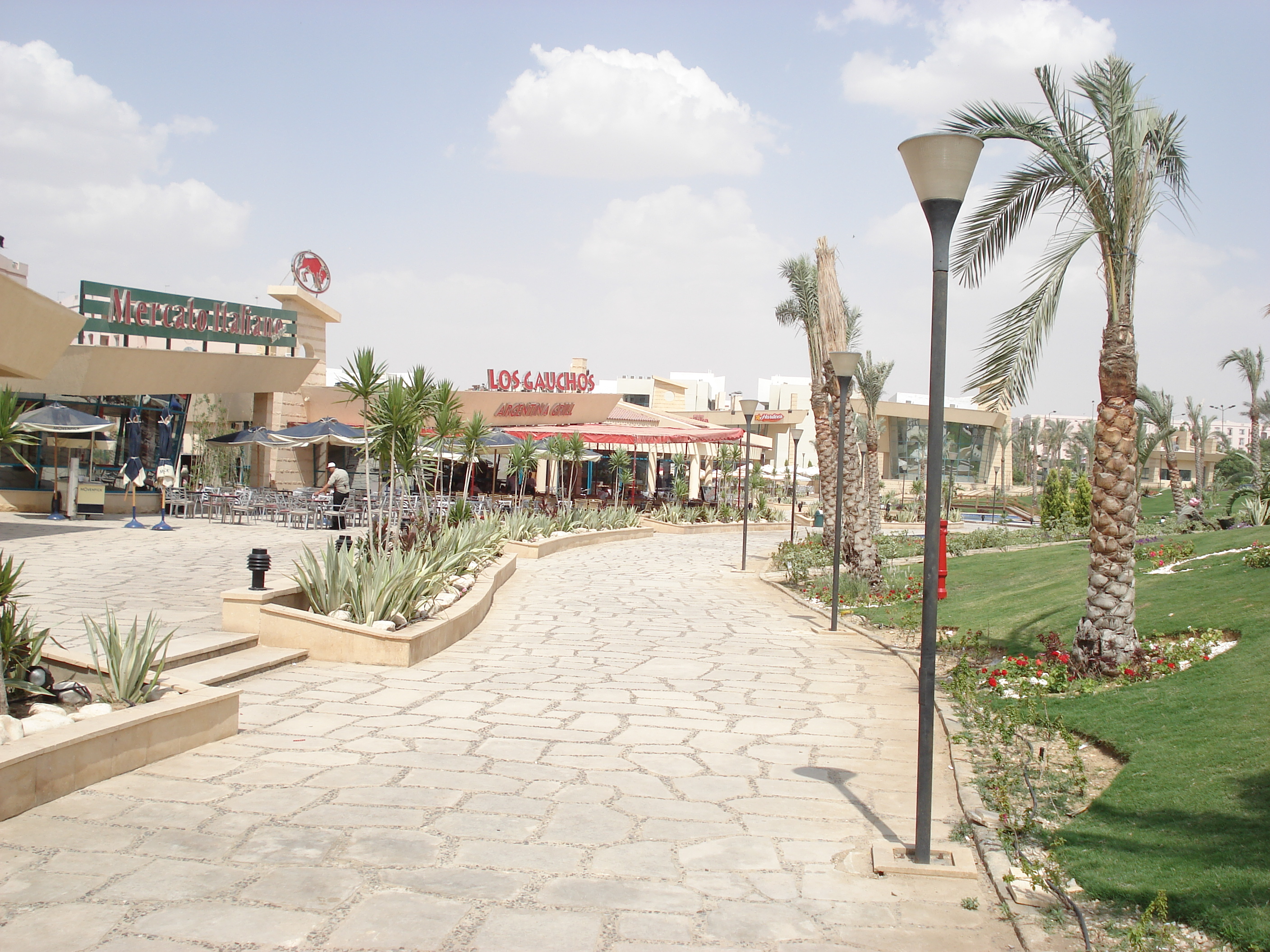

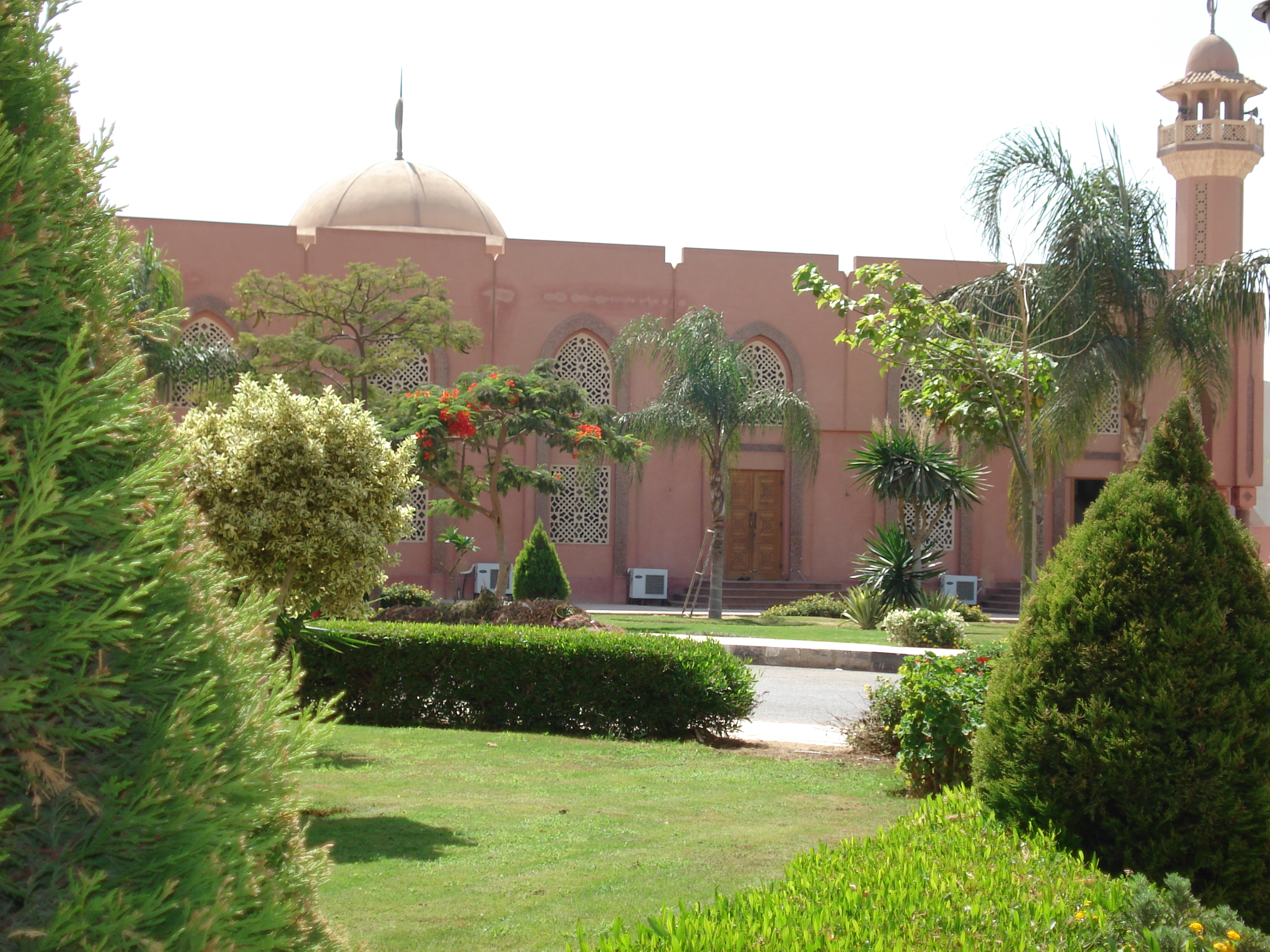

Al Rehab (Arabic: مدينة الرحاب pronounced [mæˈdiːnɪt eɾ.ɾeˈħæːb], literal meaning: "City of Spaciousness") is a district of New Cairo and a part of Greater Cairo, in the Cairo Governorate, Egypt. It is a private city built by the Talaat Moustafa Group. Al Rehab is a fully-fledged community, which creates a comprehensive, integrated residential scheme within the New Cairo plan. It covers an area of about 9 km^{2} to accommodate 200,000 residents. There are 10 phases, each covering an area of 220 feddans. Each phase is a complete district offering two kinds of housing arrangements: villas and apartments. All facilities are interconnected throughout the ten different phases to include educational, medical, commercial, sports club, recreational, and maintenance facilities.

At the North East side of New Cairo, at the intersection of the Eastern Ring Road with the Cairo/Suez Road, lies Al Rehab; ten minutes from Heliopolis and Nasr City, at the extension of Thawra street and Zakker Hussein street, from Nasr City, and 30 minutes from downtown Cairo. It is also roughly 1 hour from the city of Suez.

New Cairo includes the First, Third, and Fifth settlements, the American University in Cairo's new campus, the German University in Cairo, the British University in Egypt, and French Schools. Since it is not an industrial area, its elevated plane (which rises 60 meters over the Mukkatam Heights) is characterized by its unpolluted air and all-year-round moderate climate. To preserve that, New Cairo is surrounded by a wide green belt of lush greenery.

There are two shopping malls which house many stores and restaurants. Ganat ElKholoud, which is a charity organization, has an office located in Rehab city. The organization's scope of work includes raising awareness campaigns held in Al Rehab as well as the distribution of Ramadan food packages which is an event that is held every year before Ramadan where members of Rehab City assist in packing meals for the needy.

Al Rehab city has two Store compounds. Old Souq is located at gate 6, and New Souq is located at gate 23. El Rehab Avenue, Gate Way, and the Yard mall are now operating fully.

Al Rehab was developed and built by the Talaat Moustafa Group Holding, the largest real estate developer in Egypt and the Middle East.

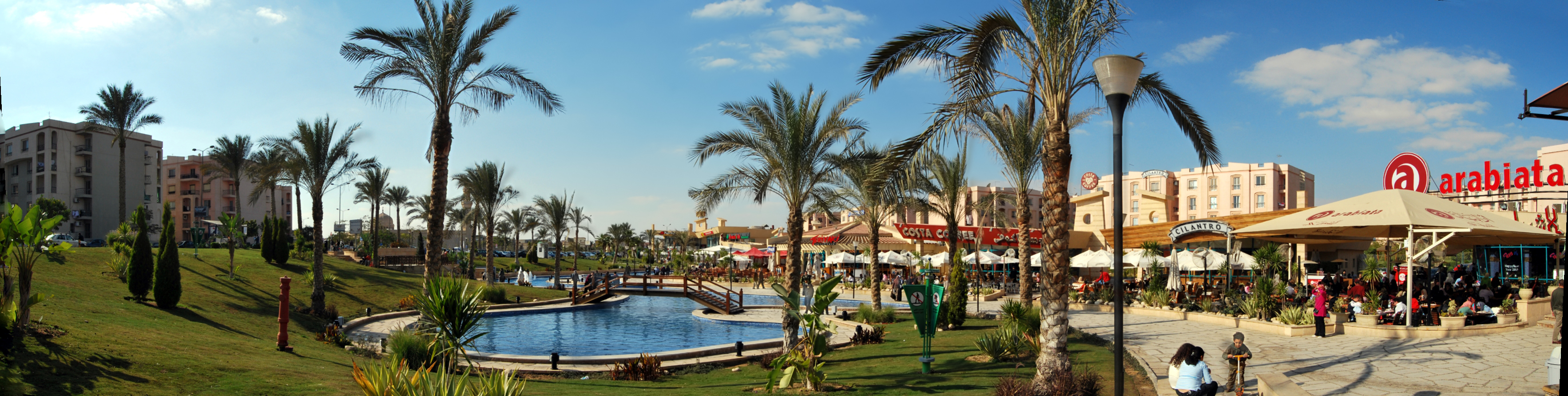
A panorama of the outside eating area for the Food Court, Rehab City

== See also ==
- Fifth Settlement
- New Cairo
- El Shorouk
- Greater Cairo
