= Greater Cairo =

Greater Cairo القاهرة الكبرى
- Metropolitan area

- Greater Cairo in red
- Coordinates: 30°03′N 31°22′E
- Country: Egypt
- Core cities: Cairo; Giza
- Satellite cities: 6th of October; Sheikh Zayed; New Cairo; 15th of May; Badr; Shubra El Kheima; Banha; Obour; 10th of Ramadan; New Administrative Capital

Area
  - Total: 5,020 km^{2} (1,940 sq mi)
- Highest elevation: 271 m (889 ft)
- Lowest elevation: 9 m (30 ft)

Population (2025)
  - Total: 29,900,000
  - Rank: 1st in Egypt
  - Density: 5,960/km^{2} (15,400/sq mi)
- Demonym: Cairene

GDP (2025)
  - Total: EGP 8.320 trillion (US$ 169 billion)
  - Per Capita: EGP 278,300 (US$ 5,652)
- Time zone: UTC+2 (EGY)

The Greater Cairo (Arabic: القاهرة الكبرى, romanized: Al-Qāhira al-Kubrā) is a metropolitan area centered around Cairo, Egypt. It comprises the entirety of the Cairo Governorate, the cities of Imbaba (Note: Imbaba is considered a city by the World Bank.) and Giza in the Giza Governorate, and the city Shubra El Kheima in Qalyubia Governorate. Its definition can be expanded to include peri-urban areas and a number of new planned towns founded in the desert areas east and west of Cairo. The Greater Cairo Region is also officially defined as an economic region consisting of the Cairo, Giza, and Qalyubia Governorates. Within Greater Cairo lies the largest metropolitan area in Egypt, the largest urban area in Africa, the Middle East, and the Arab world, and the 6th largest metropolitan area in the world.

In its larger definition, the area includes all cities in the Cairo Governorate (Cairo, New Cairo, Badr, Shorouk, 15th of May, New Administrative Capital, and Capital Gardens) as well as the main cities of the Giza Governorate (Giza, 6th of October, New 6 October, October Gardens, Sheikh Zayed, and New Sphinx) and Shubra El Kheima and Obour in the Qalyubia Governorate. According to an estimate based on United Nations projections, the area had a population of 22,183,000 in 2023. In 2012, when the area's population was estimated at 20.5 million, the population density within Cairo Governorate was estimated at 45,000 per square kilometer (111,700 per square mile).

== Economy ==
In 2021, Greater Cairo had GDP of around 3 trillion EGP or half of total Egypt GDP.

Governorate	Nominal GDP (billion EGP)	Nominal GDP (billion USD)
Cairo	1,876	120
Giza	770	49
Qalyubiyya	339	22
Greater Cairo	2,985	191

== Climate ==
The Greater Cairo Area and its surrounding region is classified as hot desert climate (BWh) in Köppen-Geiger classification, as all of Egypt. Cairo and its surrounding region have very similar day to day temperatures; however, the less populated parts at the east and the west do not experience the urban heat island effect, which makes them more prone to have soft hail.

Cairo

Climate chart (precipitation, max. and min. temperature)
J	F	M	A	M	J	J	A	S	O	N	D
5 19 7	3 21 8	3 24 11	1 29 13	0 32 17	0 35 19	0 35 21	0 35 21	0 33 19	0 30 17	3 26 13	4 21 9
- █ Average max. and min. temperatures in °C
- █ Precipitation totals in mm
- Source: Weather2Travel
Imperial conversion
J	F	M	A	M	J	J	A	S	O	N	D
0.2 66 45	0.1 70 46	0.1 75 52	0 84 55	0 90 63	0 95 66	0 95 70	0 95 70	0 91 66	0 86 63	0.1 79 55	0.2 70 48
- █ Average max. and min. temperatures in °F
- █ Precipitation totals in inches

== Urban issues ==
60% of all informal houses in Egypt are located in the Greater Cairo area.

== Main cities ==
Center and south

- Cairo (Note: Helwan, a district in southern Cairo, was briefly made a separate city in a new governorate in 2008. It was re-absorbed into the borders of Cairo when this act was repealed in 2011.))

West

- Giza

North

- Shubra El Kheima

== Satellite cities and towns ==
North

- Banha
- Obour (city)

South

- 15th of May (city)

West

- Sheikh Zayed City
- 6th of October
  - Large real estate developments: Dreamland
- New 6 October
- October Gardens (Hadayek October)
- New Sphinx

East

- El Shorouk
  - Large real estate developments: New Heliopolis, Future City
- Badr
- New Cairo
  - Large real estate developments: 5th Settlement, El Rehab, Madinaty
- New Administrative Capital

=== Sometimes included ===
North

- 10th of Ramadan (city)

== See also ==
- Cairo Metro
- List of radio stations in Greater Cairo
