= Said Mansour Rezk Abdelrazek =

Egyptian Christian convert detained in Egypt (born c. 1995)

Said Mansour Rezk Abdelrazek (also transliterated Said Abdel-Razek or Saeid Mansour Abdulraziq; born c. 1995) is an Egyptian convert from Islam to Christianity who has been detained in Egypt since July 2025 on terrorism-related charges. The United States Commission on International Religious Freedom (USCIRF) has designated him a religious prisoner of conscience, stating that he is detained for his religious conversion and activity. His case has drawn appeals from international human rights organizations, including the Cairo Institute for Human Rights Studies.

== Background ==
Abdelrazek was born in Egypt to Muslim parents. He converted from Islam to Christianity in the mid-2010s; advocacy organizations give the year of his conversion as 2016, while USCIRF gives 2018. According to USCIRF, his conversion exposed him to legal, social, and civil obstacles to practicing his faith in Egypt. Apostasy is not a criminal offense under Egyptian law, but changing the religious designation on official identity documents is effectively impossible for converts from Islam.

== Asylum in Russia and refoulement ==
Abdelrazek left Egypt for Russia and formally joined the Russian Orthodox Church. In 2023, Russian authorities arrested him in connection with a privately filmed video that was deemed offensive to Islam. He was then imprisoned for eleven months. In October 2024 he was deported to Egypt; USCIRF characterized the removal as refoulement, noting that he was returned despite documentation from the UNHCR indicating that he qualified for protection. On return, Egyptian authorities held him incommunicado for approximately ten days, questioned him about his beliefs, and released him with instructions not to speak publicly about his faith.

== Detention and trial in Egypt ==
On 15 July 2025, Egyptian authorities detained Abdelrazek at his home in Cairo after he resumed posting about his religious beliefs online; USCIRF states the arrest was made without a warrant. On 22 July 2025, Egypt's Supreme State Security Prosecution charged him with contempt for Islam, joining a banned terrorist organization, inciting unrest, and disseminating false information. Additional charges reported by his supporters include establishing, joining, and financing an unlawful group and promoting ideas deemed harmful to national unity.

While imprisoned, USCIRF reported that authorities and inmates physically and psychologically abused him during detention; advocacy groups further allege that he was tortured.

His trial opened in April 2026 before the First Criminal Terrorism Circuit in Badr. At an April 2026 hearing, his defense team, which included the Egyptian Initiative for Personal Rights and the Egyptian Commission for Rights and Freedom, requested an adjournment to prepare a full defense, and the court adjourned proceedings to June 2026.

== International response ==
USCIRF lists Abdelrazek in its database of victims of religious persecution and designated him a religious prisoner of conscience. In September 2025, a coalition organized through the International Religious Freedom Roundtable wrote to Egypt's ambassador in Washington, D.C., calling for his release, and Coptic Solidarity launched an international campaign on his behalf. In January 2026, the Cairo Institute for Human Rights Studies published an appeal on behalf of an international coalition urging the Australian government to press for his release and grant him humanitarian protection.
