= Cairo–Alexandria desert road =

Road in Egypt

Coordinates: 30°14′55″N 30°40′41″E

Cairo–Alexandria Desert Road
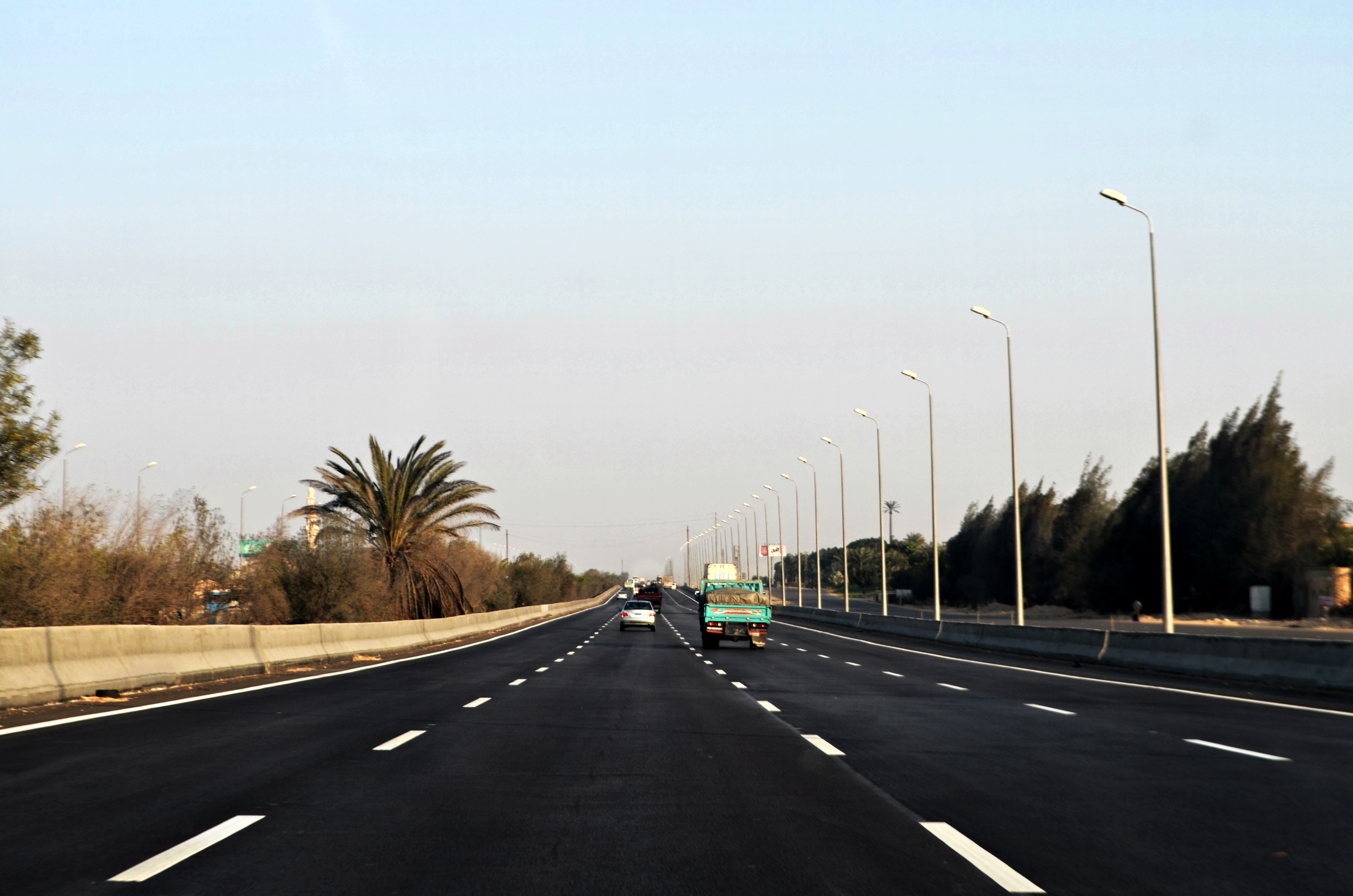

Route information
- Length: 220 km (140 mi)

Major junctions
- Eastern end: Giza
- Western end: Alexandria

Location
- Country: Egypt

Highway system
- Transport in Egypt

Cairo–Alexandria Desert Road, also known as the Cairo–Alexandria Freeway and the Cairo–Alexandria Highway, is the main highway that connects Cairo to Alexandria, the two largest cities in Egypt. It is 220 km long. It begins at Giza, at the northwest corner of Cairo's regional ring road, and ends in Alexandria (Kilo 21).

== History ==
- In 1935: The English Shell Company built the road six meters wide, built with rocks and covered with bitumen, using "mix in place" method.
- In 1959: The Egyptian government planned to cover the road with asphalt layers to enhance it.
- In 1971: The Egyptian government extended the road to 9 meters in width.
- In 1981: The Egyptian government added a second roadway. The road was thus upgraded to sustain 1,500 vehicles/day.
- In 1998: A third lane for each direction was established to increase the road capacity to sustain 13,500 vehicles/day.
- In 2003: A fourth lane for each direction was established to increase the road capacity to sustain 25,200 vehicles/day.
- In 2005: The government planned to light the road to increase the road's quality.

=== Development ===
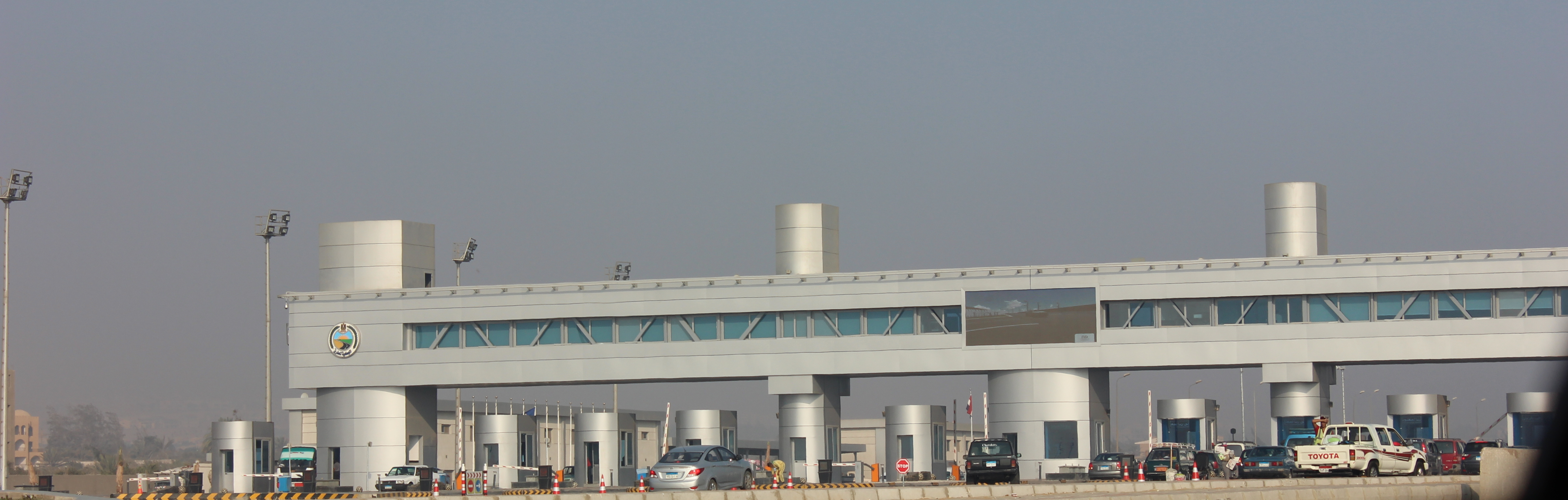
Toll station in Giza.

In 2007, the Egyptian government represented by the General Authority for Roads, Bridges and Land Transport planned to develop the Cairo-Alexandria-Marsa Matrouh desert road and turn it into a freeway in compliance with global standards. The project aimed to achieve the following:

- Establishing new service roads besides the main road to serve the existing structures along the road with ideal control for the road's entrances and exits.
- Cancelling all surface intersections, the main reasons for many accidents, by building new free intersections.
- Lighting up road by installing lamps.
- Supply the road with intelligent traffic systems, marks and signs.
- Evaluating the engineering situation for the existing road with its different intersections and detecting its traffic capacity to the targeted year 2025.
- Enhancing the road's specifications to comply with international freeway standards.
- Increasing the design speed to decrease the travel time.
- Decreasing the environmental effects.
- Developing the toll stations and building new ones.
- Developing emergency services like ambulance stations, emergency call cells and resting areas.

== Project phases ==
The GARBLT's plan to develop the road was divided into four phases as shown below:

Phase	Scope	No. of sections	Estimated cost (EGP)
Phase I	Cairo-Alexandria (26 km-126 km)	4	860 million
Phase II	Cairo-Alexandria (126 km-187 km)	2	520 million
Phase III	A new link road.	1	370 million
Phase IV	Alexandria-Marsa Matrouh	4	950 million
