= Europa-Schule Kairo =

German international school in Egypt

Coordinates: 30.0264°N 31.4230°E

Europe School Cairo
- Europa-Schule Kairo
- Cairo; Egypt

Information
- School type: Private School, International School
- Established: 1998
- Founder: Prof. Dr. Gamal Nawara
- Age: 3 to 18
- Enrollment: c. 1400
- Average class size: 25
- Language: German
- Website: https://europaschulekairo.com/

Europa-Schule Kairo (ESK) is a German international school in New Cairo, Cairo Governorate, Egypt.

It serves students until Gymnasium Sekundarstufe II.

It is recognized as a German school abroad by the Central Agency for German Schools Abroad (ZfA).

== History ==
The school was founded by Prof. Dr. Gamal Nawara in 1998.
