= Cairo Festival City =

- Cairo Festival City logo
- Interactive map of Cairo Festival City
- Coordinates: 30°01′37.29″N 31°24′42.48″E
- Country: Egypt
- Time zone: UTC+2 (EET)
  - Summer (DST): UTC+3 (EEST)
- Website: cairofestivalcity.com

Cairo Festival City is a mixed-use urban development in New Cairo, Egypt, located along the Cairo Ring Road. Developed by UAE-based Al-Futtaim Real Estate, it covers approximately 3 million square meters, combining residential, commercial, retail, hospitality, and entertainment facilities and was opened in 2010. At the center of the project is Cairo Festival City Mall, which opened in November 2013.

== History ==
In the late 1990s, Egypt's government allocated approximately 700 acres (2.94 million m^{2}) of land in New Cairo to Al-Futtaim. Al-Futtaim formally announced plans for Cairo Festival City in the mid-2000s. Construction officially began in 2008 and the complex was opened in 2010.

Residential and commercial phases, including Oriana Villas, Festival Living apartments, Aura residences, and the Business District office complex, were gradually completed between the late 2010s and early 2020s.

In 2013, Cairo Festival City Mall was opened at Cairo Festival City, featuring Egypt's first IKEA store, a Carrefour hypermarket, and international retail brands.

Over the years, Cairo Festival City has hosted concerts by musicians such as Angham, Faia Younan, Omar Khairat, Souad Massi.

== Facilities ==
Cairo Festival City is a mixed-use development covering approximately 3 million square meters, which includes residential, commercial, retail, hospitality, educational, and entertainment facilities. Residential areas within CFC include upscale villas in the Oriana neighborhood, as well as mid-rise apartment complexes such as Festival Living and Aura. The commercial zone consists of office buildings within the Business District, along with two additional office complexes known as Podium One and Podium Two.
