= British International College of Cairo =

BICC - British International College of Cairo
- New Cairo (Main Campus); Egypt

Information
- Established: 2015
- Grades: K-12
- Age: 3 to 16 yrs
- Website: bicc.edu.eg

The British International College of Cairo (BICC) is a pre-school, primary school and secondary school based in 5th District in New Cairo, Egypt.

The BICC campus accommodates about 800 students from pre-K to year 12. Built on a 7,000 square metre site, the school has attractive modern facilities with 42 classrooms, 3 labs and 8 activity classes. The school has a student-to-teacher ratio of 11:1.

In 2024 it was awarded first place in Egypt for the film 'Thrift to Uplift' at the British Council ' Your World ' video competition award ceremony.

The British International College of Cairo, prepares students for LIFE. BICC offers a British education.

== Campuses ==
The BICC Campus includes sports fields built on a 4,000 square meter area. The college has a multi-purpose sports hall, gymnasium, fitness gym, volleyball and football facilities as well as a swimming pool.

== Multi-purpose theatre ==
The BICC has a small theatre without a stage for dramatic performances and music festivals.

== London Summer Camp ==
In its opening year, and again in 2019, BICC ran an English Summer Camp in the UK.
