= New Cairo =

City of Cairo Governorate, Egypt

New Cairo القاهرة الجديدة
- City
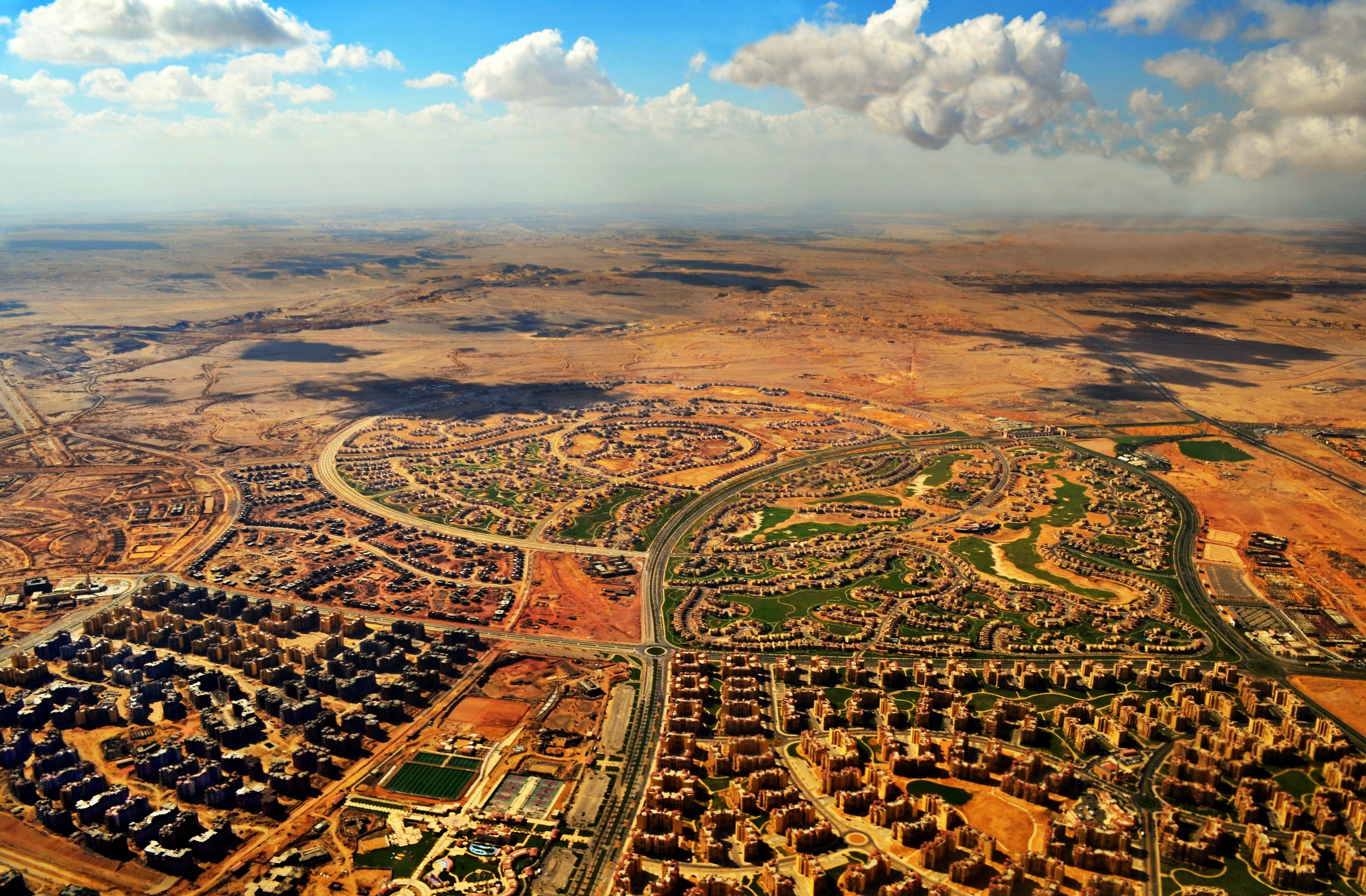
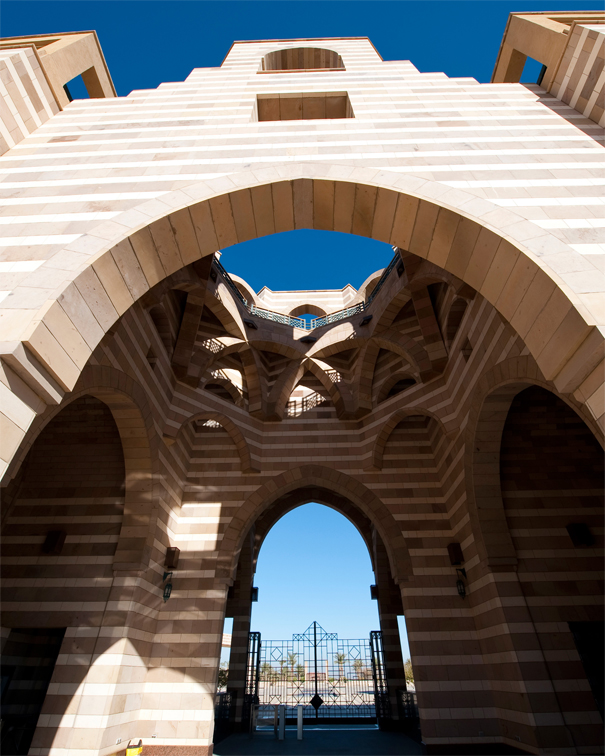
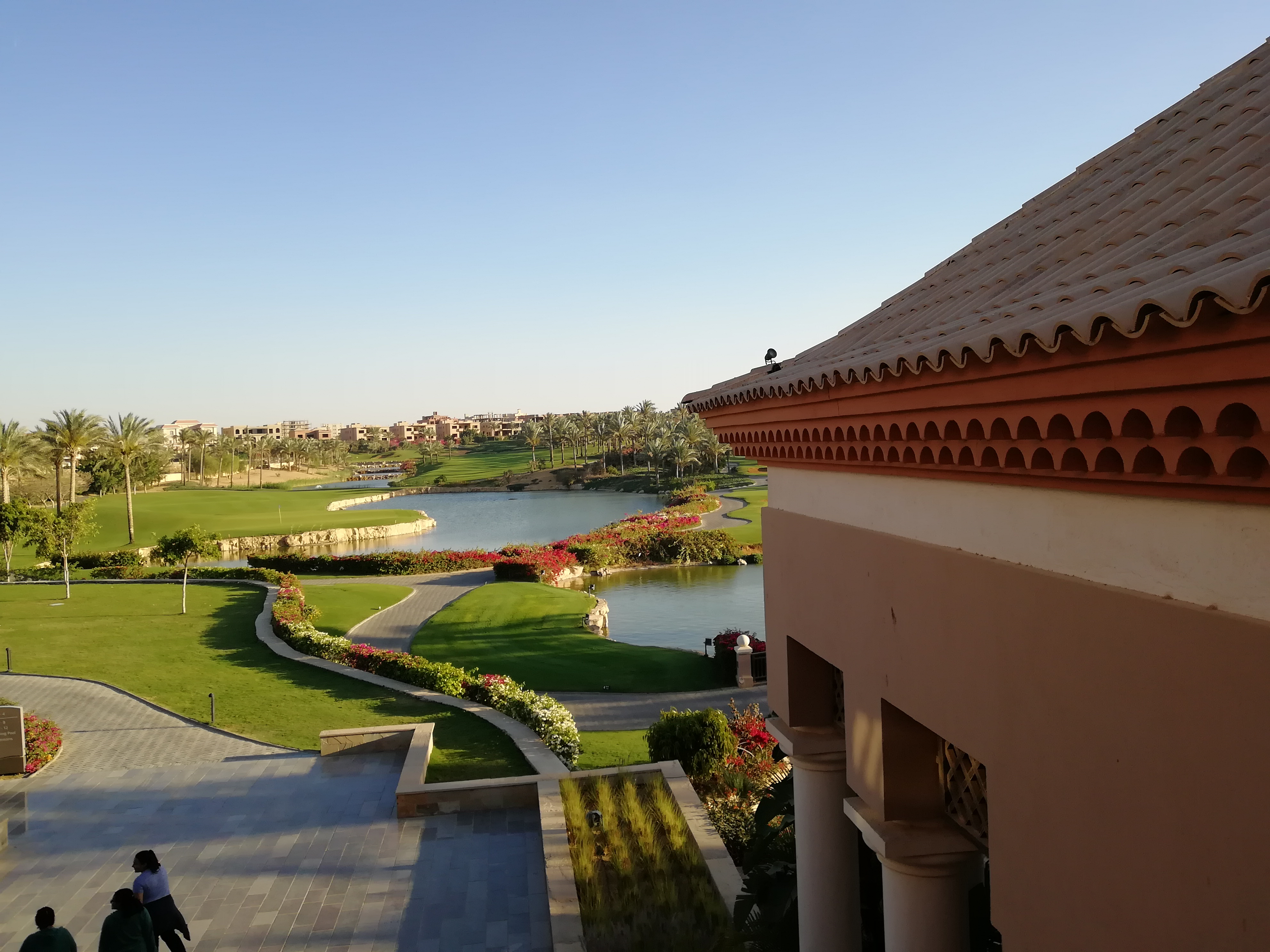
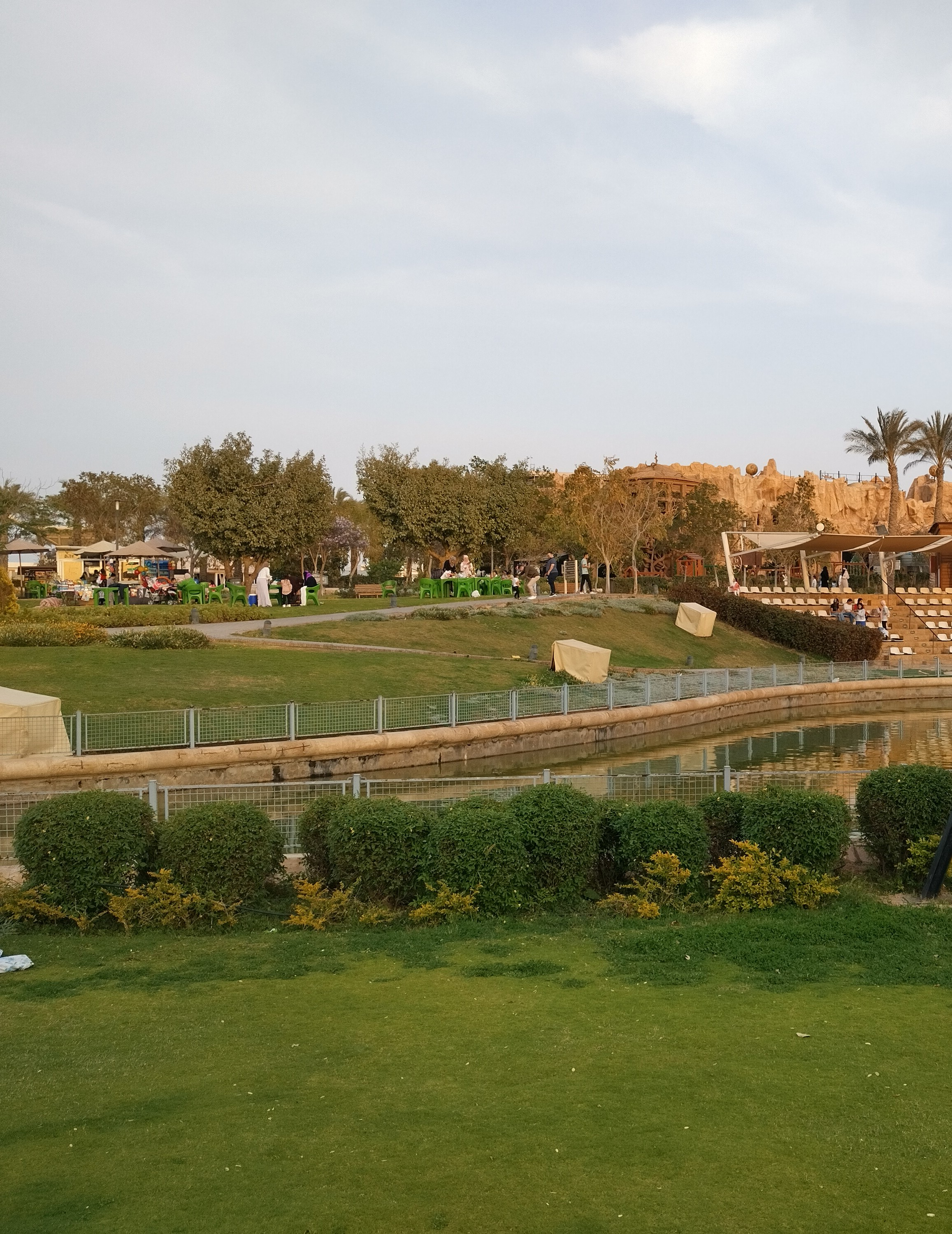
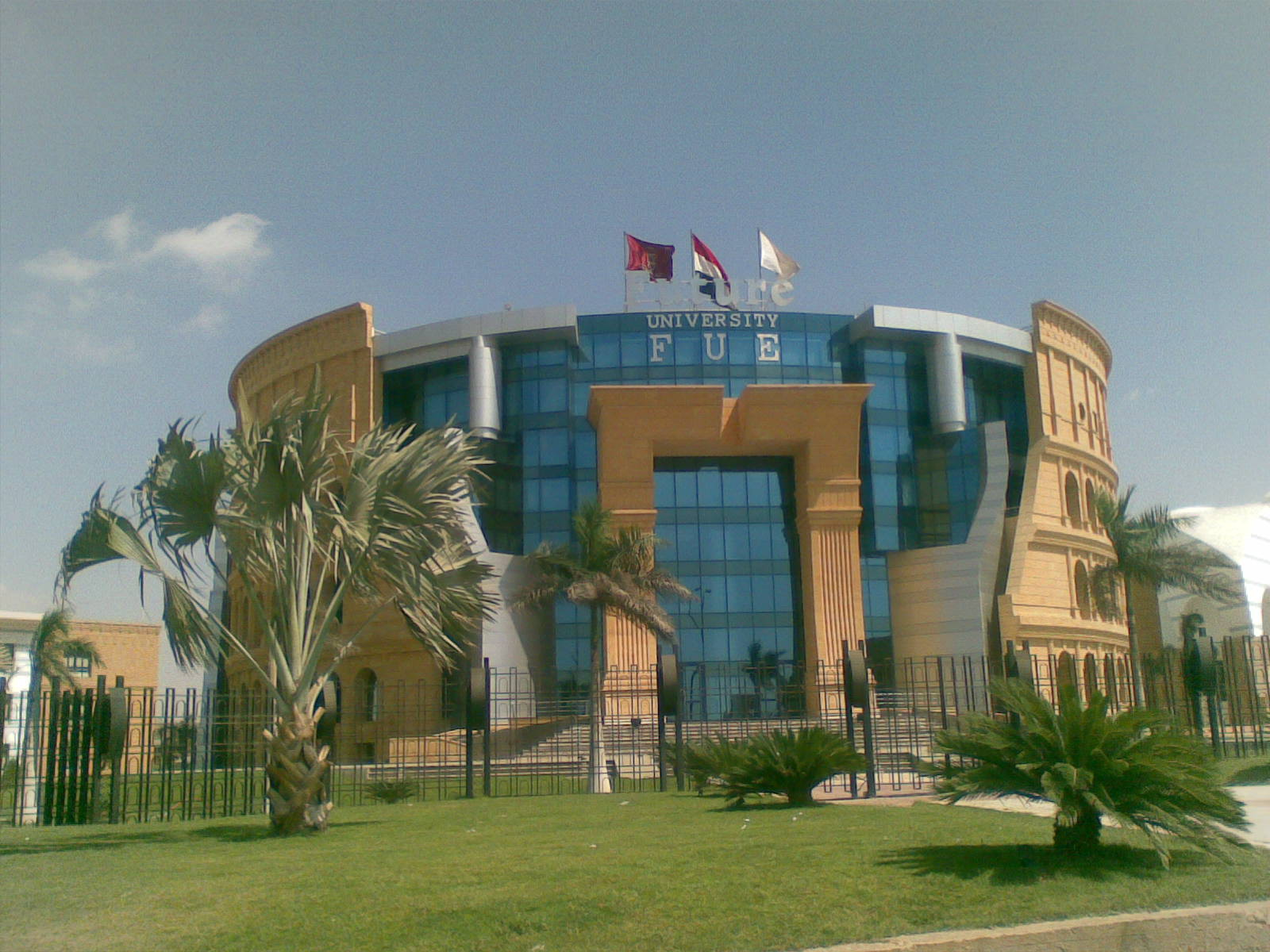
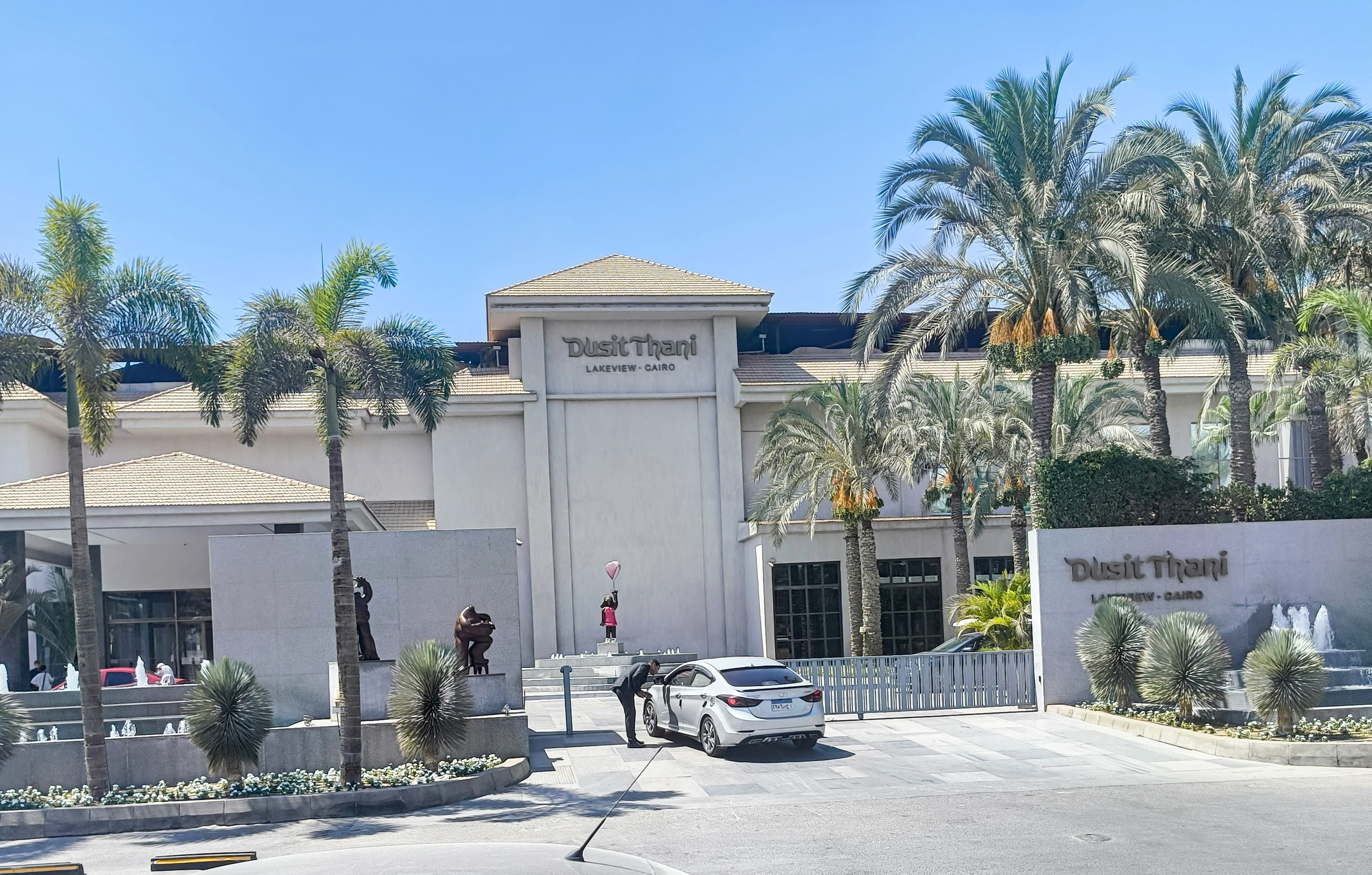
- Madinaty AUC The Westin Family Park FUE Dusit International

- Location in Egypt
- Coordinates: 30.03°N 31.47°E
- Country: Egypt
- Governorate: Cairo
- Metropolitan area: Greater Cairo

Government
  - Type: Development Agency
  - Chairman: Amin Ghoneim

Area
  - Total: 343 km^{2} (132 sq mi)
- Elevation: 271 m (889 ft)

Population (2026)
  - Total: 3,000,000
- Demonym: New Cairene
- Time zone: UTC+2 (EET)
  - Summer (DST): UTC+3 (EEST)
- Area code: (+20) 2

New Cairo (Note: (Arabic: القاهرة الجديدة el-Qāhera el-Gedīda)) is a modern satellite city within the Cairo Governorate of Egypt and the metropolitan area of Greater Cairo, whose formation was first initiated by a presidential decree in 1995 during the presidency of former Egyptian President Hosni Mubarak.

Administratively, it is officially part of the Eastern Area of Cairo city, but like all new settlements in Egypt, it is directly governed by the New Urban Communities Authority (NUCA).

The city was established in 2000 as part of Egypt's strategic effort to alleviate the chronic congestion of Greater Cairo by decentralising population and economic activity. As of 2024, New Cairo covered 99,814 acres (40,393 Ha), and is made up of a mix of residential neighbourhoods, commercial centres, and institutional zones. It is home to several gated communities, private universities, malls, international schools, and corporate headquarters, positioning it as a hub for Cairo’s upper and elite classes. Its development reflects Egypt’s broader neoliberal urban planning strategies, aimed at attracting private investments and promoting modern and western lifestyles.

According to the 2026 Prime Minister Mostafa Madbouly’s decree, New Cairo's three qisms (police districts) had a combined population of 3,000,000 residents (also see population section below). The city could eventually host a population of 5 million. When compared to 6th of October, also built with the hopes of alleviating the strain on Cairo, more homes are being rented out in New Cairo. New Cairo has attracted both praise and criticism. While it is seen as a model for modern urban expansion, it is also scrutinised for social exclusivity and limited accessibility for lower-income classes.

== History ==
After the 1952 revolution, in which the pro-Western monarchy was overthrown fuelled by Egyptian nationalism, a new urban vision emerged to symbolise the passing of the colonial era. The new republic established Gamal Abdel Nasser as its president, who created public spaces such as the Nile corniche to reclaim Cairo from its colonial past. Cairo’s landscape underwent great transformations as the government, undertook large-scale socialist housing projects to provide affordable housing to the newly arrived masses from the countryside seeking job opportunities. However, as the demographic grew rapidly as a result of industrialisation, the government struggled to control the growth and expansion of the city.

As the population continued to grow throughout the late 50s, rising land prices pushed lower- and middle Egyptians to settle informally on the outskirt of Cairo, into the desert onto privately owned agricultural land without official authorisation due to their affordability. This trend accelerated, and by 1990 the informal settlements housed nearly two-thirds of Cairo’s population. Despite their significance, successive governments largely overlooked these districts. The failure to provide adequate low-income housing was compounded by the economic liberalisation policies of the infitah era, which led to the continuous devaluation of the Egyptian pound and a stark decline is its purchasing power. Families sought alternative housing in graveyards, rooftop shacks, garages, and shared apartments. Cairo’s environmental conditions degraded, and became marked by visual chaos, polluted streets, and risen noise levels.

=== The Rise of New Cairo ===
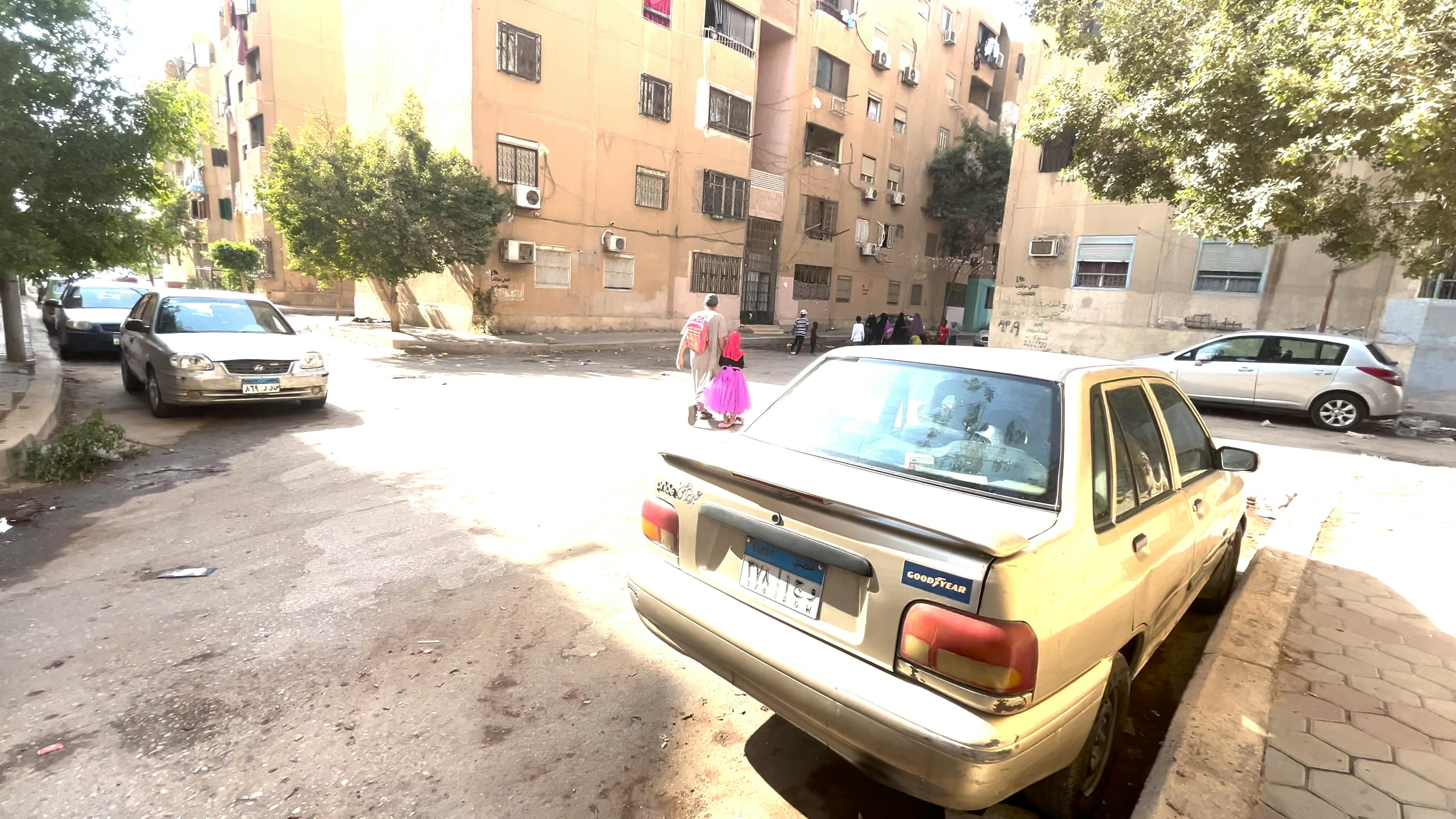
Shot of New Cairo

The deteriorating conditions in central Cairo once again prompted an interest in desert expansion for the upper class. The state actively facilitated this shift by privatising desert land with real estate developers, creating new financial and investment opportunities. The city’s function shifted from a site of social reproduction to a space shaped by entrepreneurialism, market-oriented production, and consumerist lifestyles. Dozens of luxury compounds were constructed on Cairo’s outskirts, featuring golf courses, private universities, shopping malls, simulating an idealised urban lifestyle. The appeal of New Cairo was enhanced by the degradation of public space in the old city, from traffic and pollution to overcrowding.

Urban planners characterised this transformation as a form of gentrification, as before the development of New Cairo, the area was home to three informal settlements housing poor families and the unhoused. These communities were later displaced, as the land was sold off to private investors. Although New Cairo was envisioned as a city akin to Heliopolis, housing all social classes, the dominance of private interest turned the area into a symbol of exclusion, reinforcing Cairo’s socio-spatial inequalities.

== Administrative subdivisions and population ==
New Cairo, like most new cities in Egypt, is not administratively a city under Local Administration Law, rather a group of three qisms (police wards) attached to the Eastern Area of Cairo proper: Al-Qahira al-Gadida Awwal, Thani, and Thalith (New Cairo 1st, 2nd, and 3rd). New Cairo is jointly administered by the Ministry of Housing's New Urban Communities Authority through a subsidiary agency (gehaz al-Qahira al-Gadida), and Cairo Governorate.

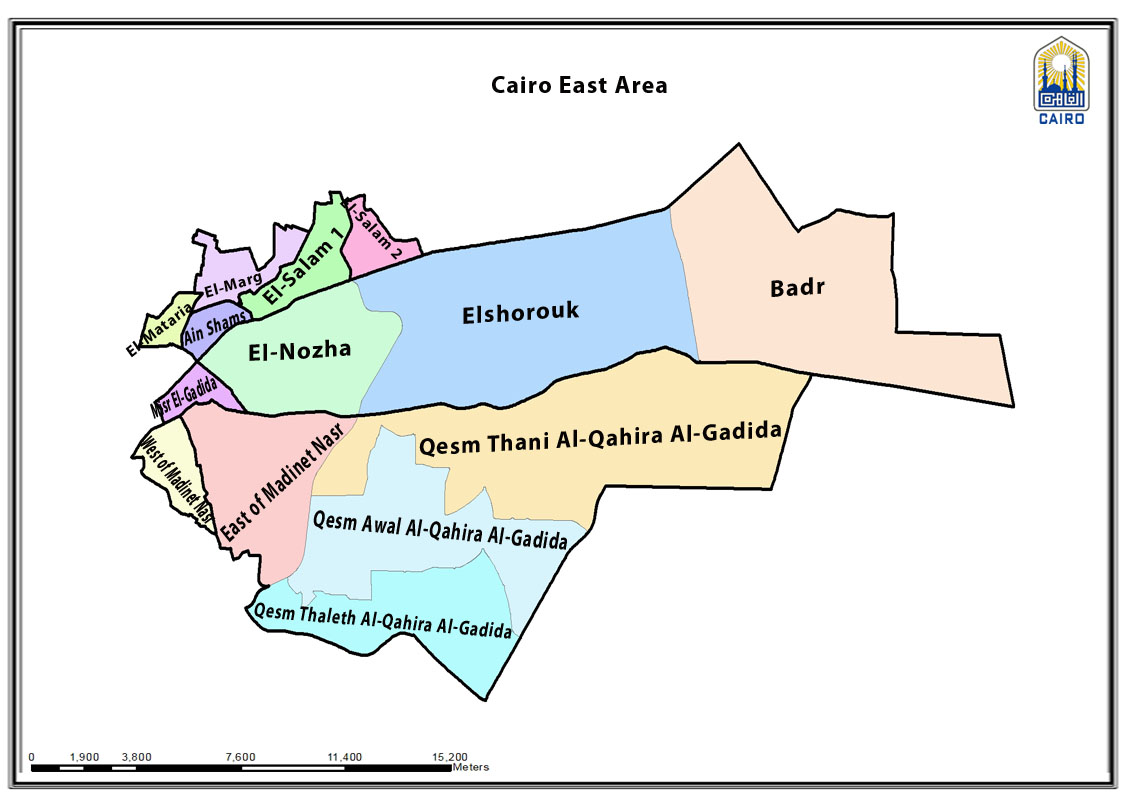
Map of Eastern Area of Cairo showing New Cairo (al-Qahira al-Gadida) as three qisms. Note Shorouk and Badr new cities are one qism each.

According to the 2017 census New Cairo's three qisms had a combined population of 297,387 residents: This is in stark contrast to the New Urban Communities Authority's (NUCA) undated population estimate of 1.5 million inhabitants and a target population of 4 million inhabitants. However, the same source contradicts this claim where it states 70,000 homes as built, leading to an impossibly high average of 21 people per home. The lower population figure translates into a more realistic 4 people per home.

Qism	Code 2017	Population
Qâhira al-Gadîda 1, al-	014200	135,834
Qâhira al-Gadîda 2, al-	014300	90,668
Qâhira al-Gadîda 3, al-	014400	70,885

Al-Qahira al-Gadida Awwal had 135,834 residents across its four shiakhas (quarters):

Shiakha	Code 2017	Population
Jâmi`a al-Amrîkiyya, and al-Rawḍa, al-	014204	451
Narjis, and al-Mustathmirîn al-janûbiyya, al-	014202	15,175
Tajammu` 5, al-	014201	36,830
Yâsamîn et al-Banafsij, and al-Mustathmirîn al-shamâliyya, al-	014203	83,378

Al-Qahira al-Gadida Thani had 90,668 residents across its three shiakhas:

Shiakha	Code 2017	Population
Akâdimiyyat al-Shurṭa, and al-Mîrâj	014303	2,928
Firdaws, and al-Kawthar, al-	014302	24,010
Riḥâb, and al-Mustathmirûn, al-	014301	63,730

Al-Qahira al-Gadida Thalith had 70,885 residents across its five shiakhas:

Shiakha	Code 2017	Population
Andalus, al-	014405	330
Anshiṭa, al-	014403	1
Iskân Mubarak li-l-Shabâb	014402	46,421
Manṭiqa al-Ṣinâ`iyya, al-	014404	59
Qaṭṭâmiyya, al-	014401	24,074

== Geography ==
New Cairo is built in the Eastern Desert to the east of the Cairo Ring Road and the modern 1950s extension of Nasr City, on a plateau that ranges in elevation between 250 and 307 metres (820 and 1,007 ft) above sea level. It was created to comprise three towns (The First, Third, and Fifth settlements), originally on an area of about 67,000 acres which had grown to 85,000 acres by 2016. In 2024, it had expanded further to 99,814 acres. The Petrified Forest Protected Area is of particular significance to geologists, located south of New Cairo. It is a protected site.

== Economy and utilities ==
There are dozens of factories in New Cairo. General Electric are working with the American University in New Cairo on energy initiatives. El Sewedy Electric has its headquarters in the Fifth Settlement of New Cairo.

The city is connected to other cities by a vast network of bus lines, and construction has begun for a monorail line that connects the city with the Cairo suburb of Nasr City to the west, and the New Administrative Capital to the east. The city gets its drinking water from a water plant in Obour City, nearby.

A branch of Al Ahly SC is currently under construction in the eastern part of the city. There is also a championship golf course with tennis lies in the Kattameya section of the city.

At the entrance of New Cairo is Cairo Festival City, a 285 hectare (700 acres) real estate development which has parks, games, pools, gardens, walkways, business office space, a large mall and a dancing fountain. In addition to that, there are many other malls in New Cairo including Point 90, Downtown Kattameya, Porto Cairo, Emerald Plaza and Park mall, in addition to numerous other, smaller malls.

Demand for real estate in New Cairo has been very high, with prices per metre for apartments averaging around E£10,000, and for villas E£19,000. It has continued increasing, especially after the construction of the New Administrative Capital to the east. The government has also moved many services and administrations to the city, the most notable of which were the Traffic Administration offices of Nasr City, Heliopolis and New Cairo (which was previously located in El Shorouk) in 2020, as they were all moved into one three-floor building in the southern part of the city.

== Sports ==
The city is home to two professional football clubs: ENPPI SC, formed in 1985, plays at the Petrosport Stadium, and Pyramids FC, who play at the 30 June Stadium. Although the two teams are based in New Cairo, they neither represent the city nor carry its name. Two new semi professional teams, 1st Settlement Youth and Katameya Petrosport Club, which carry the names of neighbourhoods of the city, have joined the Egyptian Fourth Division.

== Education ==
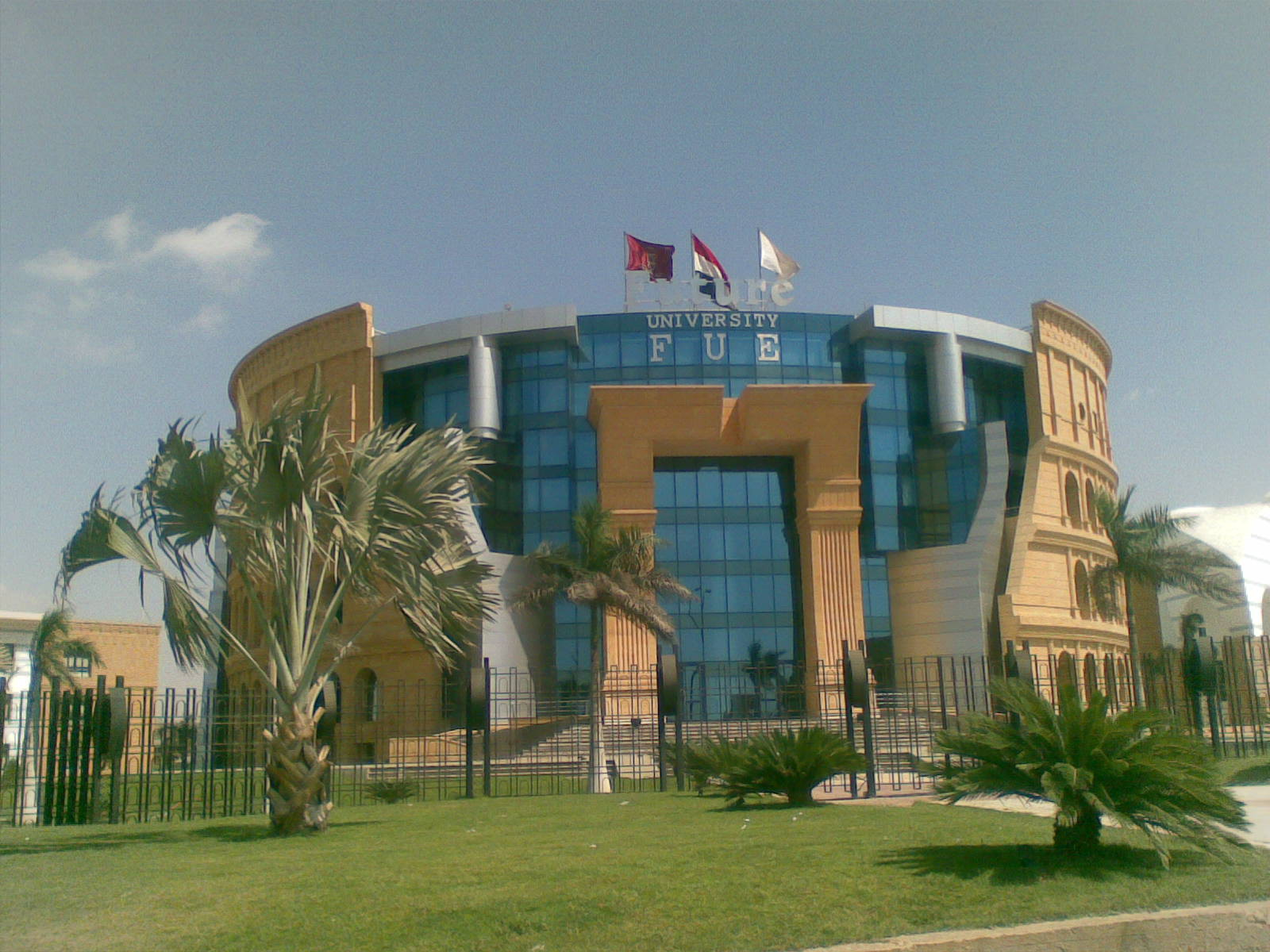
Administration building, Future University in Egypt

=== Schools ===
- Capital International Schools (CIS)
- British International College of Cairo
- American International School in Egypt (AIS) East (Main) Campus
- New Cairo British International School (NCBIS)
- International School of Choueifat (ISC) – Cairo campus
- Modern Education Schools (MES).
- Modern English School Cairo (MESC)
- Salahaldin International School (SIS)
- Lycée Français du Caire New Cairo Primary Campus
- Korean School in Cairo (카이로한국학교), a South Korean international school
- Canadian International School of Egypt
- Malvern College Egypt
- Gateway International Montessori School
- Cairo English School
- Europa-Schule Kairo
- Europaschule Neu Kairo
- Repton School Cairo
- Nile International College
- Lycée Internationale Français en Égypte (Concordia)
- Egypt British International School
- Madinaty Language School

=== Universities ===
- American University in Cairo (AUC)
- German University in Cairo (GUC)
- Future University in Egypt (FUE)
- Canadian International College (CIC)
- New Cairo Academy

== Gated communities ==
- Mostakbal City, 11,000 acres
- Madinaty, 8000 acres
- Al-Rehab, 3000 acres
- Qattamia Heights
- Mivida New Cairo by Emaar Misr
- Hyde Park New Cairo, 1000 acres
- Mountain View Hyde Park, Mountain View 2 & Mountain View iCity
- Les Rois
- Taj City
- Eastown & Villette by SODIC
- Katameya Heights New Cairo & Katameya Dunes New Cairo
- The Square
- Stone Park & Stone Residence by Rooya
- Lake View & Lake View Residence
- Palm Hills Katameya & Palm Hills New Cairo
- Riviera
- Azad
- Regent's Park
- Village Gardens Katameya
- Dyar Park
- Palm Hills Katameya
- Layan

== Malls ==
- Cairo Festival City
- Mirage Mall
- Point 90 Mall
- 5A, WaterWay and WaterWay 2
- Downtown Mall
- Garden 8
- Concorde Mall
- The Drive by The Waterway
- City Center Almaza
- Maxim Mall

== See also ==
- New Administrative Capital
