= Modern Education Schools =

- Cairo; Egypt

Information
- Type: Primary, preparatory and Secondary
- Motto: Together we build future Egyptian leaders
- Established: 1997
- Grades: kindergarten-12
- Enrollment: Approx. 1865
- Campus size: 12,000 m^{2} (3.0 acres)
- Website: www.mes.edu.eg

The Modern Education School (MES; Arabic: مدارس التربية الحديثة) is a private international school in New Cairo, Cairo Governorate.

The school, established in 1997, is co-educational and divided into three educational systems (the National division, American division, and British division), with grades from kindergarten to high school.

Partners:

- Goethe Institut (German)
- Schulen Partner Der Zukunft (German)
- NWEA

In 2002, the Los Angeles Times reported that children and teachers at the school had protested against the Israeli–Palestinian conflict.
