= Green Valley School =

Coordinates: 30.2356°N 31.4712°E

- مدارس جرين فالي

Location
- Moussa Ibn Nossair St. Obour City, Cairo, Egypt; Cairo, 11282; Egypt

Information
- Motto: Follow the rules; Accept your responsibilities; Uphold your rights.
- Established: 1998
- School district: El Obour City
- Grades: K-12
- Gender: Mixed
- Education system: Egyptian National & IGCSE
- Slogan: integrity, clear thinking, knowledge, awareness
- Website: http://www.gvs.edu.eg/

Green Valley School is a private trilingual (German, English, Arabic) school located in Obour City, Cairo. The school was established in 1998 amongst few trilingual schools in Egypt. It offers education from kindergarten stage to Year 12 or IGCSE. Arabic, German and English are taught in parallel.
