= Mountain View (Egypt) =

Egyptian real estate company

- Trade name: Mountain View for development and real estate investment
- Native name: ماونتن فيو للتنمية والاستثمار العقاري
- Industry: land banking, real estate development
- Founded: 2005; 21 years ago
- Founders: Mohamed Galal, Wahby Mohamed
- Headquarters: Cairo, Egypt
- Website: mountainviewegypt.com

Mountain View is an Egyptian real estate development company. It was founded in 2005 with its headquarters in Cairo. It was ranked among the five largest companies in the real estate sector in Egypt in 2021.

== Background ==
Mountain View was founded by Mohamed Galal, Wahby Mohamed and a group of ten additional investors in 2005, and launched its first project, Mountain View 1, New Cairo in 2006.

In 2016, Mountain View entered into an agreement with the Egyptian Ministry of Housing, Utilities & Urban Communities to launch the iCity New Cairo project followed by the iCity 6 October project in 2017.

In 2016, Mountain View announced its partnership with Delivering Happiness (DH), and in 2019 announced an agreement with CallisonRTKL. In 2020, Mountain View signed a partnership agreement with Huawei Technologies of $1 million. In 2021, Mountain View signed a partnership with IHG Hotels & Resorts, to manage its hotel apartments in its ICity projects. As of 2017, the company's portfolio reached 15 real estate projects, including Mountain View iCity, Mountain View Chillout Park, Mountain View Ras El Hikma, Mountain View Hyde Park and Mountain View iCity October.

== Finances ==
In 2019, the company's total sales revenue reached $350 million, and around $650 million through 2020. In 2021, Mountain View's total sales revenue reached $1.26 billion.
