= Obour (city) =

Obour العبور
- City
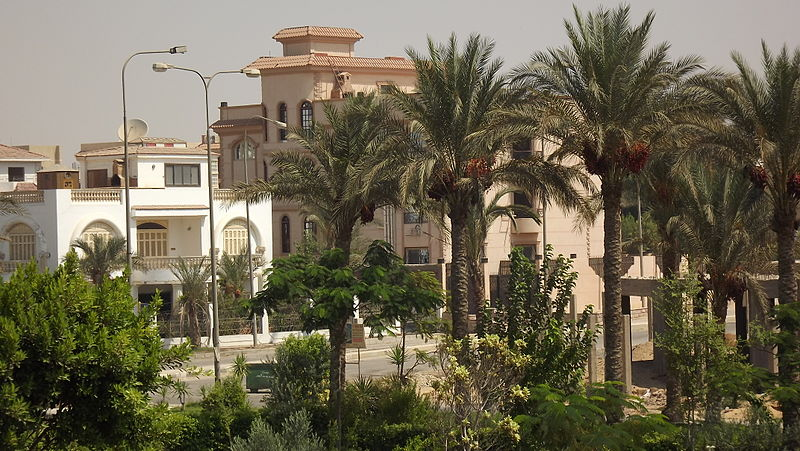
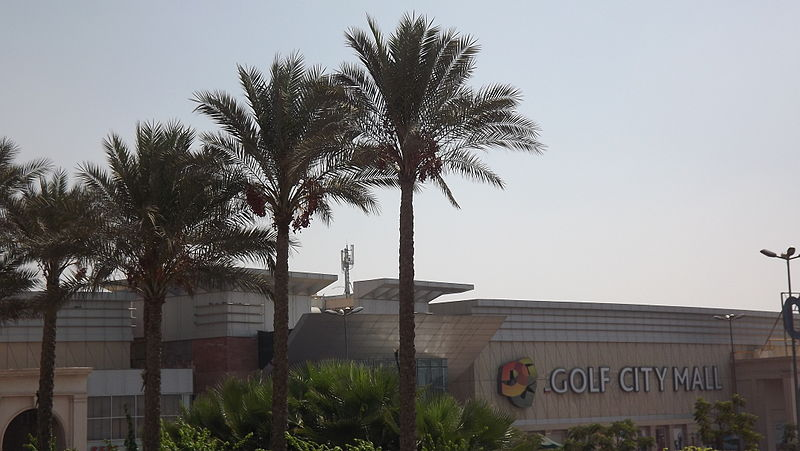
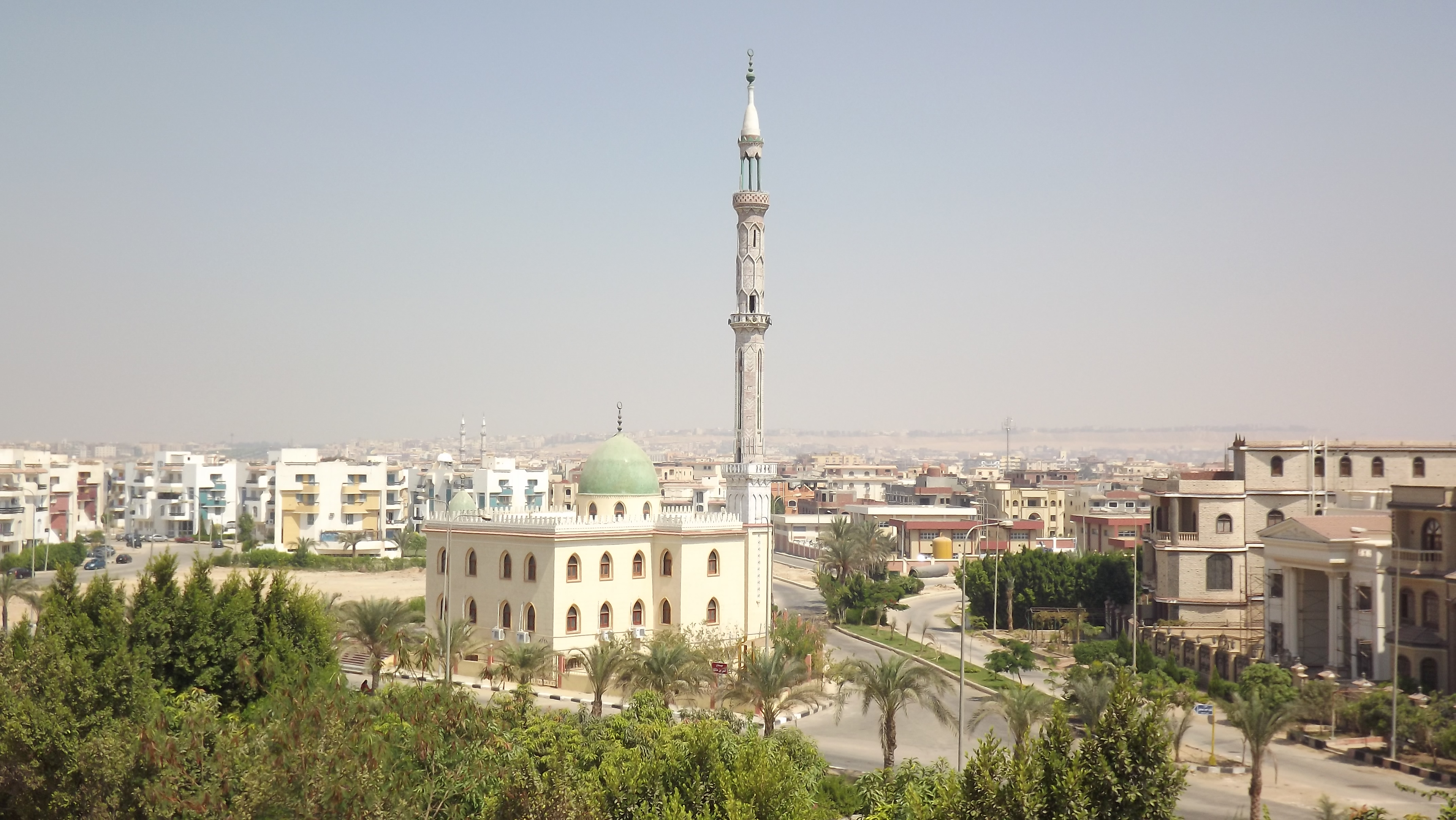
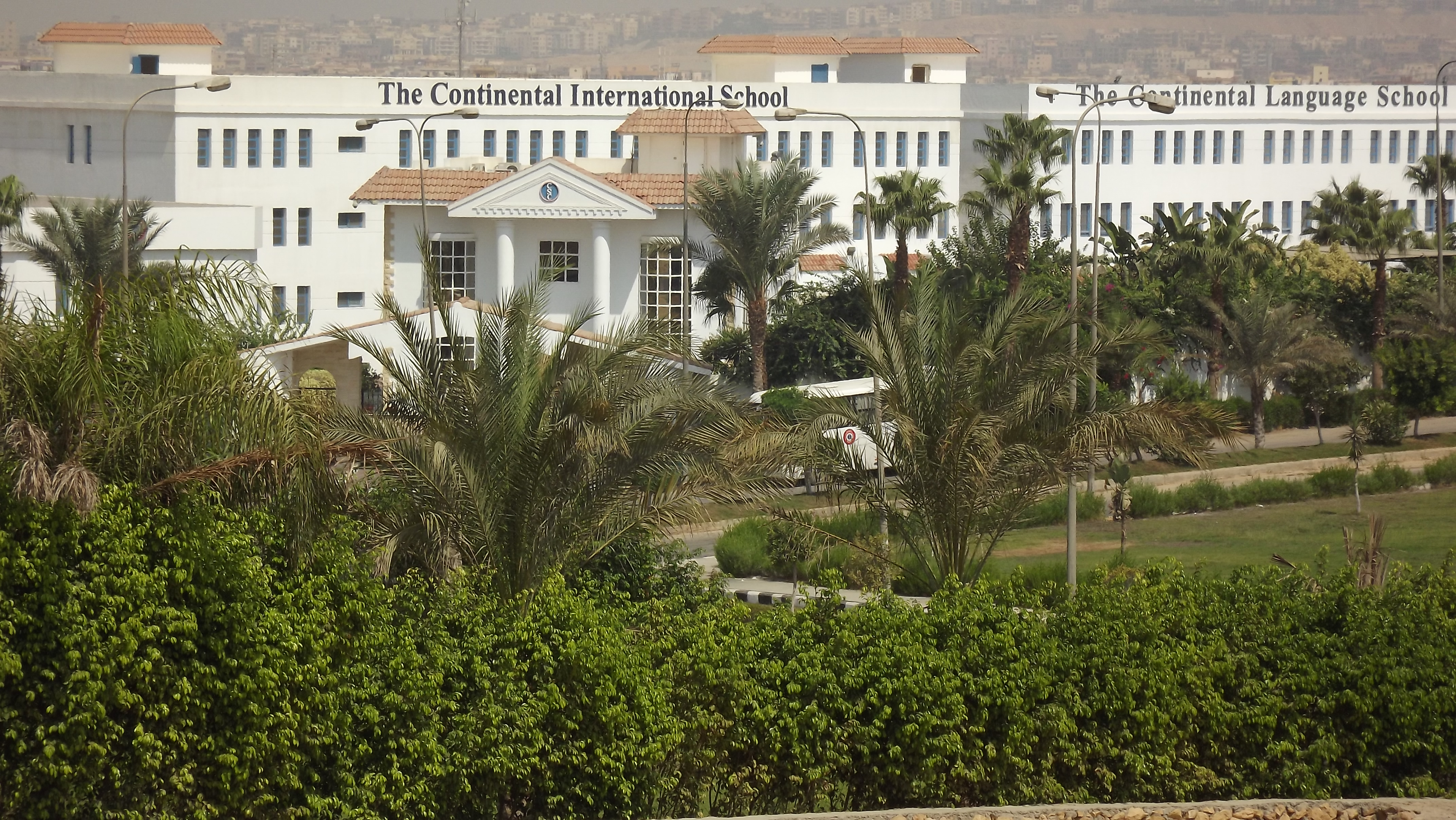
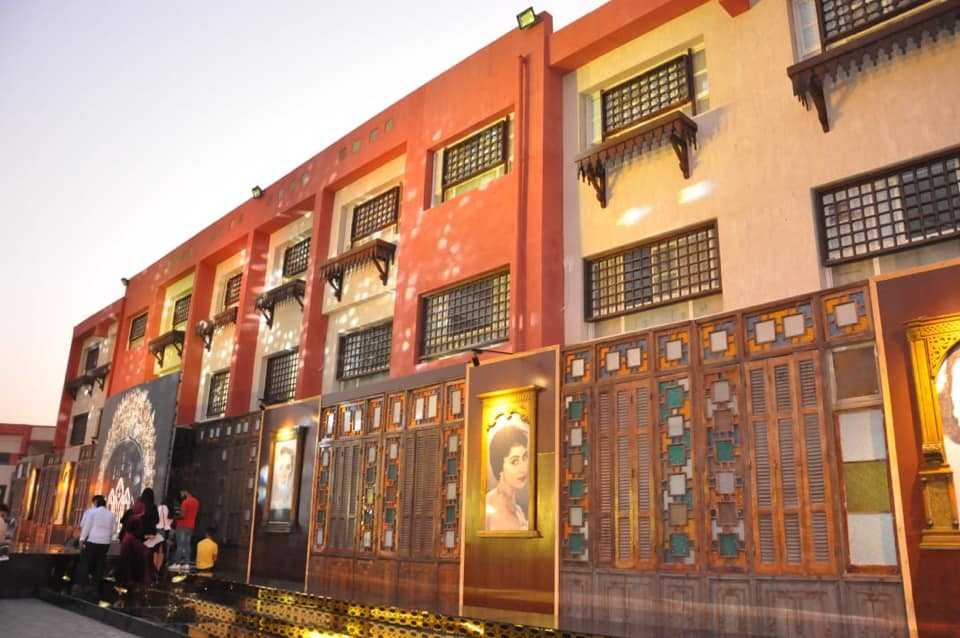
- Suburban area Golf City Mall Obour Mosque Continental International School Egypt Gold School of Applied Technology

- Location in Egypt
- Country: Egypt
- Governorate: Qalyubia
- Established: 1982

Area
  - Total: 209 km^{2} (81 sq mi)

Population (2023)
  - Total: 142,955
  - Density: 684/km^{2} (1,770/sq mi)
- Time zone: UTC+2 (EET)
  - Summer (DST): UTC+3 (EEST)

Obour (Arabic: العبور pronounced [mæˈdiːnɪt el ʕʊˈbuːɾ], meaning "The Crossing") is a city in the Qalyubia Governorate, about 35 kilometers north-east of Cairo. The city has 142,955 residents. It is named to honor the crossing ("obour") of the Bar Lev Line by the Egyptian Army during Operation Badr in 1973, part of the October War.

It is one of 16 new urban areas in Greater Cairo. It is also designated as an industrial zone and houses a number of factories.

== Layout ==
The city of El-Obour is considered a second-generation city and was established by Prime Minister Decision No. (1608) for the year 1990 and it is affiliated with the geography and administration of Cairo Governorate, one of the governorates of the Greater Cairo region.

The city of El-Obour is located from 9 km to 15 km, at a depth of 7 km, to the right of the Cairo-Bilbeis Desert Road.

The area of the urban cluster is 12.5 thousand, and the total area is 16 thousand acres. It is expected that the population of the city will reach 500 thousand people when its growth is complete.

The Authorities also provides investment companies and resorts, as well as pilot projects such as the Mubarak Housing Project, the Future Society Housing Project, and free housing and family housing projects.

The authority also created 29,987 housing units, including 12,732 youth housing units and a future with investments of 791 million pounds. The non-governmental sector created 580.70 housing units

The service activity area is 3.2 thousand acres, as urban planning provides the city with plots of various services (educational - health - cultural - religious - entertainment - commercial) The authority has established 74 service buildings with investments of 322.5 million pounds, including the Obour City Authority. In addition to the number of 169 non-governmental service buildings.

== Infrastructure ==
The city is fed with clean drinking water from the current purification plant with a capacity of 660 thousand m3 / day and a well station with a capacity of 38 thousand m3 / day. The water networks were constructed with a length of 862 km.

Lifting stations and expulsion lines are being implemented to transfer the city's actions to the Yellow Mountain treatment plant. Sewer networks were implemented with a length of 562 km. With investments of 866.6 million pounds for both drinking water and sanitation.

== Economy ==
The electricity networks were implemented with a length of 4,689 km. With investments of 705.5 million pounds.

The city of Obour is a major industrial city, with an industrial activity area of 3.7 thousand acres. The 432 productive factories, with investments of 4.69 billion pounds, provide 34.4 thousand job opportunities. The 552 factories are under construction with investments of 1.2 billion pounds and 19.5 thousand job opportunities. The Authority also provides industrial plots, warehouse lands and small workshops.

The industrial activities of the city are: Engineering and electrical industries - food industries - wood and furniture - plastic - paper - yarn and fabric - building materials - metal and mechanical - chemical and pharmaceutical - ready-to-wear - variety.

Bus and Coach Bodybuilders MCV have their factory near the City.

The Green Valley School is a tri-lingual (German-English-Arabic) private school located in Obour city.

== Climate ==
Köppen-Geiger climate classification system classifies its climate as hot desert (BWh), which is very similar to its neighboring area in Cairo and the rest of Egypt.

Climate data for Obour
Month	Jan	Feb	Mar	Apr	May	Jun	Jul	Aug	Sep	Oct	Nov	Dec	Year
Mean daily maximum °C (°F)	18.8 (65.8)	20.7 (69.3)	24 (75)	28.4 (83.1)	32.7 (90.9)	34.8 (94.6)	35.1 (95.2)	34.8 (94.6)	32.3 (90.1)	30.1 (86.2)	25.5 (77.9)	20.6 (69.1)	28.2 (82.7)
Daily mean °C (°F)	13.4 (56.1)	14.6 (58.3)	17.2 (63.0)	20.7 (69.3)	24.6 (76.3)	27.1 (80.8)	27.9 (82.2)	28 (82)	25.9 (78.6)	23.7 (74.7)	19.8 (67.6)	15.1 (59.2)	21.5 (70.7)
Mean daily minimum °C (°F)	8 (46)	8.5 (47.3)	10.5 (50.9)	13.1 (55.6)	16.6 (61.9)	19.5 (67.1)	20.8 (69.4)	21.3 (70.3)	19.5 (67.1)	17.3 (63.1)	14.1 (57.4)	9.6 (49.3)	14.9 (58.8)
Average precipitation mm (inches)	6 (0.2)	3 (0.1)	4 (0.2)	1 (0.0)	0 (0)	0 (0)	0 (0)	0 (0)	0 (0)	1 (0.0)	3 (0.1)	6 (0.2)	24 (0.8)
Source: Climate-Data.org (altitude: 59m)

== See also ==
- Greater Cairo
- 10th of Ramadan
