= El Shorouk =

El Shorouk الشروق
- City
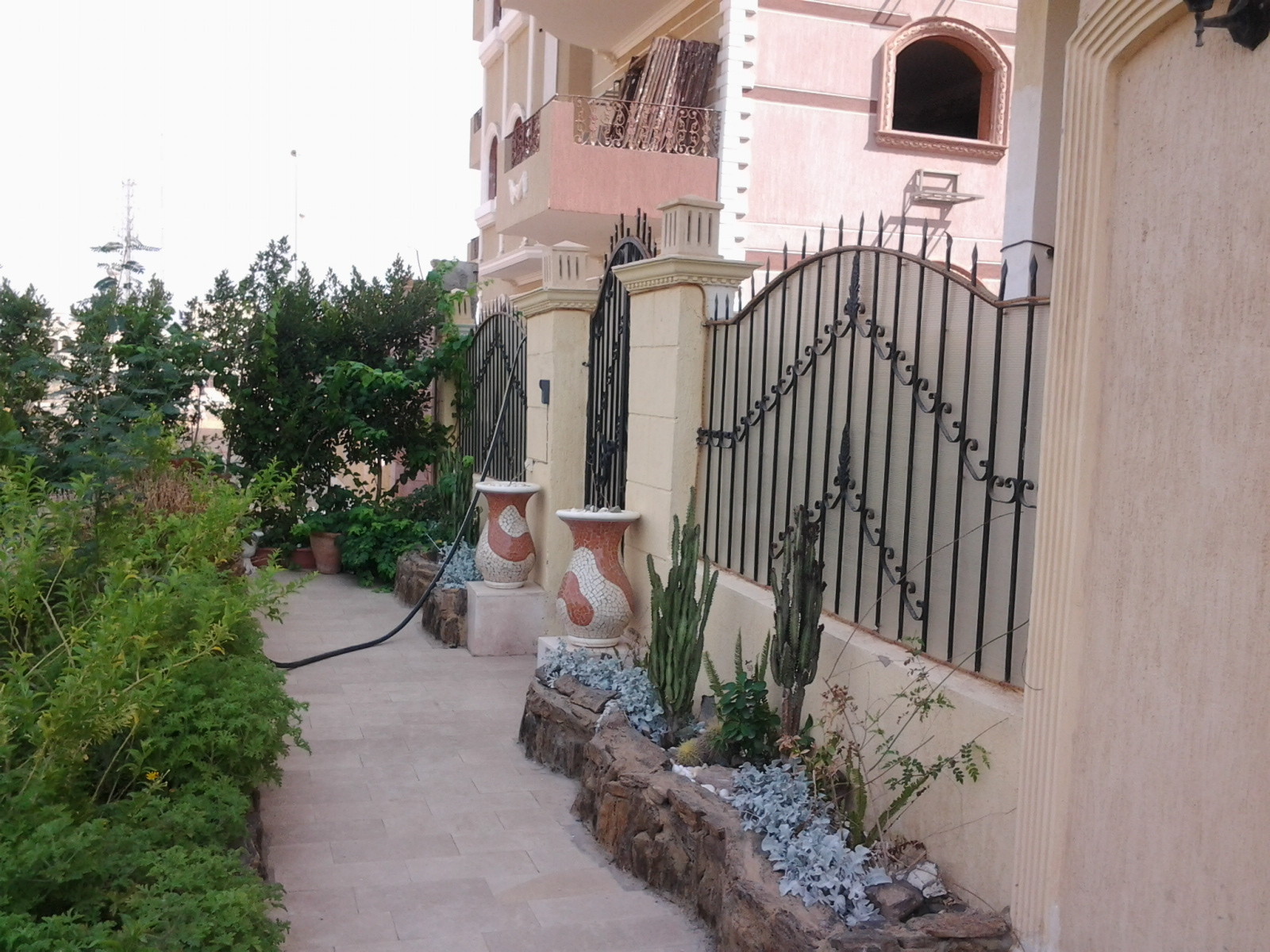
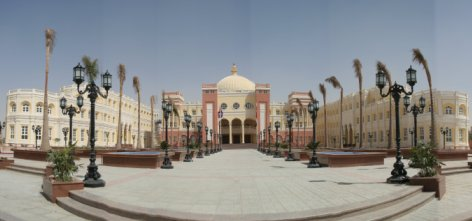
- International Medical Center Residential property The British University in Egypt

- Location in Egypt
- Coordinates: 30.144979°N 31.639912°E
- Country: Egypt
- Governorate: Cairo
- Time zone: UTC+2 (EET)
  - Summer (DST): UTC+3 (EEST)

El-Shorouk (Arabic: الشروق pronounced [eʃʃʊˈɾuːʔ, eʃʃɪˈɾuːʔ], "the Sunrise") is a satellite city in the Eastern Area of Cairo, Egypt, also spelt Elshorouk. El Shorouk is considered as an extension for Heliopolis (Masr El Gedida). The two areas are mostly residential and are characterized by a limited number of malls and projects that would otherwise cause street congestion, unlike Nasr City and New Cairo which attracts investments and has lots of malls causing streets congestion. As a "new city" it is administered by the New Urban Communities Authority (NUCA).

Shorouk is one of the third-generation new cities, established by presidential decree 325/1995, allocating 11,000 acres (4,500 ha) of public land to NUCA, in addition to further allocations totalling 53,000 acres (21,000 ha) by 2017.

== Population ==
The establishment of the city highlights the efforts of the Egyptian state in managing urban expansion to achieve several development goals. One prominent goal being to absorb the expanding population of Egypt and to ease population pressures currently placed on the aging capital. Other major themes of this project are to redistribute the population of the Greater Cairo area and to raise the standard of living in the region through the provision of new job opportunities from industrial projects in the city. By 2030, 35 years after its inception, Shorouk was planned to have a population of

500,000.

However, according to the 2017 census, it had only 87,285 residents. This underachievement is not just in Shorouk, but across the new city programme where cities are planned according to wholly unrealistic population growth rates, and where they are inequitably distributed (by land area) to capture population growth.

== Infrastructure ==
El Shorouk City is primarily residential. The older part of Shorouk is almost fully developed, while the eastern extension is still under development and the western extension remains unplanned. Shorouk has various residential levels from luxurious compounds to middle class apartments and apartments developed by the state. New Heliopolis City covers about 5000 acres from Shorouk’s land and is also still under development. It contains high-end residential compounds such as Sodic East, New Kairo Golf, New Kairo Park, and Talalla.

Shorouk contains several hospitals and medical centers, including the International Medical Center, located at the northern edge of the city along the Ismailia Road.

The city contains multiple schools and universities, including the The British University in Egypt (BUE) and the French University in Egypt (FUE).

== Climate ==
The Köppen-Geiger climate classification system classifies El Shorouk as a hot desert (BWh), as is the rest of Egypt. The climate is generally extremely dry around the capital. In addition to scarce rain, extreme heat during the summer months is a general climate feature of El Shorouk. Though, daytime temperatures are milder during autumn and winter.

Climate data for El Shorouk (altitude: 189m)
Month	Jan	Feb	Mar	Apr	May	Jun	Jul	Aug	Sep	Oct	Nov	Dec	Year
Mean daily maximum °C (°F)	18.2 (64.8)	19.8 (67.6)	23.3 (73.9)	28 (82)	32.3 (90.1)	34.5 (94.1)	35 (95)	34.6 (94.3)	31.9 (89.4)	29.8 (85.6)	25 (77)	20.1 (68.2)	27.7 (81.8)
Daily mean °C (°F)	12.9 (55.2)	13.9 (57.0)	16.7 (62.1)	20.5 (68.9)	24.4 (75.9)	26.9 (80.4)	27.9 (82.2)	27.9 (82.2)	25.5 (77.9)	23.5 (74.3)	19.4 (66.9)	14.7 (58.5)	21.2 (70.1)
Mean daily minimum °C (°F)	7.7 (45.9)	8.1 (46.6)	10.2 (50.4)	13 (55)	16.5 (61.7)	19.4 (66.9)	20.8 (69.4)	21.2 (70.2)	19.2 (66.6)	17.2 (63.0)	13.9 (57.0)	9.4 (48.9)	14.7 (58.5)
Average precipitation mm (inches)	6 (0.2)	4 (0.2)	4 (0.2)	2 (0.1)	0 (0)	0 (0)	0 (0)	0 (0)	0 (0)	1 (0.0)	4 (0.2)	5 (0.2)	26 (1.1)
Source: Climate-Data.org

Climate data for El Shorouk (altitude: 181m)
Month	Jan	Feb	Mar	Apr	May	Jun	Jul	Aug	Sep	Oct	Nov	Dec	Year
Mean daily maximum °C (°F)	18.2 (64.8)	19.9 (67.8)	23.5 (74.3)	28 (82)	32.3 (90.1)	34.5 (94.1)	34.9 (94.8)	34.7 (94.5)	31.9 (89.4)	29.9 (85.8)	25 (77)	20.1 (68.2)	27.7 (81.9)
Daily mean °C (°F)	12.9 (55.2)	14 (57)	16.9 (62.4)	20.4 (68.7)	24.3 (75.7)	27 (81)	27.8 (82.0)	28 (82)	25.5 (77.9)	23.6 (74.5)	19.4 (66.9)	14.7 (58.5)	21.2 (70.1)
Mean daily minimum °C (°F)	7.7 (45.9)	8.2 (46.8)	10.3 (50.5)	12.9 (55.2)	16.4 (61.5)	19.5 (67.1)	20.8 (69.4)	21.3 (70.3)	19.2 (66.6)	17.3 (63.1)	13.9 (57.0)	9.4 (48.9)	14.7 (58.5)
Average precipitation mm (inches)	6 (0.2)	4 (0.2)	4 (0.2)	1 (0.0)	0 (0)	0 (0)	0 (0)	0 (0)	0 (0)	1 (0.0)	4 (0.2)	5 (0.2)	25 (1)
Source: Climate-Data.org

== See also ==
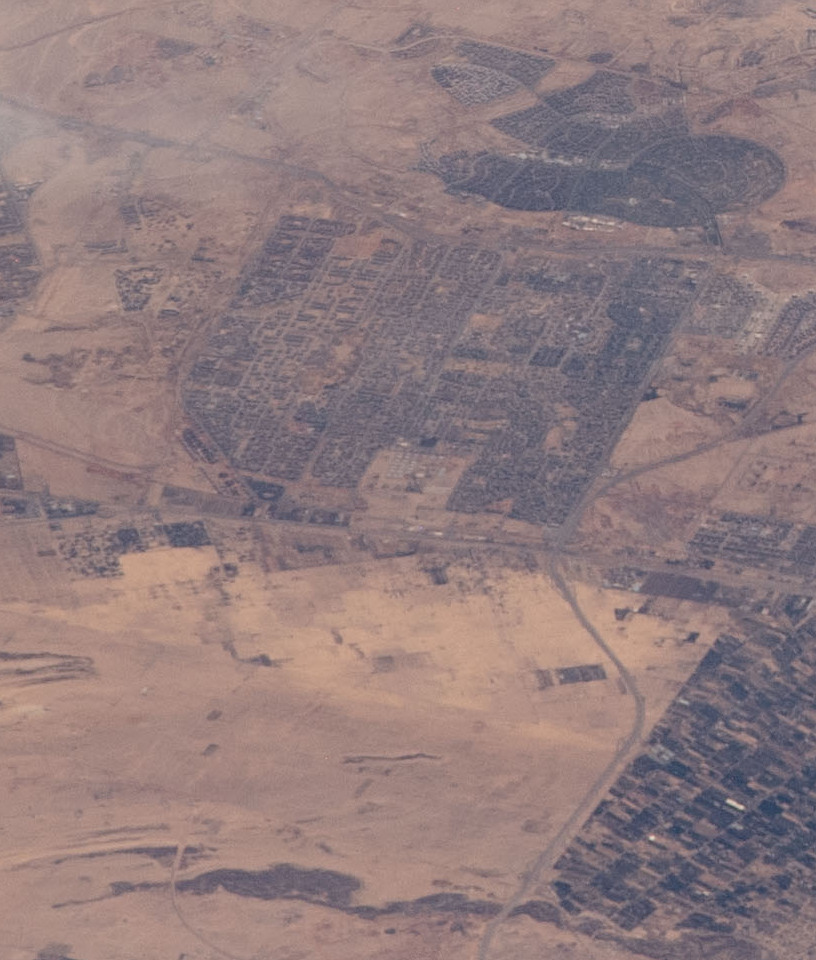
Madinaty and El Shorouq

- New Heliopolis
- New Urban Communities Authority
- Satellite city
- Badr
- New Cairo
