= Garden City, Cairo =

Residential-administrative district in Central Cairo

Coordinates: 30°02′07″N 31°13′52″E

Garden City from the Nile.

Garden City (Arabic: جاردن سيتي) is an early-20th-century real estate development loosely based on the English garden city movement, and is today a mixed residential and administrative quarter in qism Qasr al-Nil in the West District of Cairo, Egypt. It spans the east side of the Nile just south of Wust al-Balad (downtown) and the famous Midan Tahrir (Tahrir Square), and north of Old Cairo. Two main streets, Qasr al-Ayni Street on the east and the Nile Corniche on the west, delineate its eastern and western borders. Garden City is known for its quiet, upscale, and secure atmosphere. The United States, British, Italian and more Embassies are located there.

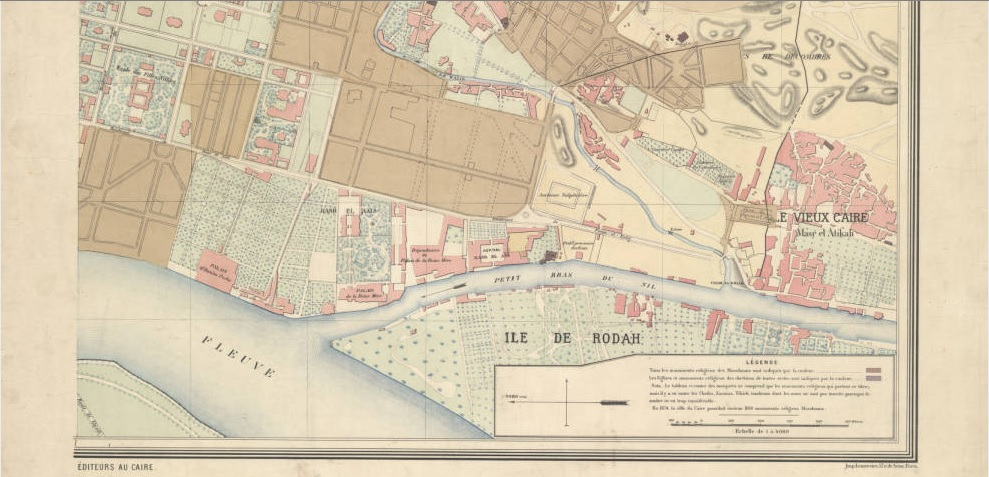
Garden City neighborhood before development

Map of Garden City, 1915

== Administrative status and population ==
Strictly speaking, the original Garden City development is a quarter (shiakha) in qism Qasr al-Nil, though its name also encompasses the Qasr al-Dubara shiakha between it and the Ismailia shiakha to their north that holds the famous Tahrir (former Ismailia) Square.

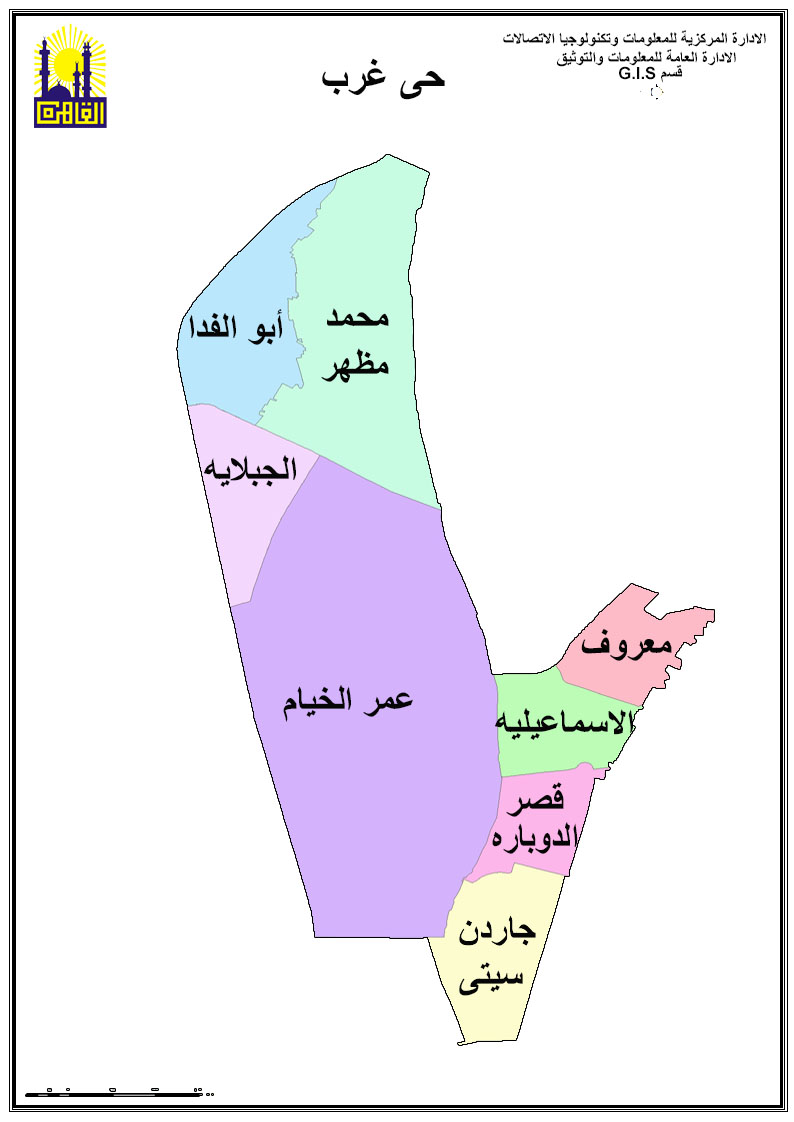
Administrative map of the West District (Hayy Gharb) of Cairo.

In 2017 Garden City had 5217 residents, making it the most populous shiakha in qism Qasr al-Nil.

| Shiakha | Code 2017 | Population |
|---|---|---|
| Gârdin Sitî (Garden City) | 011702 | 5217 |
| Ismâ`îliyya, al- (Ismaïlia) | 011701 | 1026 |
| Ma`rûf | 011704 | 3727 |
| Qaṣr al-Dûbâra | 011703 | 593 |

== History ==
As the Nile's course shifted west away from medieval Cairo, the areas it left behind became swampy plains. During Mohammed Ali's reign in the first half of the 19th century, the area was reclaimed with the swamps filled in and the sandy mounds of Tal al-Akareb (Scorpions Hill) were transformed into orchards and bean fields. Within decades they became royal domain land where a number of palaces were built overlooking the Nile: Kasr al-Dubara for Mohamed Ali's son Ibrahim Pasha, and Kasr al-Aaly (High Palace) for Khedive Ismail's mother.

== Description ==
Garden City, in addition to Zamalek, Maadi, Mohandessin, and Heliopolis, is one of the wealthy residential districts in Greater Cairo. Garden City was developed differently from most of the other neighborhoods and districts in Cairo. It was planned by private investors as opposed to the natural development of cities characterized by the disorganized migration of people. Its landscape, street layout, architecture, and general atmosphere can be explained by both the nature of its founders and Khedive Ismail's attempts to Europeanize Cairo. Garden City was a city strictly planned by private investors wishing to escape the period of national construction that took place until 1952. Its quiet, tree-lined streets, beautiful gardens, and elegant, ornamental palaces coupled with the proximity to the American and British embassies make it an attractive place for affluent Cairenes and tourists. Furthermore, the geography and landscape more closely resemble a lofty, European village. In line with the European feel of the district, Italian architect Beyerly designed the palace. Garden City was modeled after an English garden suburb meant to radiate tranquility and security. Its winding, leafy streets often intersect with each other multiple times and graceful palaces and lofty mansions line the streets next to modern banks and other professional buildings. From the 1880s to the early 1900s, Egyptians from the older neighborhoods flocked to the trendier, up-and-coming parts of the city including Garden City and during the British occupation of Egypt. After 1952, there was a movement in direct response to the period of nationalist construction that took place throughout Egypt. Its European architecture, breezy roads, palm-tree lined streets, and proximity to downtown were contributing factors for a perfect location for the professional elite, like doctors and lawyers, desiring a peaceful lifestyle that differed from many other parts of Cairo where they could still be in the scene (bordering downtown Cairo, Tahrir Square) but live more luxuriously.

== Role in the Egyptian Revolution ==
For the most part, the low-key atmosphere of Garden City and collection of wealthy residents meant that Garden City was not politically active during the Egyptian Revolution so-called Arabic Spring. In fact, throughout the majority of political and technological upheaval throughout Cairo, Garden City managed to maintain its chic first class appearance. On September 11, 2012, Egyptian protesters, in retaliation of the video ridiculing Muhammad, stormed the US embassy and staged revolts. However, in anticipation of the anniversary of 9/11, most employees had already gone home and so very few were actually inside the building at the time. This security breach highlights the lack of immediately responsive military forces in Garden City, an area known for its peace and quiet. Furthermore, despite the relative low-key atmosphere, there were reports of thug violence in March 2013 which did not last long after. Garden City residents reported that bullies set up blockades on certain streets at night, stopping cars and demanding money. If the car's inhabitants did not pay the 500 Egyptian pounds, the bullies would damage the cars. This also is a huge downfall in the tranquil reputation of Garden City and its paradise-esque rows of breezy, tree-lined streets. Later through the years, the tranquility and peace through the country returned making Garden City and neighborhoods alike safe again and even more tranquil.

== Landmarks ==
- Nile Corniche
- Qasr al-Ayni Street
- Belmont Building

== See also ==
- Pallache family
