= Qasr El Eyni Street =

Street in Egypt

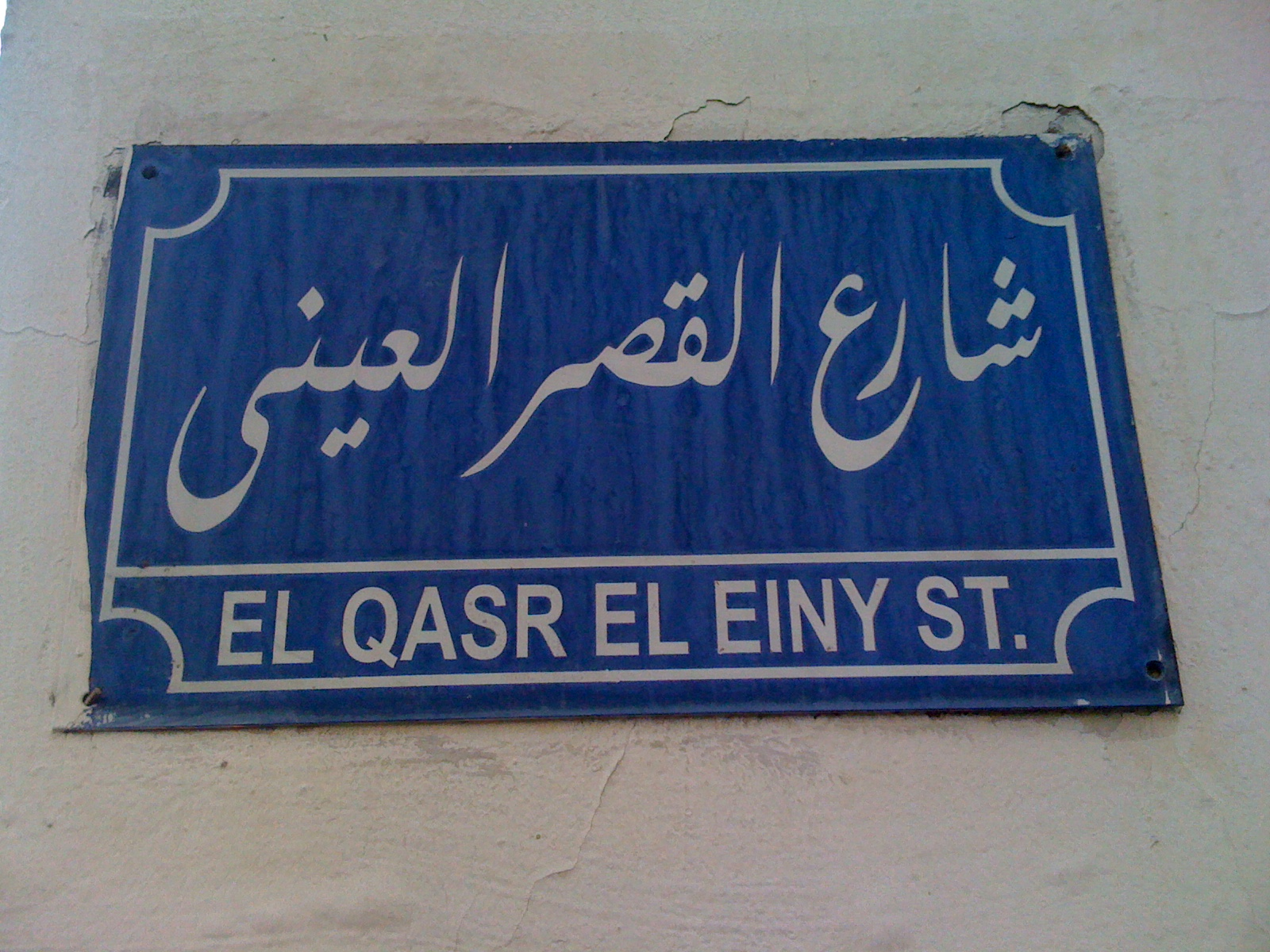

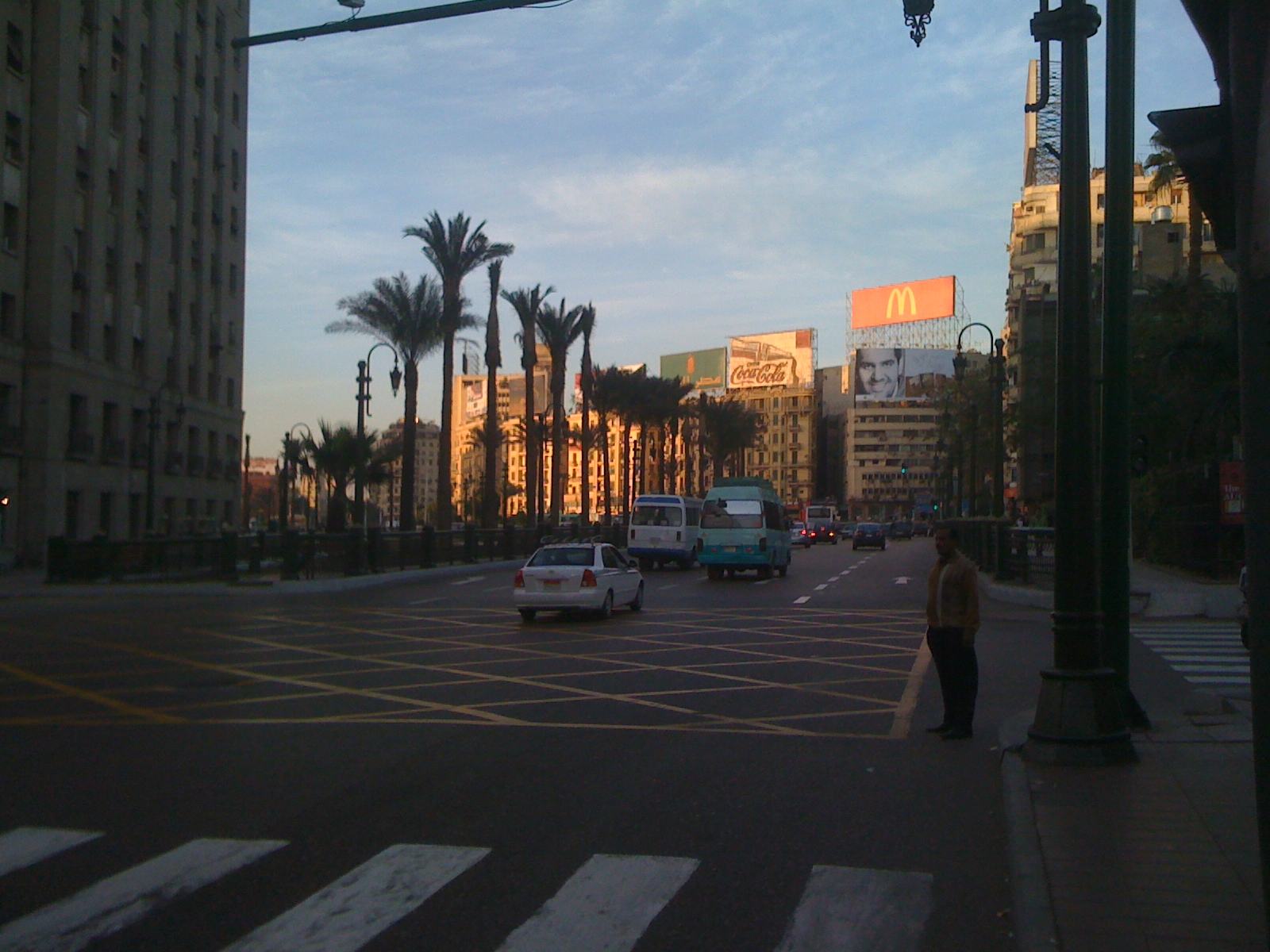
View of Tahrir Square from Qasr El Einy Street.

Qasr al-Ayni Street or Qasr Eleini Street (Arabic: شارع قصر العينى, spoken Shāriʿ Aṣr el-Einī; translated as Palace of Eleini Street) is one of the oldest streets in downtown Cairo, Egypt.

== Namesake ==
Asr Eleini (Egyptian for Palace of Eleini) owes its name to the nearby landmark of the same name, Eleini's Palace Hospital, which now hosts the oldest ever medical school in the Middle East and Africa. The street has an outlet into Tahrir Square.

== Location and history ==
Qasr El Einy Street is located in downtown Cairo, running parallel to the Cairo Metro Line 1, spanning El Malek El Saleh, El Sayeda Zeinab, Saad Zaghloul and Sadat stations along its length. The street runs NNE from the National Cancer Institute to Tahrir Square, a distance of 2.4 kilometres (1.5 miles). Tahrir Square was built in the late 1860s, around the Khairy Pasha Palace, which later hosted the American University in Cairo's campus, built in the 1920s.

Tahrir Square

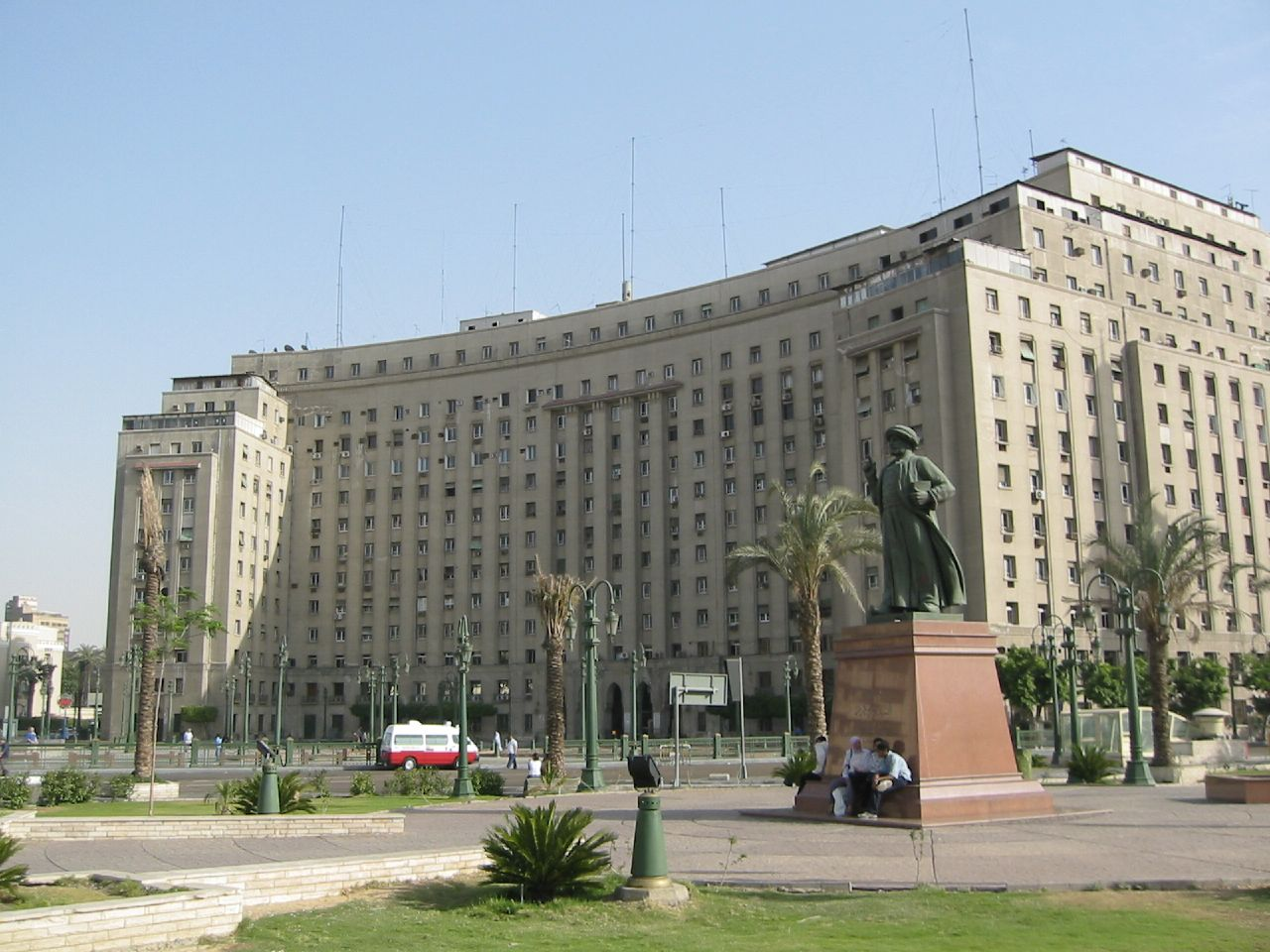
Tahrir Square with the Mogamma building, Qasr El Eyni Street begins to the left.

The Metro's Sadat Station serves Tahrir Square, providing links to Giza, Helwan, Maadi, and other districts and suburbs of Greater Cairo. The area around Tahrir Square includes the Egyptian Museum, the Headquarters of the Arab League building, the Mogamma government building, the original downtown campus of the American University in Cairo, the Nile Hotel, and used to host the National Democratic Party headquarters building until it was demolished in the aftermath of the Egyptian revolution of 2011.

Tahrir Square has been the site for numerous major protests and demonstrations, including in March 2003 when people came out to protest the War in Iraq, and the 2011 Egyptian protest gatherings. Tahrir Square was originally called "Ismailia Square", named after 19th-century ruler Khedive Ismail, but the name was changed to Tahrir Square after the Egyptian Revolution of 1952.

Parliament Building

The parliament building that houses Egypt's legislative body, the House of Representatives, is located on the Qasr El Einy Street. In 2008, the building was severely damaged by a fire.

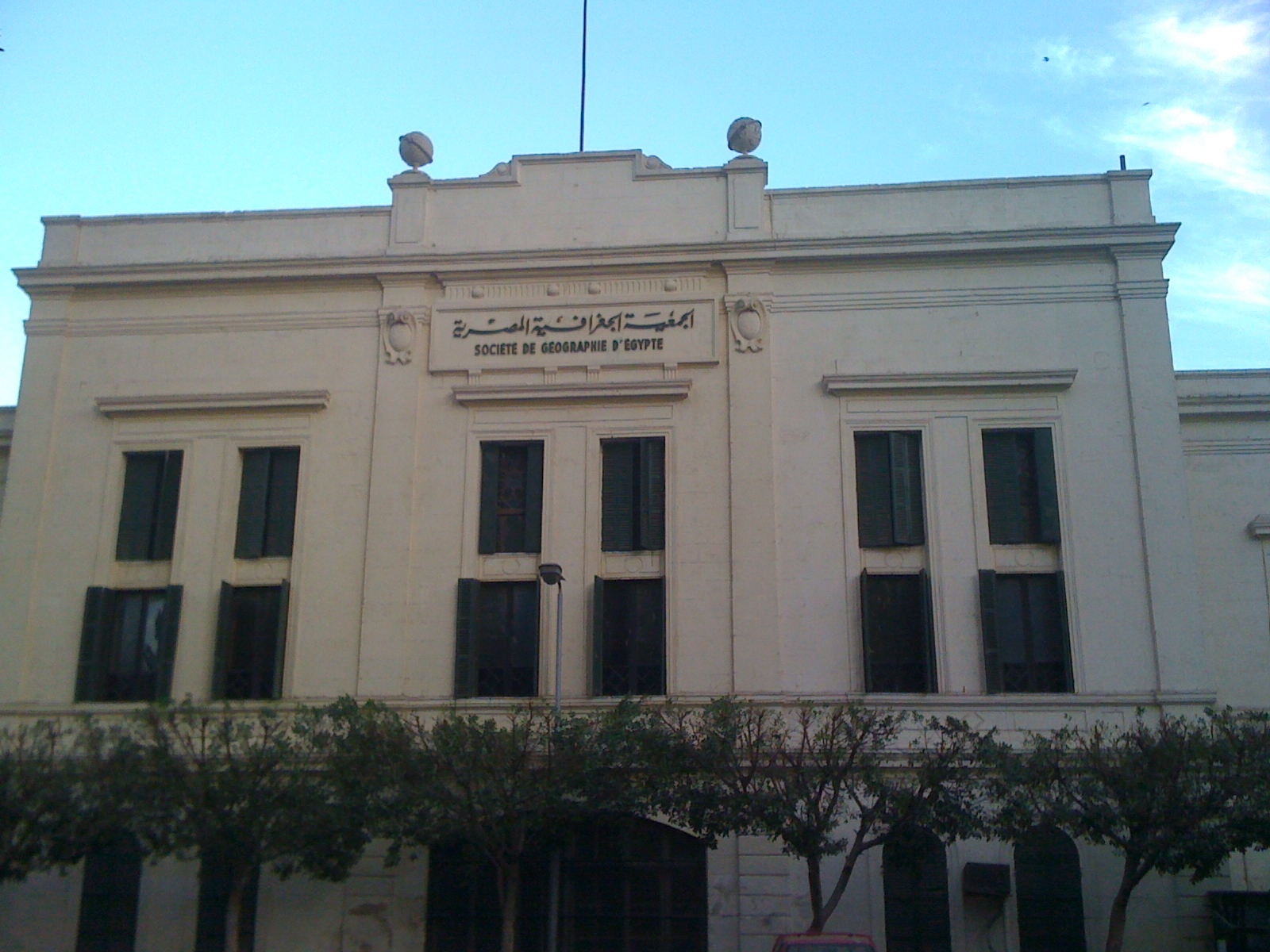
Egyptian Geographic Society.

The Egyptian Geographic Society

The Egyptian Geographic Society (Arabic: الجمعية الجغرافية المصرية, French: Société de Géographie d'Egypte) was established by a decree of Khedive Isma'il Pasha on 19 May 1875. Its first president was the German botanist, traveller and ethnologist Georg August Schweinfurth. Founded as the Khedivial Society of Geography, its name was modified several times in order to reflect Egypt's changing political status. It acquired its current name following the Egyptian Revolution of 1952.

Egyptian Ethnological Museum

This museum houses exhibits covering the activities and traditions in Cairo including village crafts, costumes, equipment and other items of daily life. The museum is located at the Geographical Society Building on Qasr El-Einy Street.

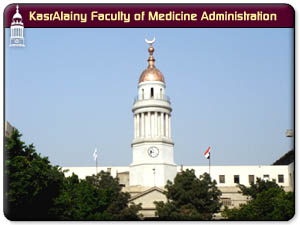
Cairo University Hospital—Qasr El Einy Hospital, with its famous clocktower on Qasr El Einy Street.

Cairo University Hospital—Qasr El Einy Hospital

The Qasr El Einy Medical School (Arabic: قصر العيني) is part of the Cairo University School of Medicine, and is located in Garden City district in downtown Cairo. Qasr El Eyni Medical School is one of the largest, oldest, and most prestigious medical schools in Africa and the Middle East. Along with the Cairo University Hospitals, it is considered the largest medical institution in the Middle East, and probably one of the largest in the world. Established in 1827, it was named after El Einy Pasha, whose palace was originally the school's main building. It accepts about 1600 students annually out of the thousands of applicants who apply. The students are chosen by a computer program based on the score they have achieved in high school. It provides a six-year combined premedical-medical programme leading to a MBBCh which is usually followed by a one-year internship at the university hospital.

Qasr El Einy is considered a symbol of the medical profession in Egypt. Hence, the founding date of Qasr El Einy, March 11, 1827, was chosen as the day of the annual festival for the Egyptian medical profession.

== Today ==
Located in the center of downtown Cairo, Qasr El Einy Street has a range of buildings including apartment complexes, banks, churches, gas stations, government buildings, hospitals, internet cafes, mosques, pharmacies, and numerous shops and restaurants. Qasr El Einy Street is a one-way street that heads directly towards Tahrir Square with no intersections, 18-20 side streets, and occasional bus stops.

== Major institutions and buildings ==
Qasr El-Einy Street has many notable institutions, buildings, and landmarks. Listed southeastward from its Tahrir Square terminus they include:

1. AUC—American University in Cairo Bookstore (and original AUC Campus, now AUC downtown campus)
2. The Mogamma
3. The Principal Bank for Development and Agriculture
4. The Society for Egyptian Geography
5. The Egyptian Ethnological Museum
6. Ministry of Transport (General Authority of Roads, Bridges, and Land Transport)
7. House of Representatives
8. Ministry of Social Solidarity
9. Cairo University Hospital—Qasr El Einy Hospital
10. Cairo University College of Pharmacy
11. Moustapha Fahmy Bay's "Faisal Nada Theater" (1931)
12. Cairo Medical Syndicate
13. National Herpetology and Tropical Medicine and Research Institute

== Adjacent and nearby sites ==
Mugamma

Mugamma (alternatively the Mogamma), literary meaning ‘combined,’ is Egypt's government office complex located adjacent to Qasr El Eyni Street on the south side of Tahrir Square, where much of the government paperwork is done. It's a Soviet-era gray concrete, massive twenty-story building. The interior has narrow hallways, unlabeled doors to the many government agencies located in this one building. The agencies in the building include: the Fire Fighting Organization; the Tax Evasion Investigations Offices; the Passport Offices; and the High Committee for Sports and Youth. This is where people go to get a marriage license, a driver's license, and most any other necessary license. If one needs to transact with the Egyptian government on public business of most kinds, the Mogamma is where it is transpires.

The Egyptian Museum

The Egyptian Museum — officially the Museum of Egyptian Antiquities, and commonly referred to as the "Cairo Museum" — on the northern side of Tahrir Square is one of the world's archaeology and ancient art museums. The building holds a collection of Egyptian antiquities, with at least 136,000 items on display. Hundreds of thousands of additional items are in the museum's basement storerooms and elsewhere, and are added to each year with ongoing archaeological excavation discoveries.

== Gallery ==
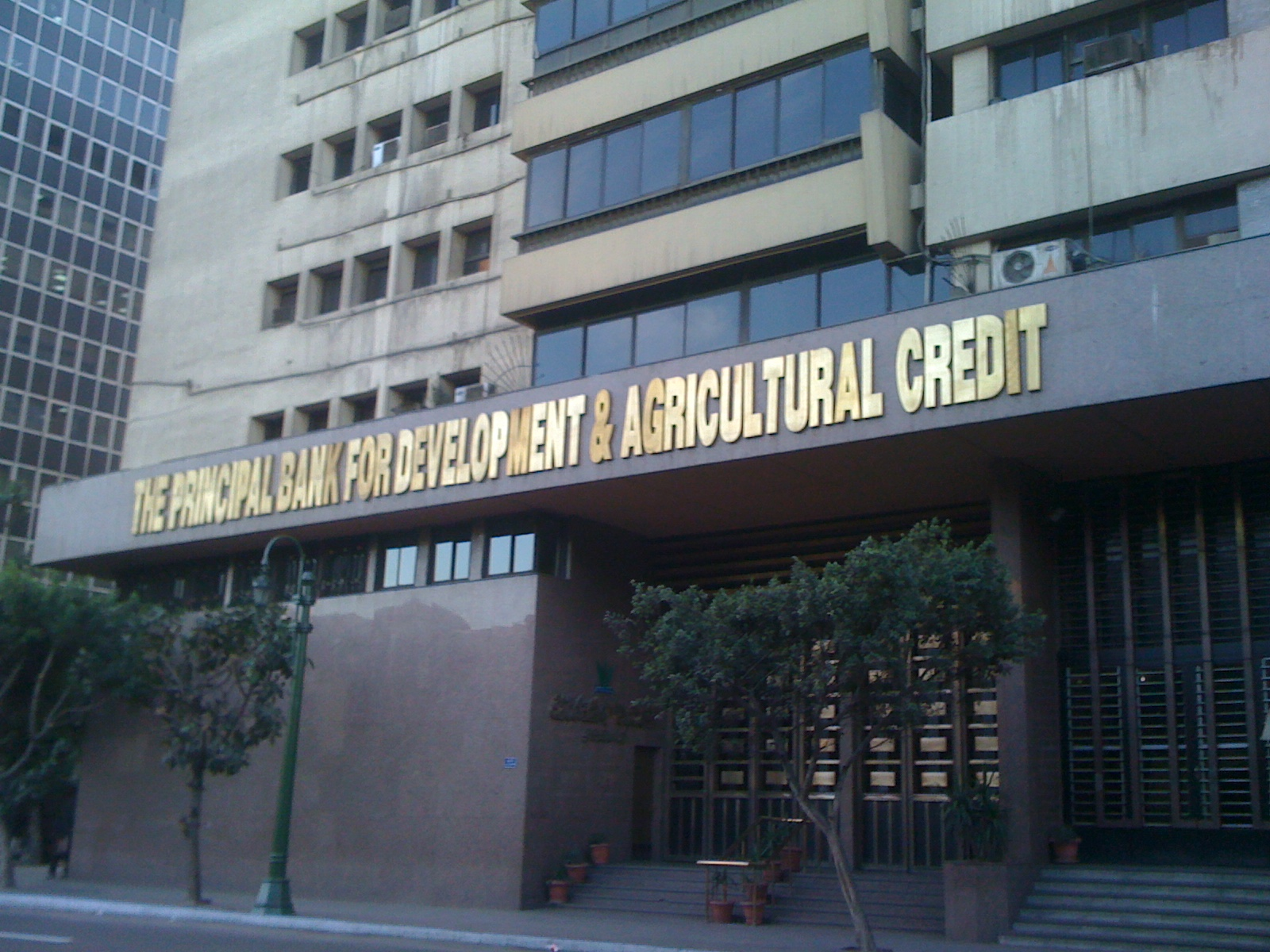
The Principal Bank of Development and Agriculture on Qasr El Einy Street

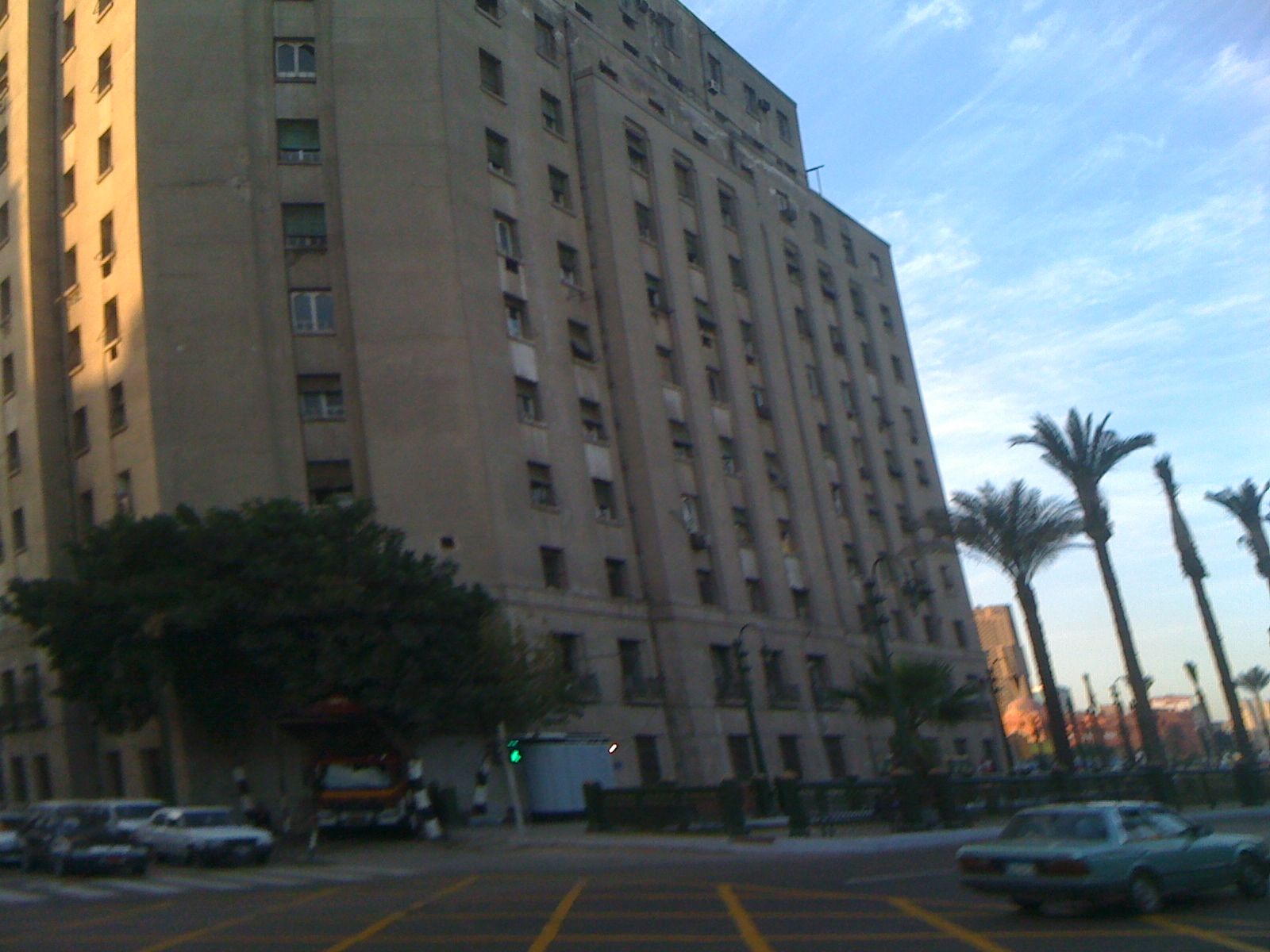
Side view of the Gomhoriya on Qasr El Einy Street

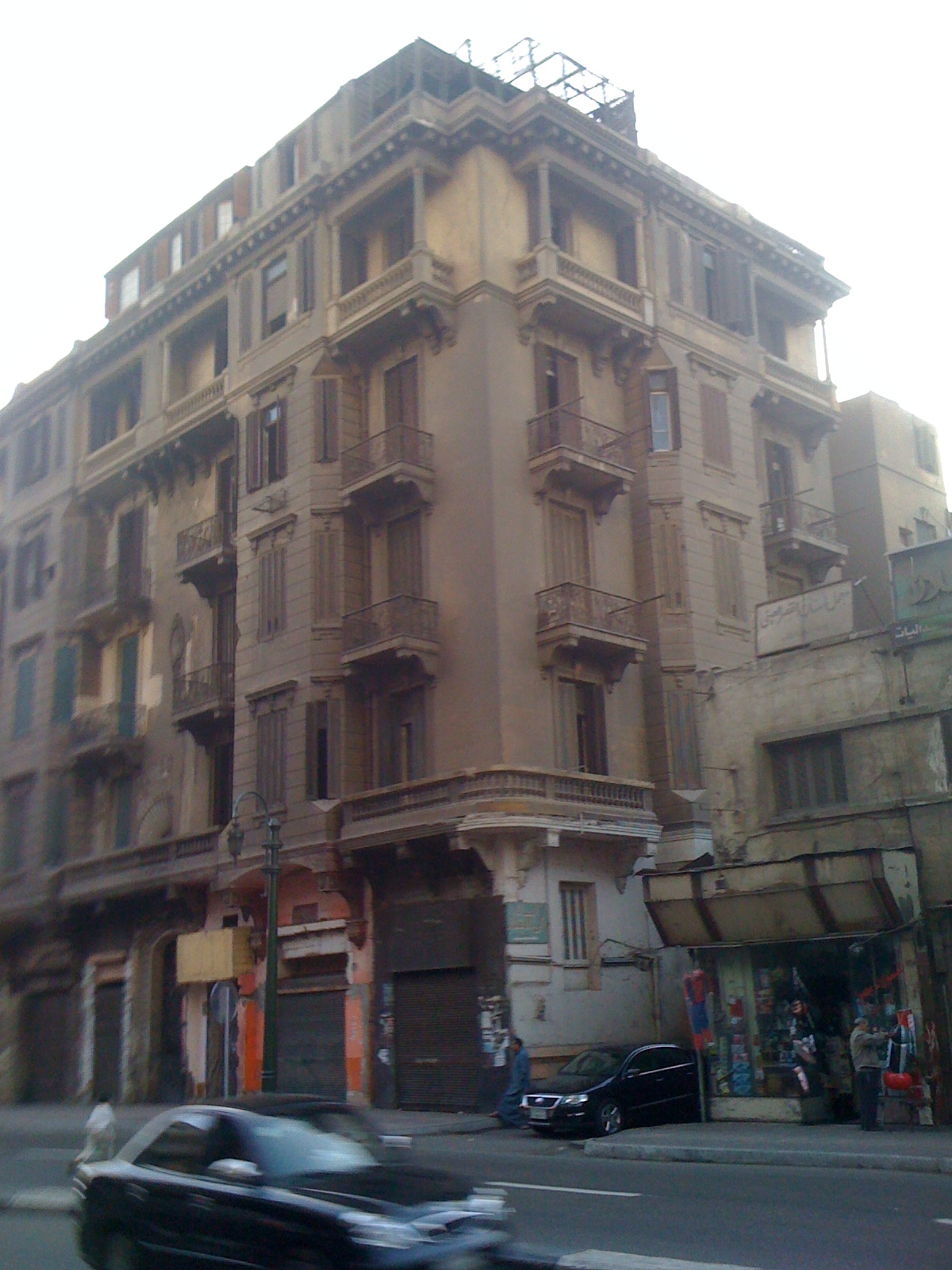
Muhammad Bey Architecture on Qasr El Einy Street

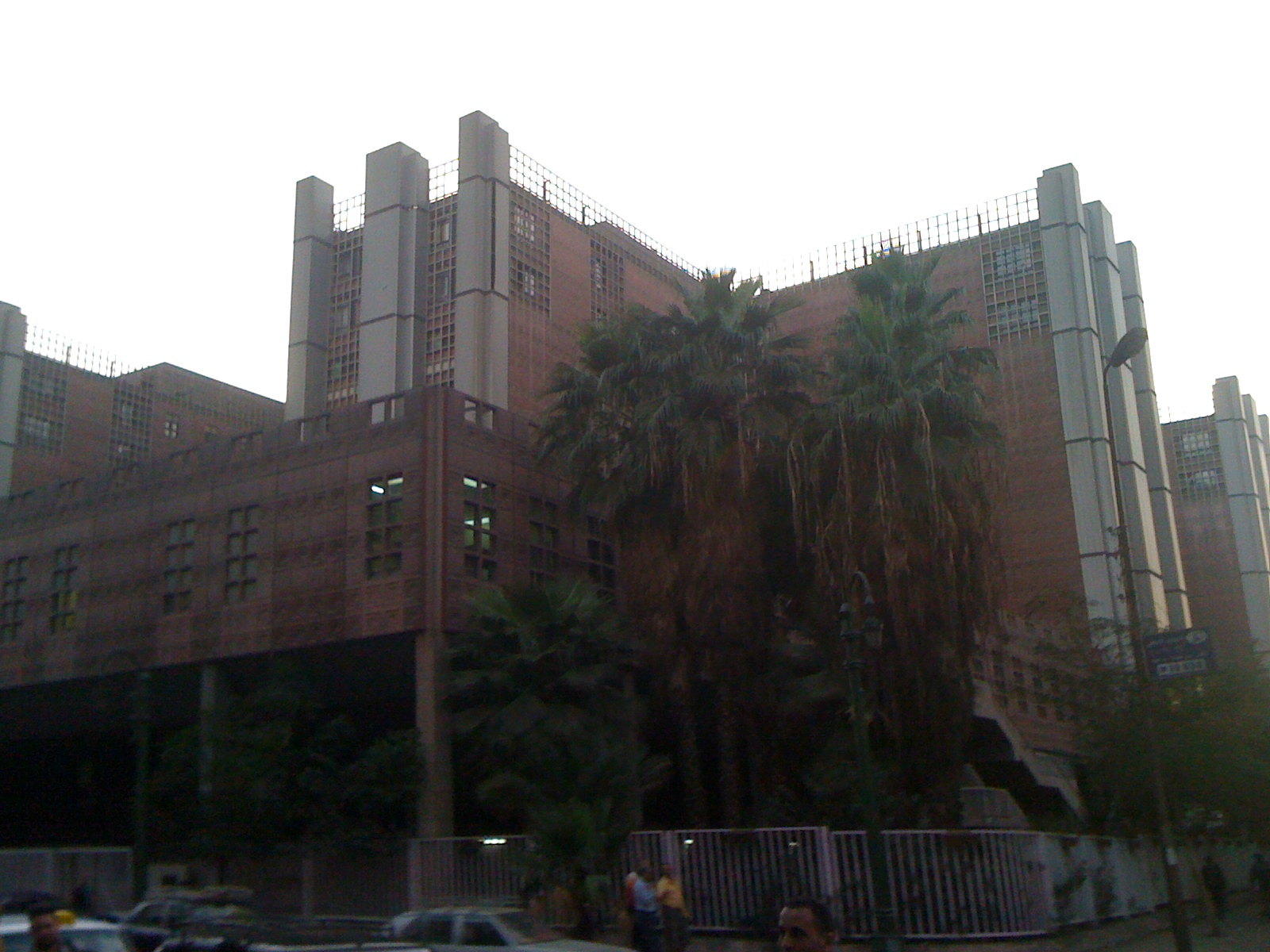
Cairo University Hospital

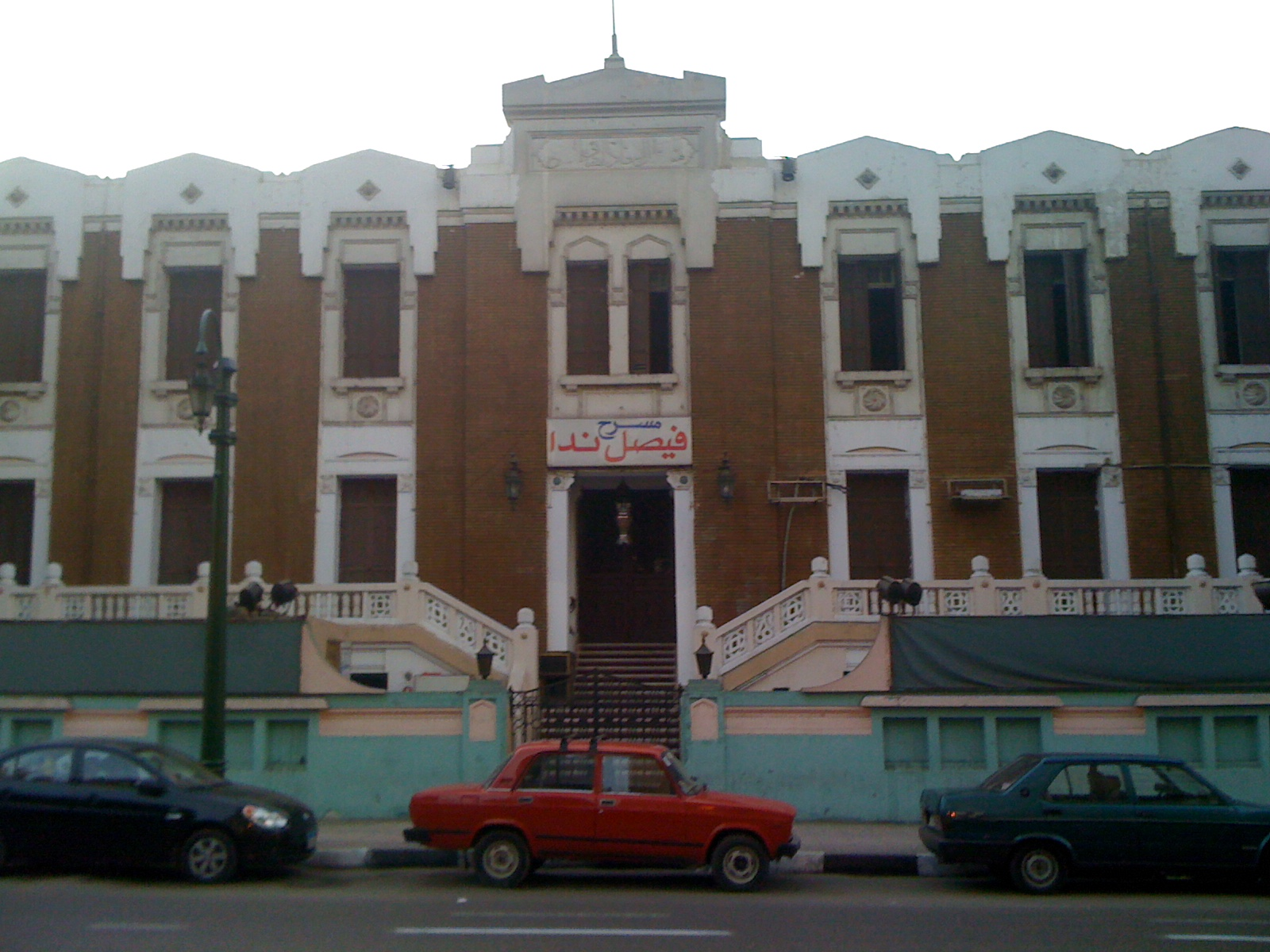
Moustapha Fahmy Bey's Theater (1931)

== See also ==
- Al-Azhar University
- Mustafa Kamel Square
- Khan el-Khalili
- Muizz Street
- Saliba Street
