= Khairy Pasha Palace =

Neo-Mameluk building in Cairo, Egypt

Coordinates: 30°02′34″N 31°14′14″E

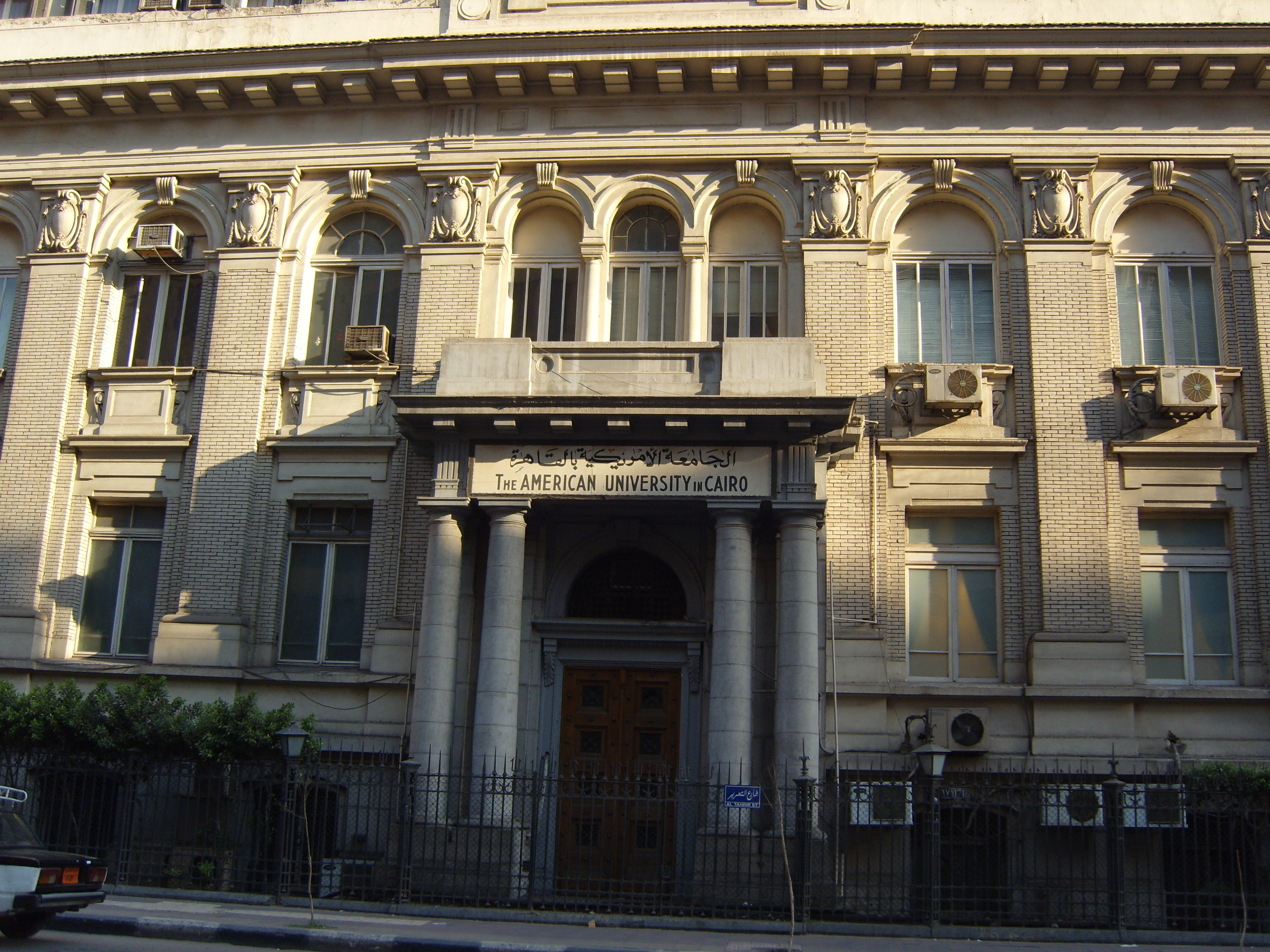
Tahrir Square (Downtown Campus)

Khairy Pasha Palace is a neo-Mamluk building and former palace of Khairy Pasha, located on 113 Qasr El Eyni Street, in Tahrir Square, Cairo. It served as the American University in Cairo's Tahrir Square campus (AUC Downtown) since 1920 until 2008 when the new campus was inaugurated in New Cairo (AUC New Cairo). The building in the photograph on the right was originally the Girls' School of the Greek Community of Cairo. In 1964 it was sold to the AUC and served as the Greek Campus.

== History ==
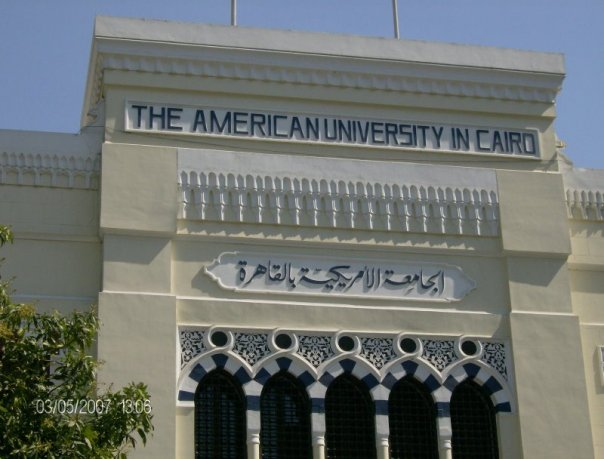
American University in Cairo, Tahrir Square Campus at Khairy Pasha Palace.

=== Khairy Pasha ===
The Khairy Pasha Palace was built in the 1860s by Khairy Pasha, Minister of Education in the Khedivate of Egypt. The residence was part of the early development of a new Downtown Cairo district, north of the historical commercial and government centers of Old Cairo and the Cairo Citadel that were the city's core for centuries and millennia. It was designed the neo-Mameluk style, and the completed tall and striking mediaeval Islamic faux crenelated palace inspired a regional design style. Its Mamluk mediaeval Egyptian revival style, along with Moorish Revival and other traditions of Islamic Revival architecture, were integrated with European Beaux-Arts, Second Empire, and Art Nouveau style influences were used throughout modernizing Cairo in creating the vision of the 19th-century ruler Khedive Ismail, who commissioned the new downtown district's 'Paris on the Nile' design.

=== American University in Cairo ===
The building briefly became the headquarters of the Egyptian University in the early 1900s, now Cairo University in Giza. The Khairy building was acquired by the American Mission in Egypt in 1919, and opened as the original 1920 American University at Cairo campus structure in downtown Cairo. It was dedicated to being a center for the cultural enrichment and modernization of Egypt.

In 2008 the AUC relocated its undergraduate and graduate programs to the new 'AUC New Cairo Campus' in New Cairo, a new 2001 satellite city around 20 kilometres (12 mi) east of the 'AUC Downtown' campus. The university's continuing education programs remained at the 7.8 acres (32,000 m^{2}) 'AUC Downtown' with the main building still the converted Khairy Pasha palace.

== See also ==
- Qasr El Eyni Street
- Talaat Harb Street
