= Headquarters of the Arab League =

Coordinates: 30°02′39″N 31°14′05″E

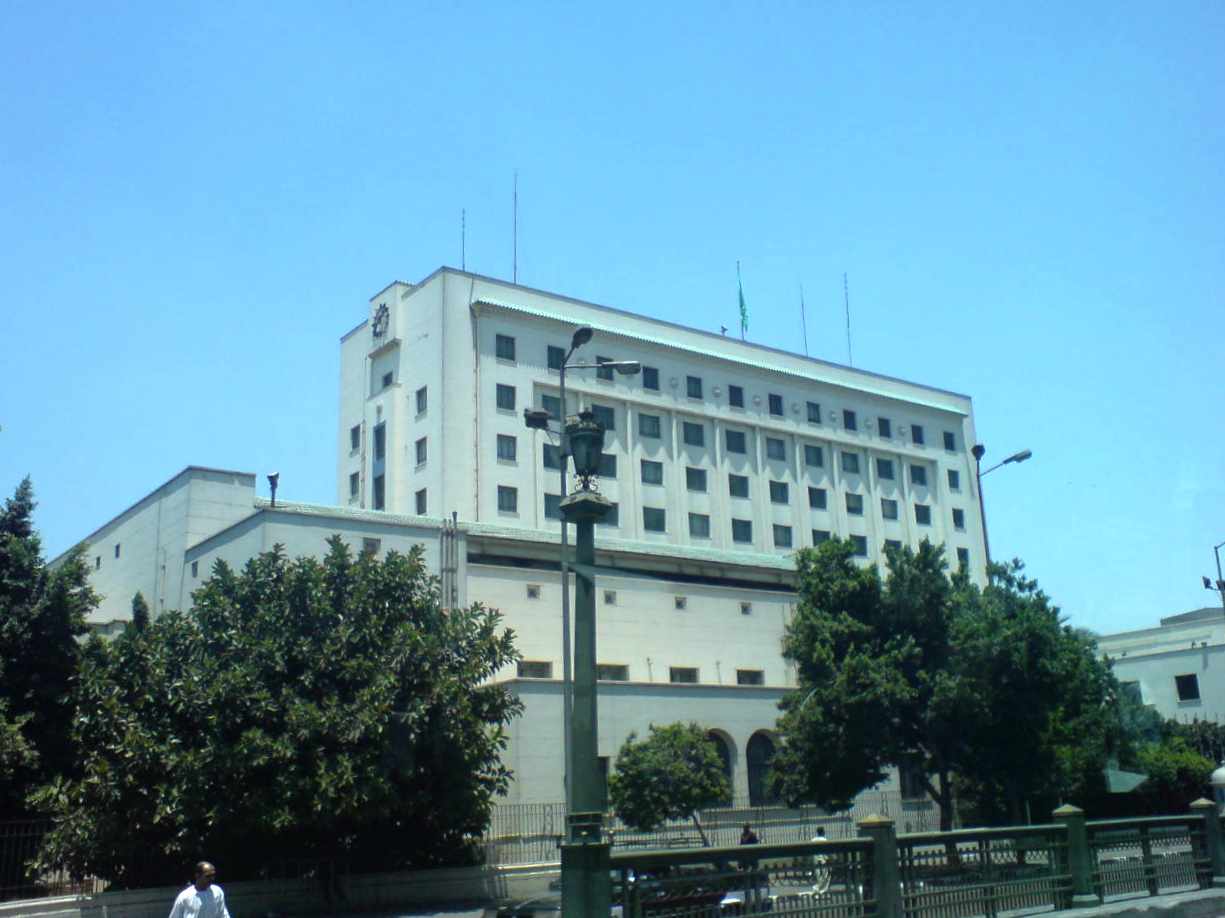
Headquarters of the Arab League, beside Tahrir Square in Downtown Cairo.

The Headquarters of the Arab League is located in Tahrir Square and near the downtown business district of Cairo, Egypt. The headquarters building has views of the Nile River and Qasr al-Nil Bridge just to the west.

== Arab League ==
The headquarters witnessed the foundation of the Arab League, and the first summit held at these headquarters occurred in 1964 with Gamal Abdel Nasser. The grounds include an enormous hall with a round table for summits, currently used for the Arab temporary parliamentary sessions. It was also used for Arab Minister summits during the Israeli-Lebanese crisis of 2006.

== Local landmarks ==
Located on Al-Tahrir Street beside Tahrir Square, the Arab League headquarters are close by are diplomatic landmarks and places of cultural interest including: the Egyptian Foreign Ministry, Egyptian Museum, Cairo Opera House, and the Cairo Tower.

== See also ==
- History of the Arab League
