= The Mogamma =

Coordinates: 30°2′35.1794″N 31°14′5.98″E

Mogamma el Tahrir
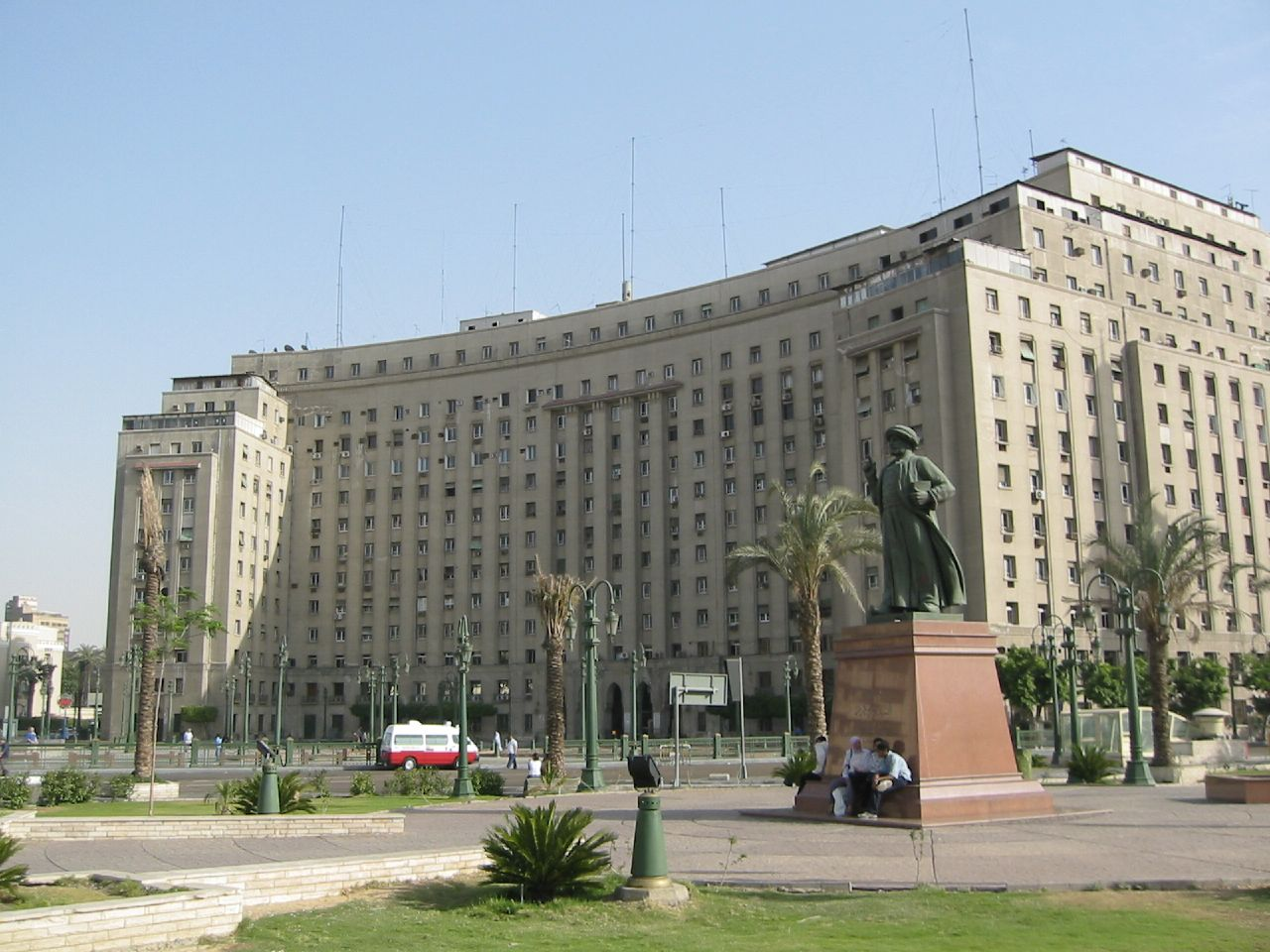
- The Mogamma on Tahrir Square, Cairo

General information
- Location: Cairo, Egypt
- Completed: 1949
- Owner: The Sovereign Fund of Egypt

Mogamma el Tahrir (Arabic: مجمع التحرير English translation: Tahrir Complex ) is a government building in Cairo, Egypt. The Mogamma was the result of a series of master plans for Esamailiyya Square (now Tahrir Square), which used to be occupied by the British barracks. In 1945 when King Farouk ordered the demolition of the barracks upon the departure of British troops from the area, a series of urban planning proposals ensued.

The idea for a centralised, all-in-one administrative building emerged from the 1945 plans. Construction began in 1946, and ended in 1949. The building's style reflects typical 1940s modernism, and government buildings in the same style can be found in Buffalo, New York (Buffalo City Hall), and Paris. Contrary to popular belief, there is no Soviet association or inspiration, and the building was not constructed by the government of Egypt's second President, Gamal Abdel Nasser. Indeed, Nasser did not become the president of Egypt until November 1954, several years after the building was completed.

The Mogamma is located in downtown Cairo to the south of Tahrir Square, which was, at the time, the newly designed "Liberation Square".

In 2021, the Egyptian government vacated the building and it was announced that it will be rebuilt at a cost of $200 million as a luxury hotel called CairoHouse by the Chicago-based Oxford Capital Group, Global Ventures Group, and UAE-based Al Otaiba Investments.

== Function ==
The Mogamma was used as an administrative governmental building, handling the paperwork of government agencies. For example, one would go there to process documents, get a driver's license, or be issued a visa. The governmental agencies that were located in the building included the Tax Evasion Investigations Offices, the Fire Fighting Organization, and the Passport Offices. The 14-story building was the workplace of 18,000–30,000 Egyptian public servants.

== Structure and architecture ==
The building was designed by Egyptian architect Mohamed Kamal Ismail, who also designed the High Court of Egypt's building, and planned the expansion of the Great Mosque of Mecca and Al-Masjid an-Nabawi in Saudi Arabia. The building was built in Modern Architectural Style, with little attention to the facade's ornamentation, and more focus on its practicality, as the building was planned to - at the time - house around 4,000 employees.

== The Mogamma in cinema ==
The Mogamma has appeared in several Egyptian movies, the most famous one being el Erhab w el Kabab ( Terrorism and Kebab) (1992), a comedy in which the building's bureaucracy frustrates an Egyptian citizen to the point that he mistakenly grabs a guard's gun, proceeds to take the building hostage, and is labeled a terrorist. The film uses the Mogamma and unbearable bureaucracy as a metaphor for all that is wrong in Egyptian society.

== The Mogamma today ==
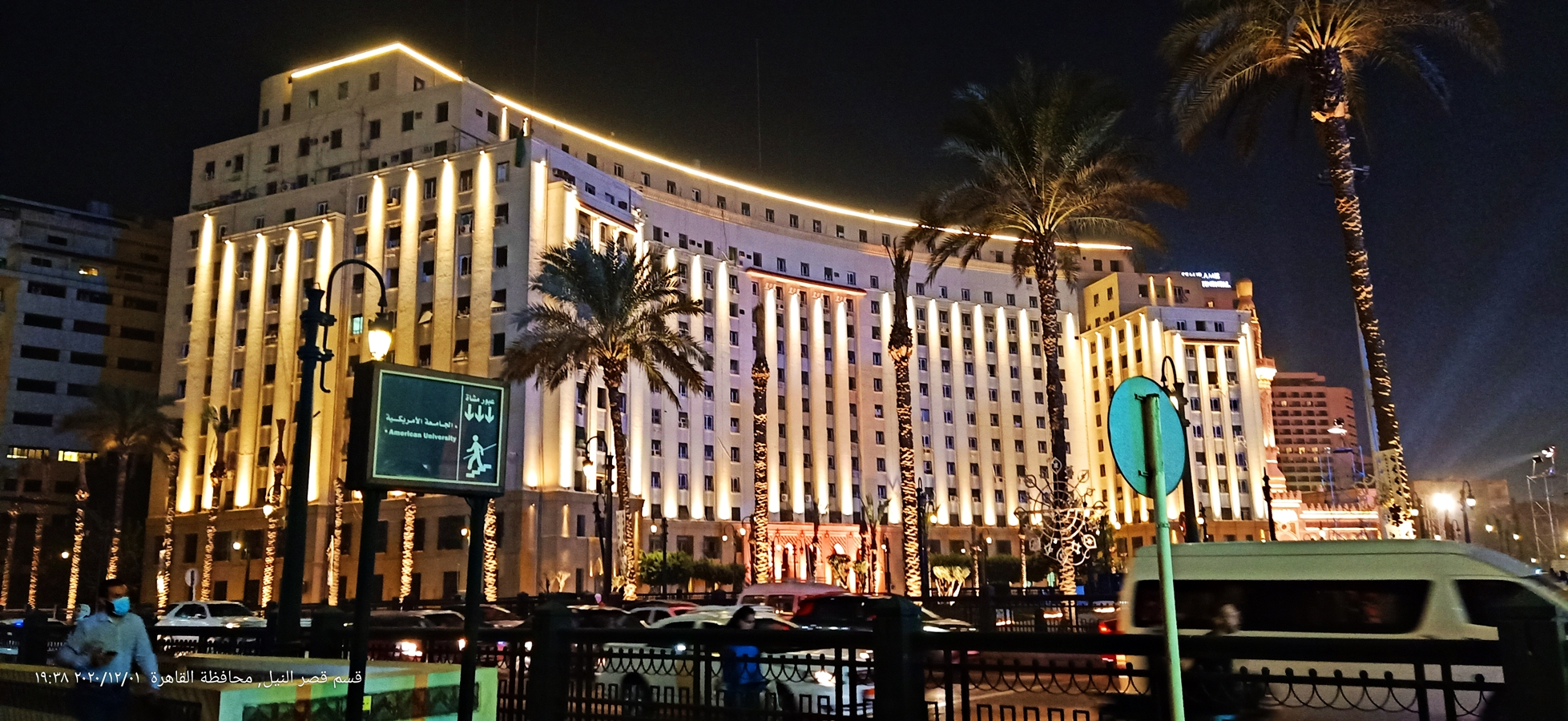
The Mogamma building in Tahrir Square as seen in 2020

In 2005, the government indicated it had plans for the government administrative buildings and departments to be moved from their present locations in and around the downtown area to someplace else. In 2016, the government announced its plan to reduce congestion in the Downtown Cairo area, a plan that focuses primarily on the Mogamma, which is believed to have created and contributed to the enormous amount of congestion in Tahrir Square. The administrative offices inside the building are to be emptied and transferred elsewhere outside the downtown area, but while the government set the date for the evacuation of the building to be in mid-2017, the deadline has not yet been met.

Steps towards the eventual move from the building were finally taken in mid-2019, when the Passports, Immigration and Nationality Administration, which occupied 215 offices in the first and second floors, and used to attract more than %75 of citizens going to the Mogamma, was moved to its new grounds at Al Abbassia. In addition, 140 offices affiliated with the Ministry of Social Solidarity which used to occupy the fifth floor of the building have been evacuated.

== During the Egyptian revolution of 2011 ==
During the 2011 Egyptian revolution, the Mogamma was closed on account of the sit-in in Tahrir Square. A second sit-in in Tahrir Square, beginning on 8 July 2011, also included a blockade of the Mogamma.

== See also ==
- Qasr El Eyni Street
- Tahrir Square
- Downtown Cairo
