= Mohamed Kamal Ismail =

Egyptian architect

- Born: September 13, 1908
- Died: August 2, 2008 (aged 99)
- Occupation: Architect
- Projects: Great Mosque of Mecca; Al-Masjid an-Nabawi

Mohamed Kamal Ismail (محمد كمال اسماعيل) (born; 13 September 1908 – 2 August 2008) was an Egyptian architect.

== Career ==
His most prominent work is the expansion of the Great Mosque of Mecca and Al-Masjid an-Nabawi, as well as The Mogamma and High Court of Egypt.
