= Tahrir Square =

Town square in Downtown Cairo, Egypt

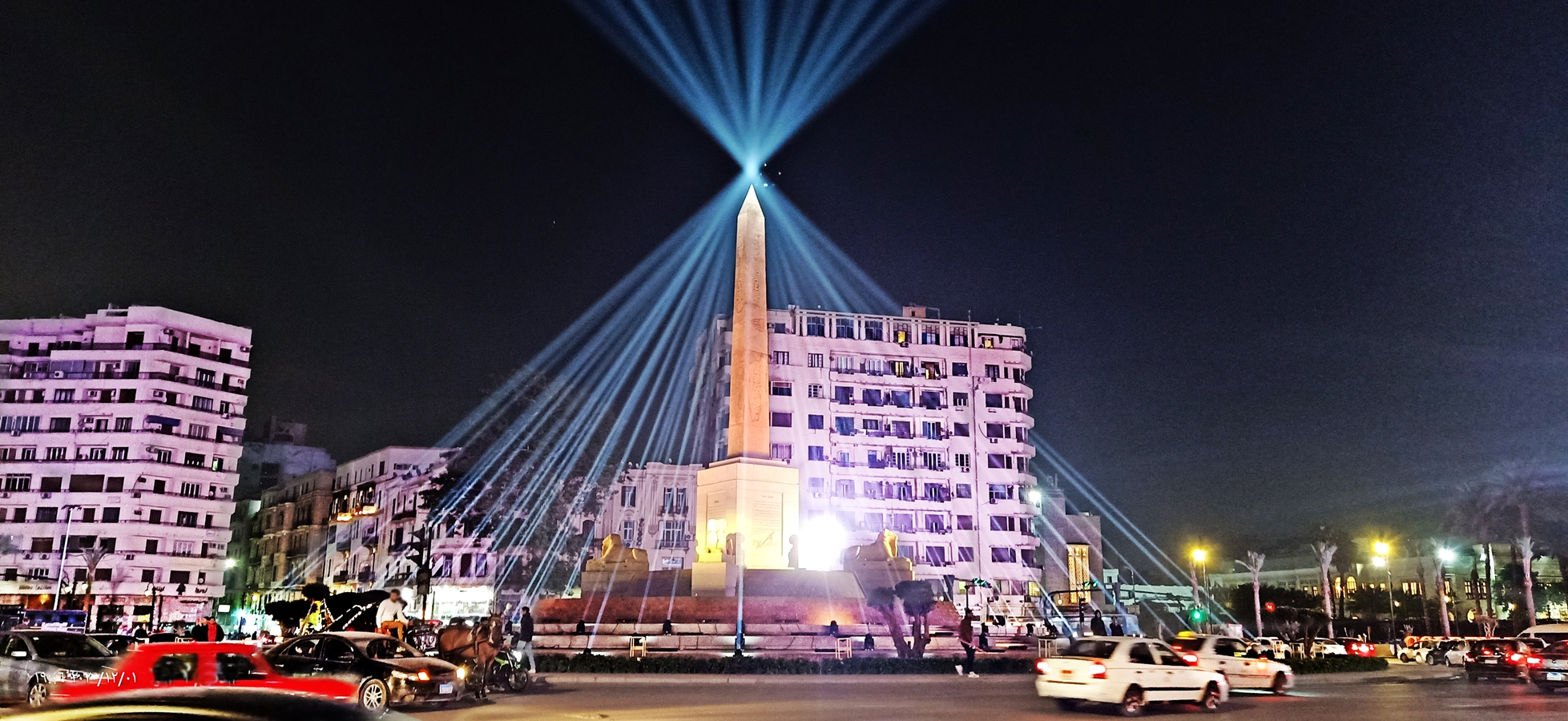
- Tahrir Square in December 2020

- Location within Nile Delta
- Former name: Ismailia Square
- Location: Downtown Cairo, Cairo, Egypt
- Coordinates: 30°02′40″N 31°14′9″E

Other
- Designer: Khedive Ismail

Tahrir Square (Arabic: ميدان التحرير, romanized: Maydān at-Taḥrīr, Egyptian Arabic pronunciation: [meˈdæːn ettæħˈɾiːɾ]; English: "Liberation Square"), also known as Martyr Square, is a public town square in downtown Cairo, Egypt. The square has been the location and focus for political demonstrations. The 2011 Egyptian revolution and the resignation of President Hosni Mubarak occurred at the Tahrir Square.

== History ==
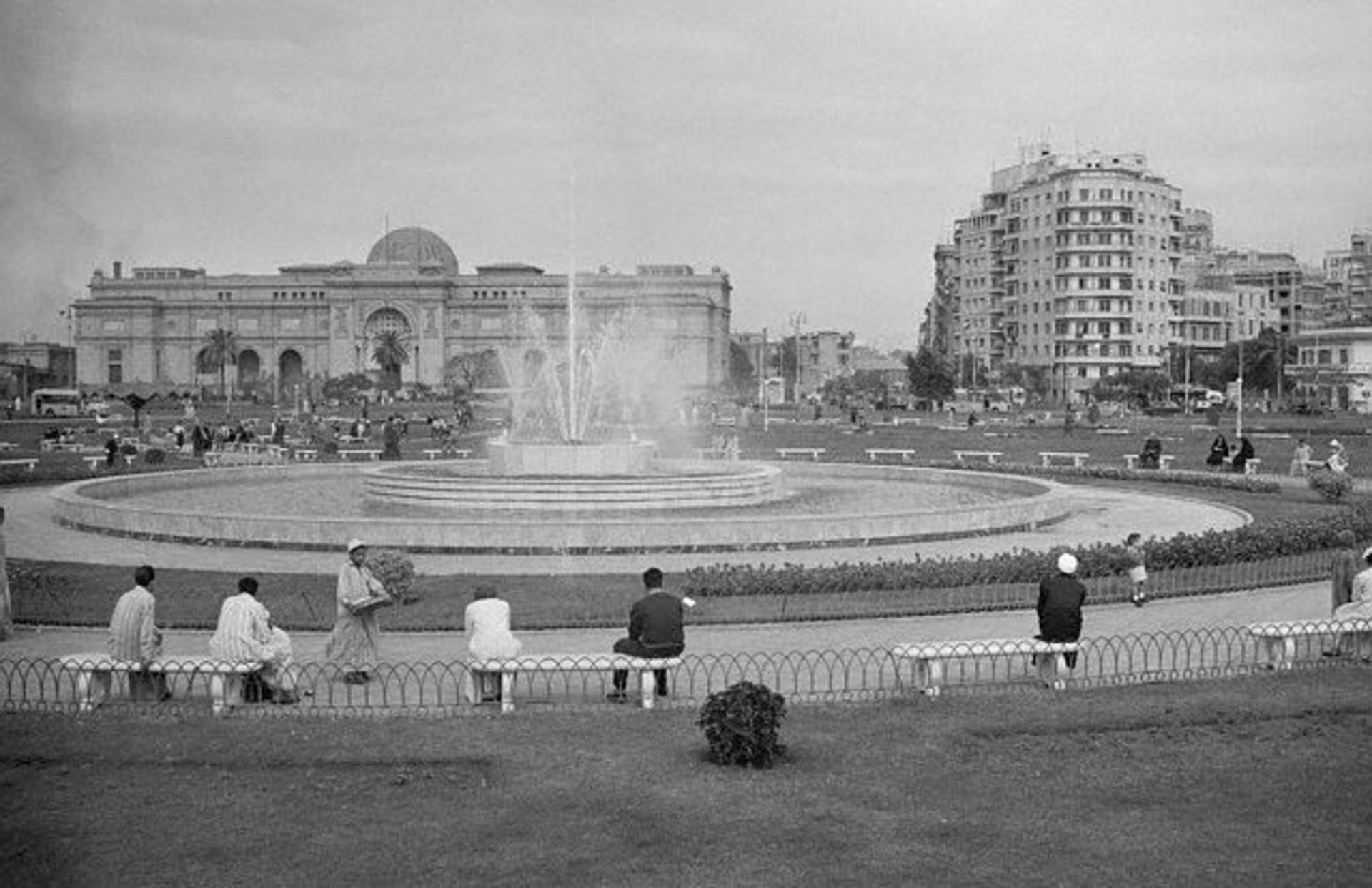
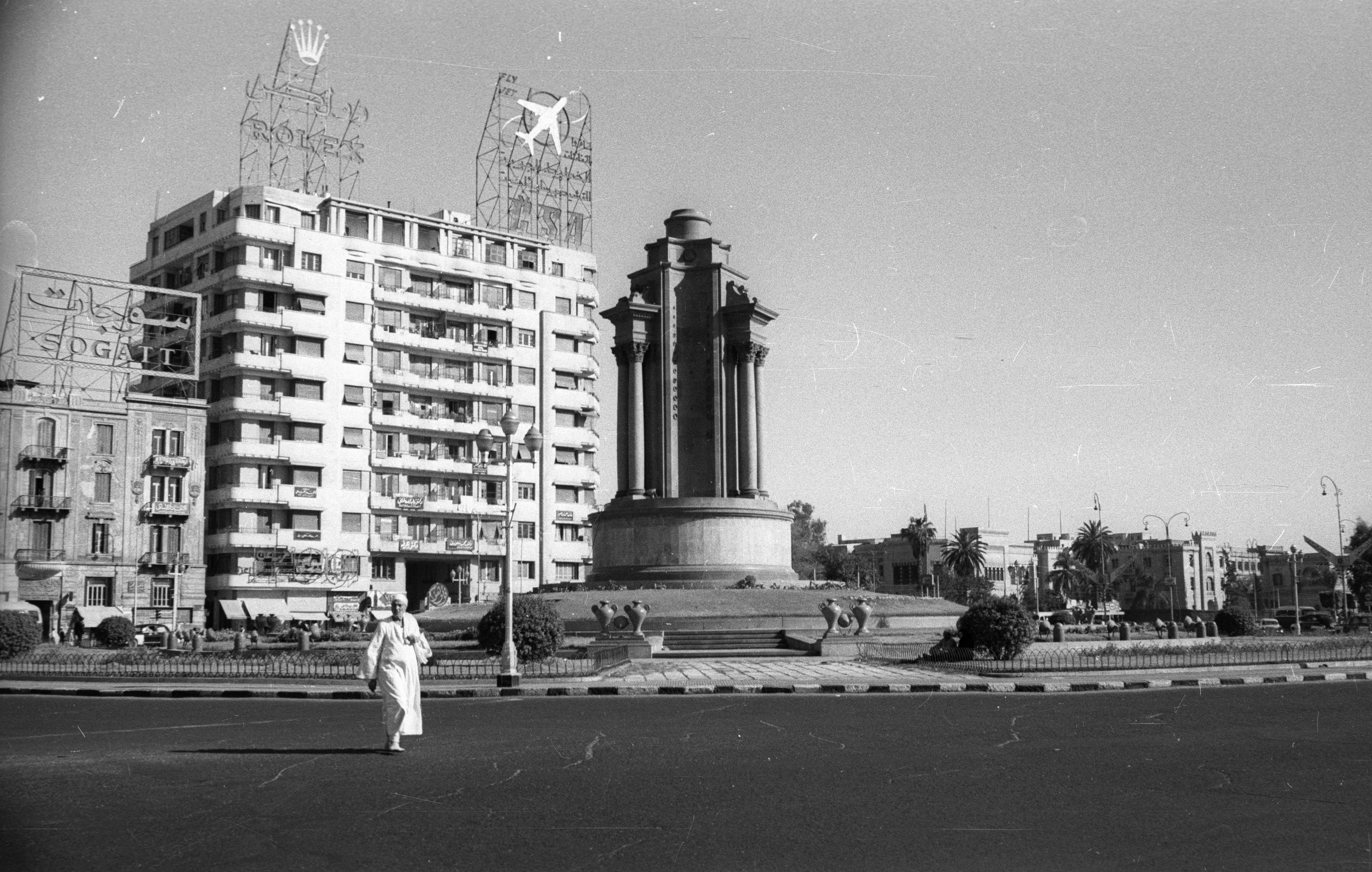
Tahrir Square in c. 1941 and 1962 (with the pedestal installed by King Farouk before 1952)

The square was originally called "Ismailia Square", after the 19th-century ruler of Egypt, Khedive Ismail, who commissioned the new downtown district's 'Paris on the Nile'.

After the Egyptian Revolution of 1919, the square became widely known as Tahrir (Liberation) Square. In 1933 King Fuad I (r. 1922–1936), the son of Khedive Ismail, renamed the square officially to Khedive Ismail Square (Maydān al-Khidaywī Ismā‘īl). Before the end of his reign in 1936, a roundabout with a garden was created at the center of the square. Under his successor, King Farouk (r. 1936–1952), a pedestal was installed in the center of square which was intended to support a statue of Khedive Isma'il, but the commissioned statue was never installed. The square was officially renamed to "Tahrir Square" in 1953, after the Egyptian Revolution of 1952 which changed Egypt from a constitutional monarchy into a republic.

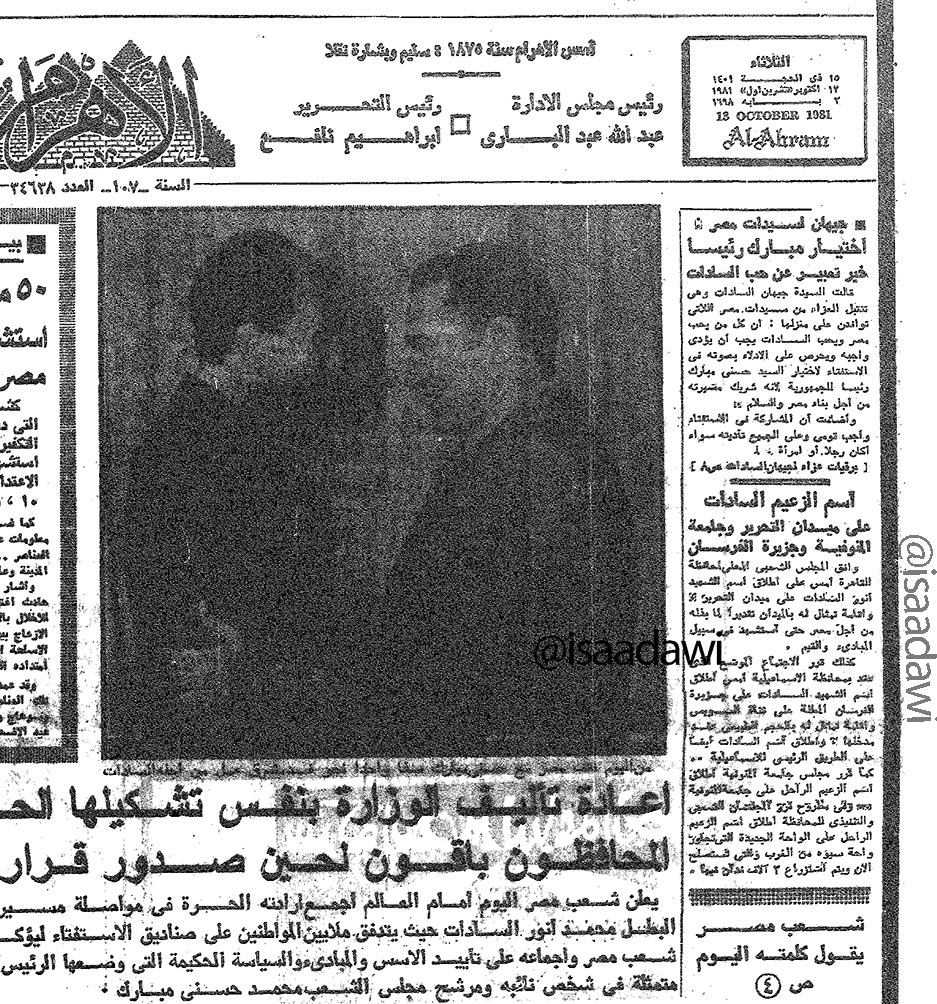
The official article attesting to the state directives to rename Tahrir Square to Anwar El Sadat Square

On 13 October 1981, one week after the assassination of President Muhammad Anwar el-Sadat, the square was renamed as "Anwar El Sadat Square" (Maydān Anwar al-Sādāt) and a statue was planned to be erected. This new official name, however, never entered popular usage and was not familiar to most Egyptians. The statue-less pedestal erected by King Farouk was eventually removed in 1987 during the construction of the Sadat metro station under the square.

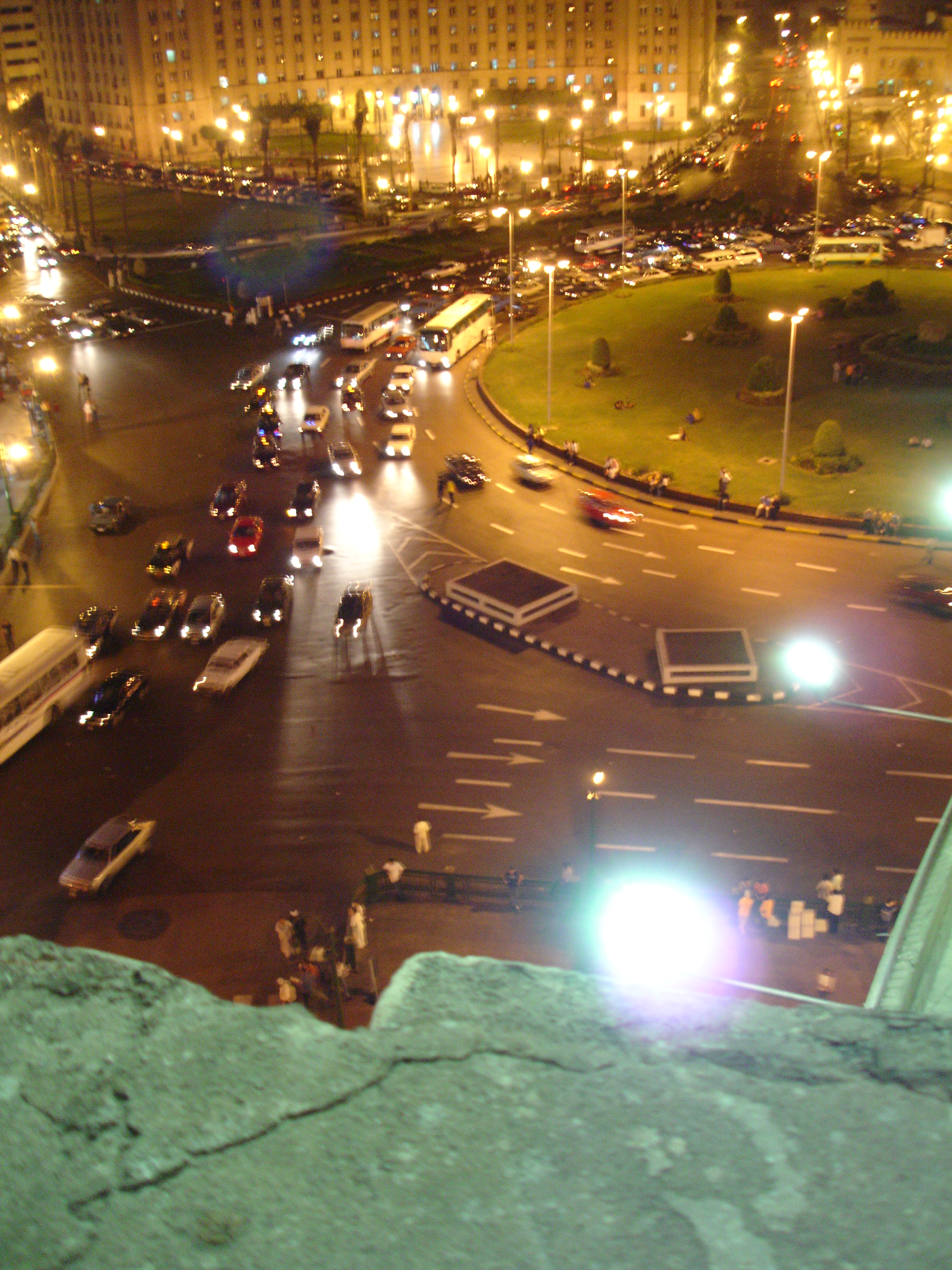
Tahrir Square at night with traffic circle, view northwest from Talaat Harb Street, during the 2000s

The square was a focal point for the Egyptian Revolution of 2011 and subsequent protests, up to the 2013 Egyptian protests which led to the overthrow of President Morsi. In November 2013, after these events, the interim government erected a memorial to activists and protesters who were killed by security forces during the 2011 and 2013 protests. On 19 November, less than a day after its official inauguration, the new monument was destroyed by protesters and activists, who criticized the government's intentions and accused it of attempting to whitewash recent history by creating its own memorial to those who died in the protests. In 2015, the government of President el-Sisi erected a large flagpole flying the Egyptian flag in the center of the square, which authorities judged would be a more neutral monument that would attract less controversy.

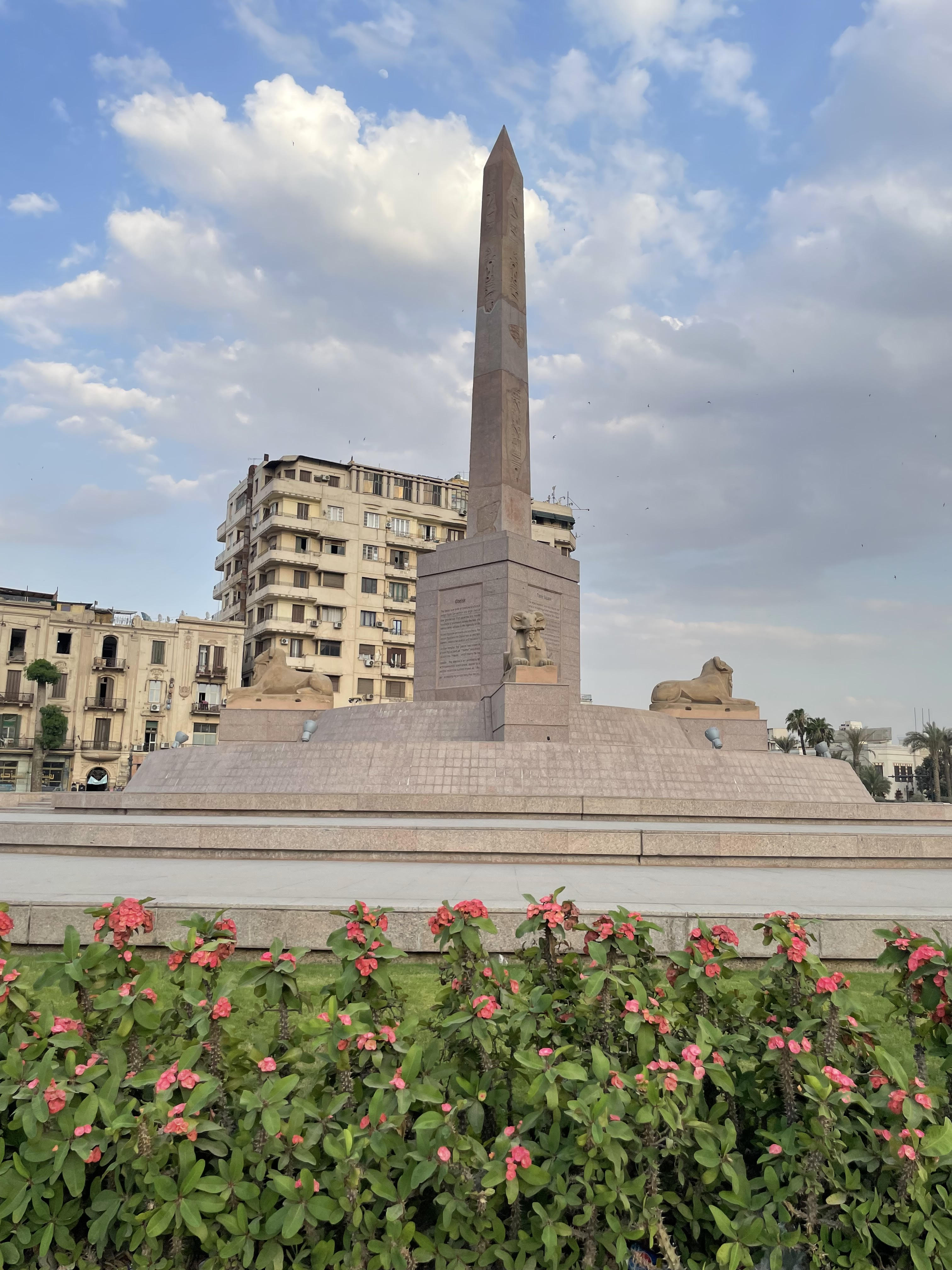
Tahrir Square in 2023

In 2020 the government erected a new monument at the center of Tahrir Square featuring an ancient obelisk from the reign of Ramses II, originally unearthed at Tanis (San al-Hagar) in 2019, and four ram-headed sphinx statues moved from Karnak. The installation of the sphinxes in particular has been criticized by archeologists and academics, who state that the soft sandstone of the sculptures will be vulnerable to the pollution and heat of downtown traffic. Some critics have also alleged that the creation of the new monument is part of an ongoing effort to tighten state control over this public space and obscure the memory of the 2011 revolution whose central events took place here.

== Features ==
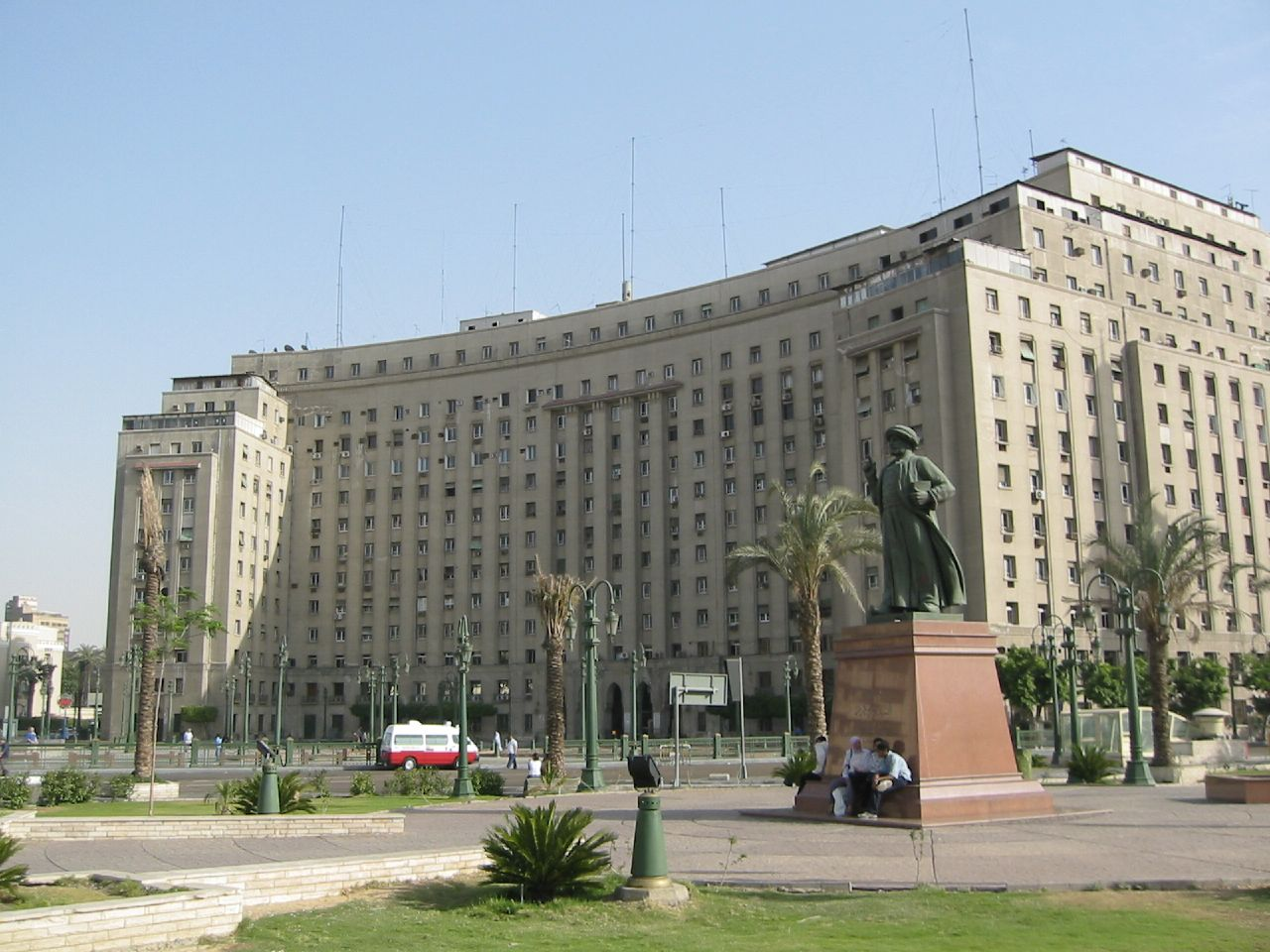
View south towards the Mogamma building and Umar Makram statue

At the centre of Tahrir Square is a large and busy traffic circle. An obelisk of Ramses II, previously at Tanis, was installed in 2020. On the north-east side is a plaza with a statue of nationalist hero Umar Makram, celebrated for his resistance against Napoleon I's invasion of Egypt, and beyond is the Umar Makram Mosque.

The square is the northern terminus of the historic Qasr al-Ayni Street, the western terminus of Talaat Harb Street, and via Qasr al-Nil Street crossing its southern portion it has direct access to the Qasr al-Nil Bridge crossing the nearby Nile River.

The area around Tahrir Square includes the Egyptian Museum, the Folklore Arts House, the Mogamma government building, the Headquarters of the Arab League building, the Nile Hotel, Kasr El Dobara Evangelical Church and the original downtown campus of the American University in Cairo. The National Democratic Party-NDP headquarters building stood here until it was set on fire during the revolution and demolished in 2015.

The Cairo Metro serves Tahrir Square with the Sadat Station, which is the downtown junction of the system's two lines, linking to Giza, Maadi, Helwan, and other districts and suburbs of Greater Cairo. Its underground access viaducts provide the safest routes for pedestrians crossing the broad roads of the heavily trafficked square.

== Public use and demonstrations ==
Tahrir Square has been the traditional site for numerous major protests and demonstrations over the years, including the 1977 Egyptian Bread Riots, and the March 2003 protest against the War in Iraq.

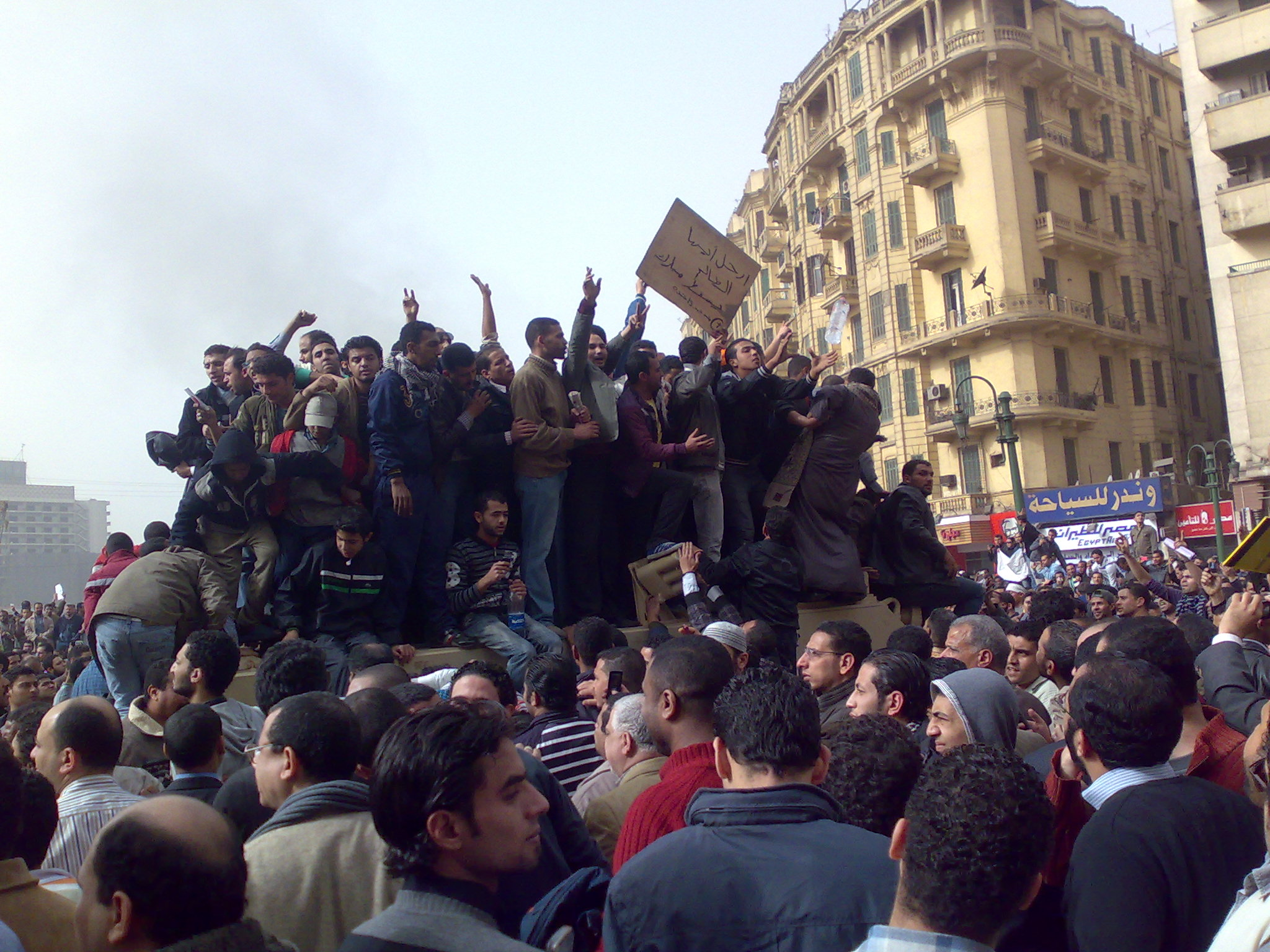
Protesters on an army vehicle during the 2011 Egyptian Revolution in Tahrir Square

=== 2011 revolution ===
Tahrir Square was the focal point of the 2011 Egyptian revolution against former president Hosni Mubarak. Over 50,000 protesters first occupied the square on 25 January, during which the area's wireless services were reported to be impaired. In the following days, Tahrir Square continued to be the primary destination for protests in Cairo. On 29 January, Egyptian fighter aircraft flew low over the people gathered in the square. On 30 January, the seventh day of the protests, PIK BBC and other correspondents reported that the number of demonstrators had grown to at least 100,000, and on 31 January, Al Jazeera correspondents reported that the demonstrations had grown to at least 250,000 people.

On 1 February, Al Jazeera reported that more than one million protesters peacefully gathered in the square and adjacent streets. However, such media reports that so many people congregated in Cairo's largest public square are believed to be exaggerated for political purposes and, according to Stratfor's analysis, the real number of gathered protesters never exceeded 300,000 people. Other independent crowd-size analyses provided similar estimates, suggesting a maximum capacity of 200,000 to 250,000 individuals within the square and surrounding areas.

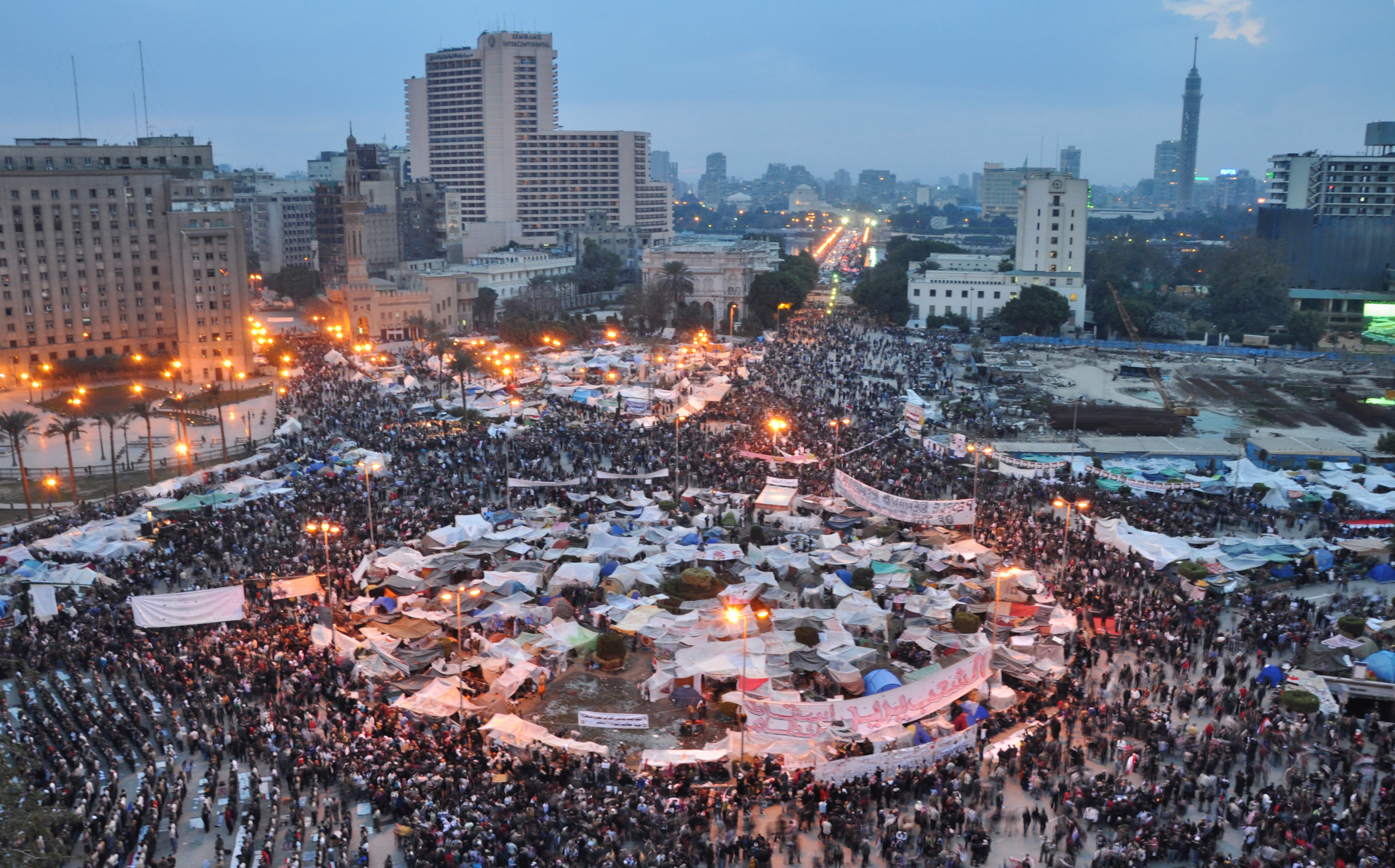
People congregated in Tahrir Square on 9 February 2011

The square became established as a focal point and a symbol for the ongoing Egyptian democracy demonstrations. On 2 February, violence erupted between the pro-Mubarak and pro-democracy demonstrators there, followed by the 3 February 'Friday of Departure' demonstration, one of the named "day of" events centered in the square. Within a week, due to international media coverage, the image and name of Tahrir Square became known worldwide.

A Facebook page called "Tahrir Square" ميدان التحرير was maintained by a rotating staff of twenty during the uprising, particularly to offset the lack of and/or distorted coverage of events and responses in state-run and state-aligned media outlets.

The 18-day revolt centered in the square provided the Egyptian Armed Forces an opportunity to remove Mubarak from power on 11 February 2011, when the president officially stepped down from office. The announcement that Mubarak had passed all authority to the Council of the Armed Forces was made by longtime intelligence chief and new vice president Omar Suleiman. Tahrir Square erupted in a night-long celebration after the twilight announcement, with shouts such as "Lift your head up high, you're Egyptian", "Everyone who loves Egypt, come and rebuild Egypt", and others. The next day, Cairo locals came to clean up the square and surrounding streets, removing eighteen days' worth of trash and graffiti.

=== Post-revolution ===
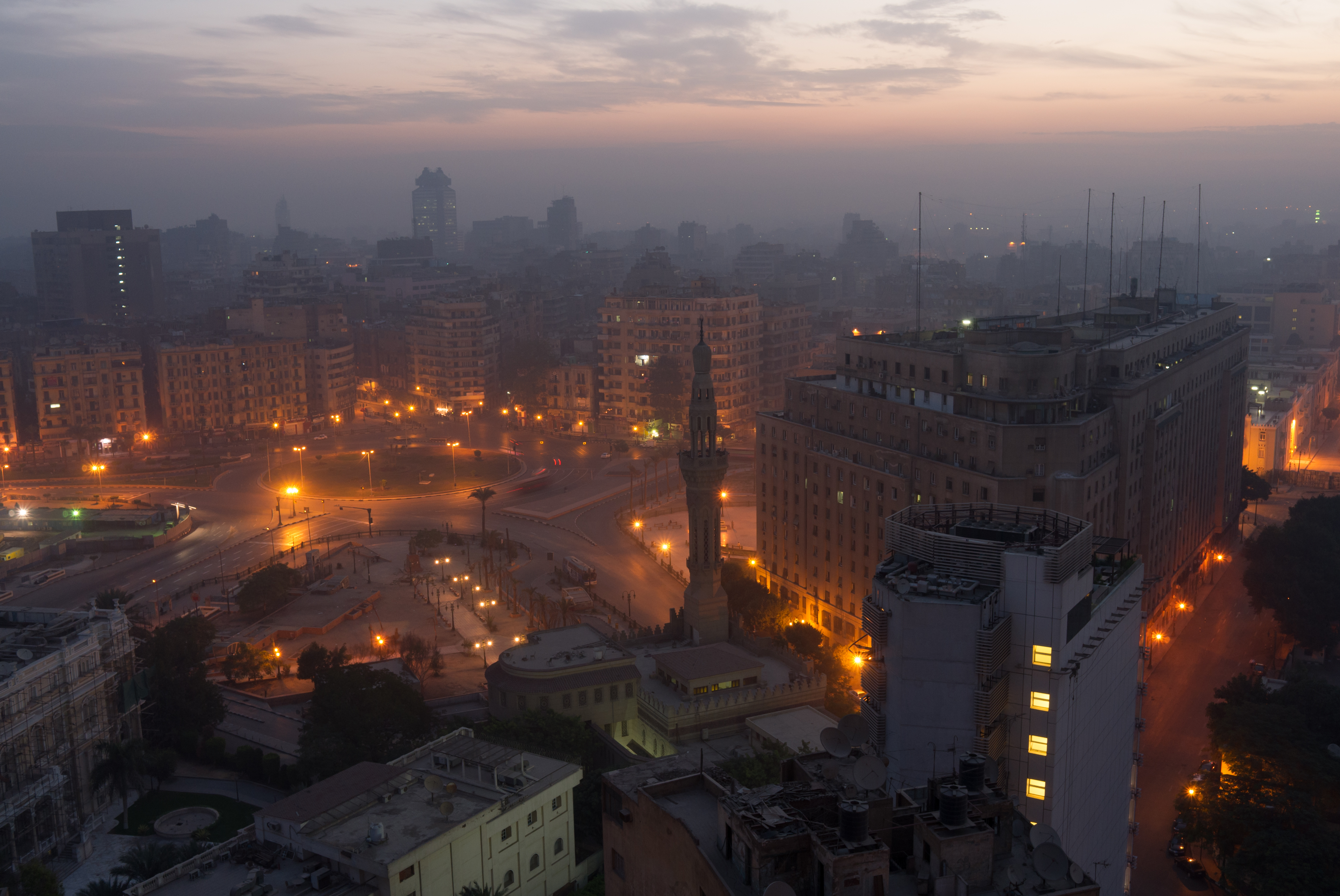
Tahrir Square in the early morning, November 2012

Tahrir Square, with 'democracy anniversary' celebrations and visits from foreign dignitaries, continued to be a symbol of the 2011 Egyptian Revolution, despite its clear gentrification and depoliticization by the Egyptian government. British Prime Minister David Cameron, Catherine Ashton, the High Representative for Foreign Affairs and Security Policy of the European Union, U.S. Secretary of State Hillary Clinton, John Kerry, Chairman of the American Senate Committee on Foreign Relations, Australian Foreign Minister Kevin Rudd, and American actor Sean Penn visited Tahrir Square after the 2011 Revolution.

One of the ships in the planned Freedom Flotilla II, intended to break the Israeli blockade of Gaza, was named Tahrir after the square. Among its passengers was Haaretz reporter Amira Hass. Ultimately, the sailing did not take place.

==== June 2013 protests and Morsi overthrow ====
On 29 June 2013, thousands of Egyptians converged on Tahrir Square to demonstrate against the Egyptian President Mohamed Morsi, demanding his resignation from office. The demonstrators used the slogan "the people want the ouster of the regime," used in the protests that led to the 2011 revolution.

By the 30th, their number had increased and demonstrations were reported to be in progress in 18 locations across Cairo. The demonstration had hundreds of thousands of protesters, although the Egyptian Government claims there were 33 million in the street, this number is highly suspected of since the largest square in Egypt, Tahrir Square, can only hold 200,000-225,000 people maximum, according to earlier crowd-size analyses.

On 3 July 2013, General Abdul Fatah al-Sisi announced the removal of President Mohamed Morsi and suspended the Egyptian constitution after ongoing public protests. The move was described as a "coup d'état" by supporters of Morsi and/or the Muslim Brotherhood and much of the international media, but when combined with the protests, it has instead been described by its supporters, as well as other media outlets, as a revolution.

==== Pharaoh's Golden Parade ====
On 3 April 2021, the square witnessed a huge parade in which twenty-two mummies were moved from the Egyptian Museum to the National Museum of Egyptian Civilization.

== See also ==
- Downtown Cairo
- The Square, a documentary film about the square and its role in Egyptian politics
- Contemporary art in Egypt
