= Downtown Cairo =

Commercial district of Cairo, Egypt

Coordinates: 30°02′51″N 31°14′18″E

Downtown Cairo وسط البلد
- Khedival Cairo
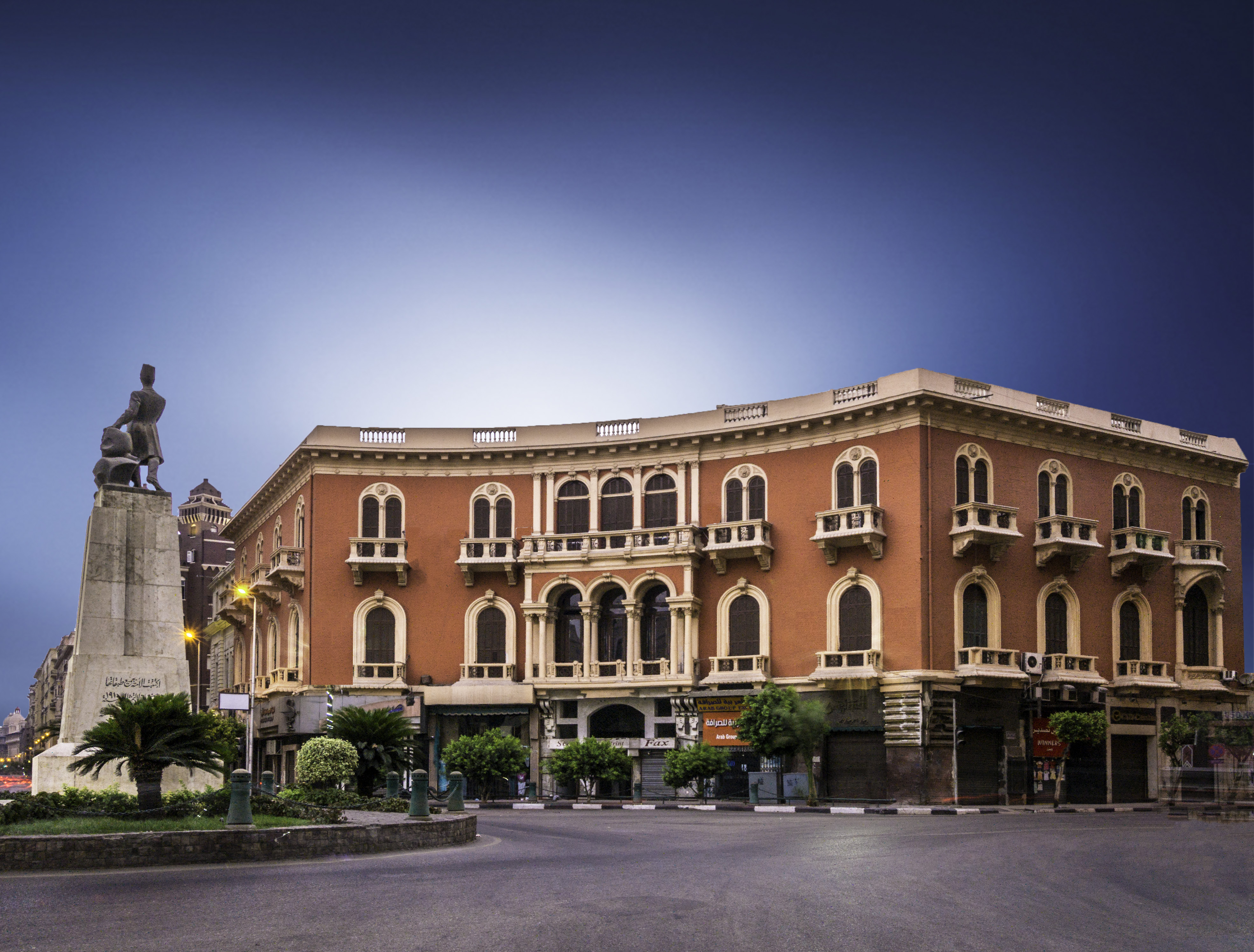
- Mustafa Kamel Square in Downtown Cairo
- Nickname: Paris on the Nile
- Interactive map of Downtown Cairo
- Country: Egypt
- Governorate: Cairo
- City: Cairo

Downtown Cairo (Egyptian Arabic: وسط البلد Wust al-Balad, 'middle of town') is the colloquial name given to the 19th-century western expansion of Egypt's capital Cairo, between the historic medieval Cairo and the Nile, which became the commercial center of the city during the 20th century. Given its rich architectural heritage from the era of Khedive Ismail, it has been officially named Khedival Cairo and declared by the government as a protected Area of Value, with many of its buildings also deemed protected.

Administratively Wust al-Balad covers areas of the Qasr al-Nil district, and the Abdeen and Azbakeya districts. The protected Khedival Cairo covers a larger area extending south to Sayeda Zeinab.

== History ==
Downtown Cairo was designed by French architects who were commissioned by Khedive Ismail during a visit to Paris, because he wanted to make the Egyptian capital better than Paris and become the jewel of the Orient. It was he who stressed the importance of European-style urban planning in Cairo, to include broad, linear gridded streets, geometric harmony and modern European architectural style.

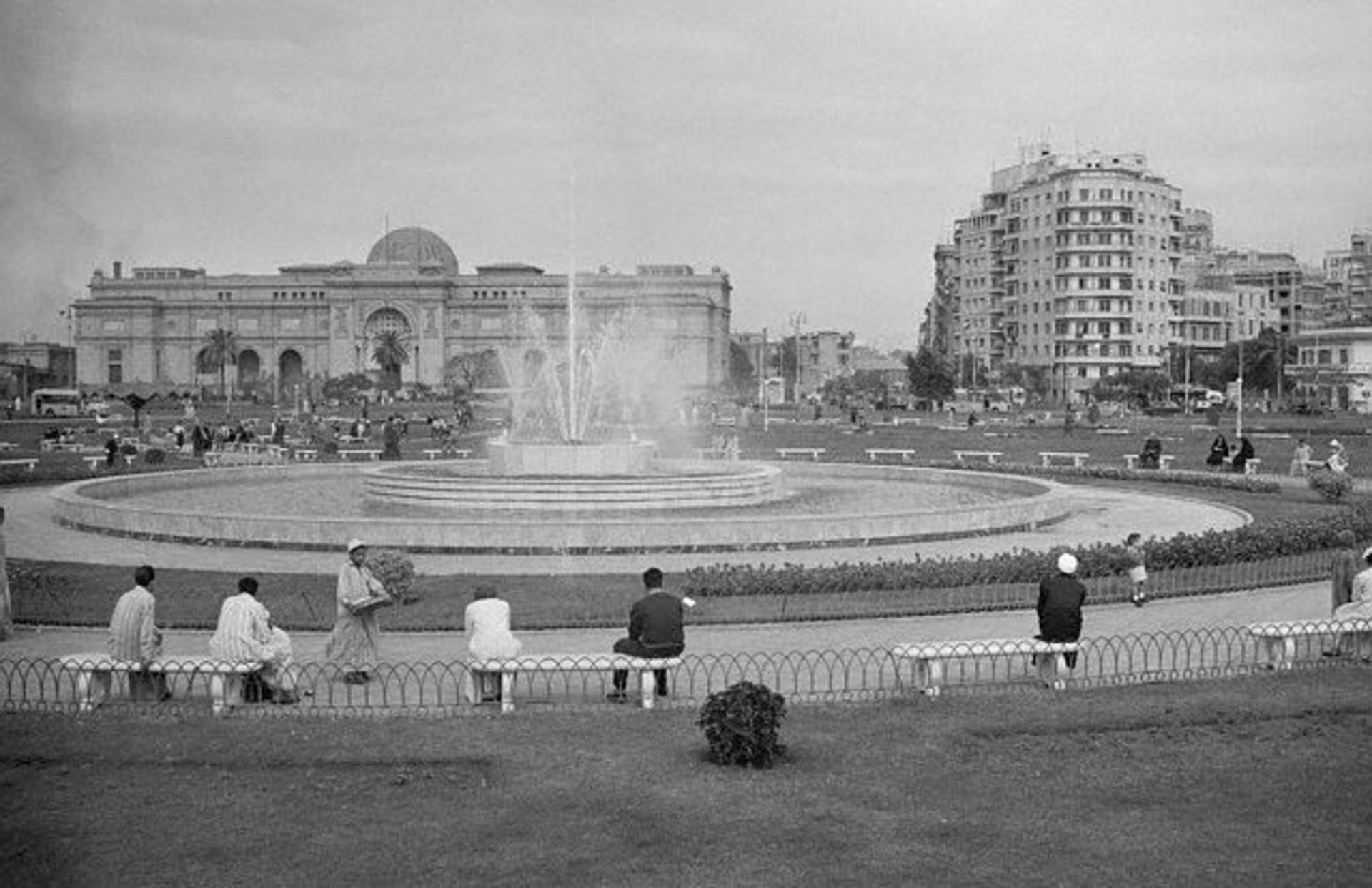
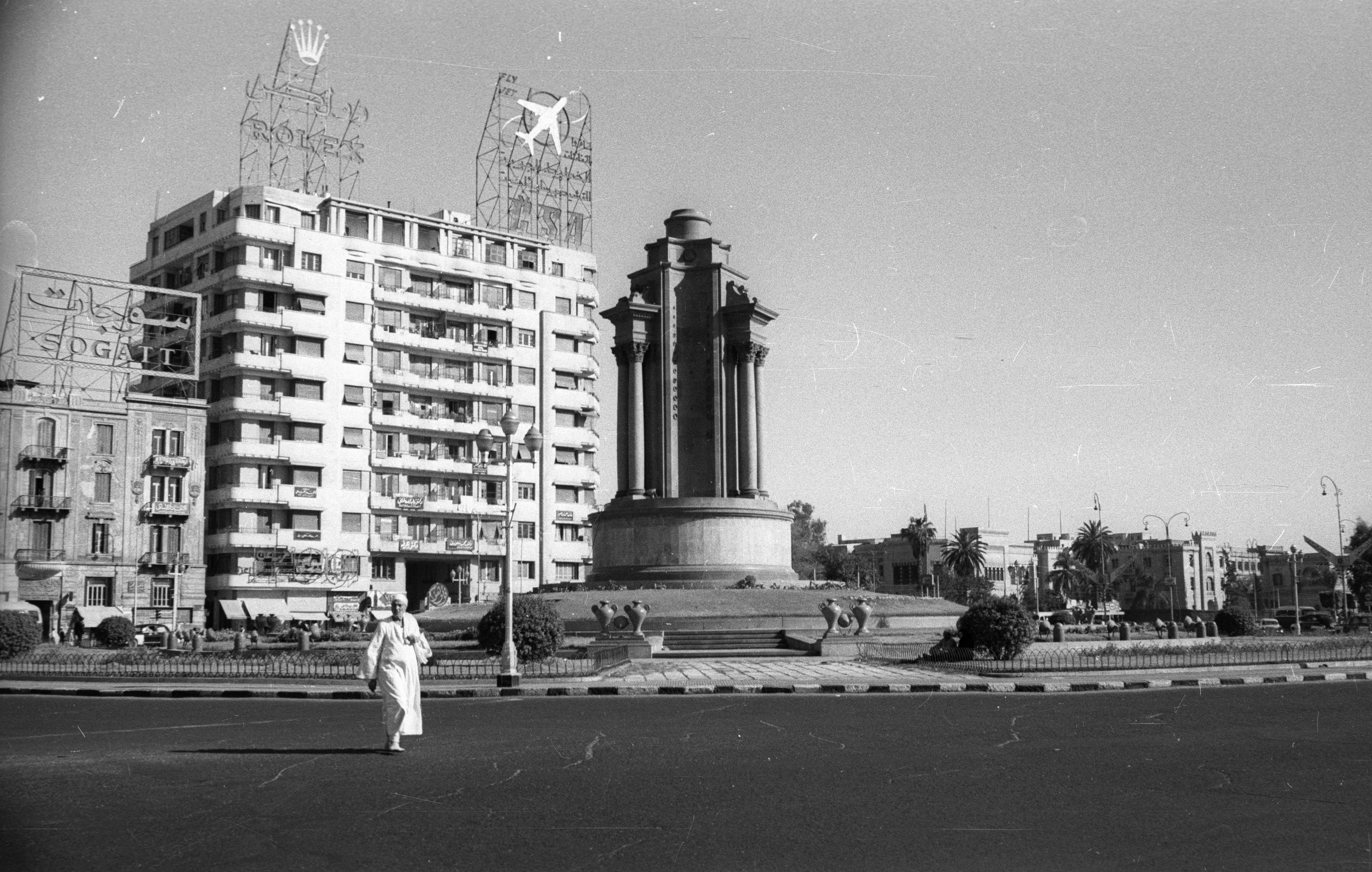
Tahrir Square in c. 1941 and 1962 (with the pedestal installed by King Farouk before 1952)

The area was once home to the elite of late 19th- and early 20th-century Cairo. It was a time of a bygone era – Egypt's belle epoque — and demonstrates a vision for developing Egypt. However, decades of neglect have decayed the area, due to landlords and tenants following the burning of much Cairo during the Cairo fire, prior to the 1952 Revolution led by Gamal Abdel Nasser. The ensuing departure of the upper classes contributed to this decline. Historic buildings within the area have been renovated by the Ministry of Housing, Utilities, and Urban Development.

== Landmarks ==
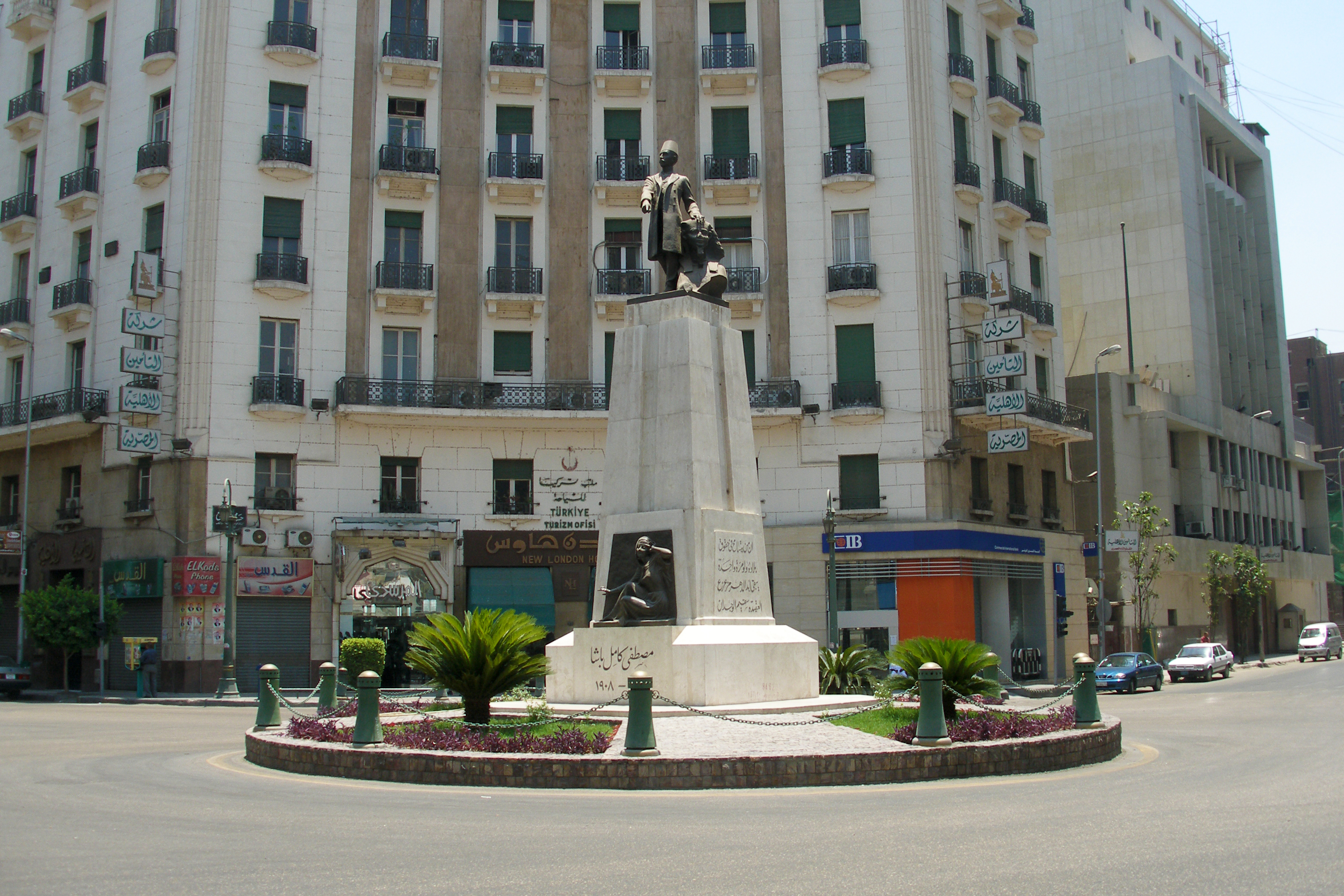
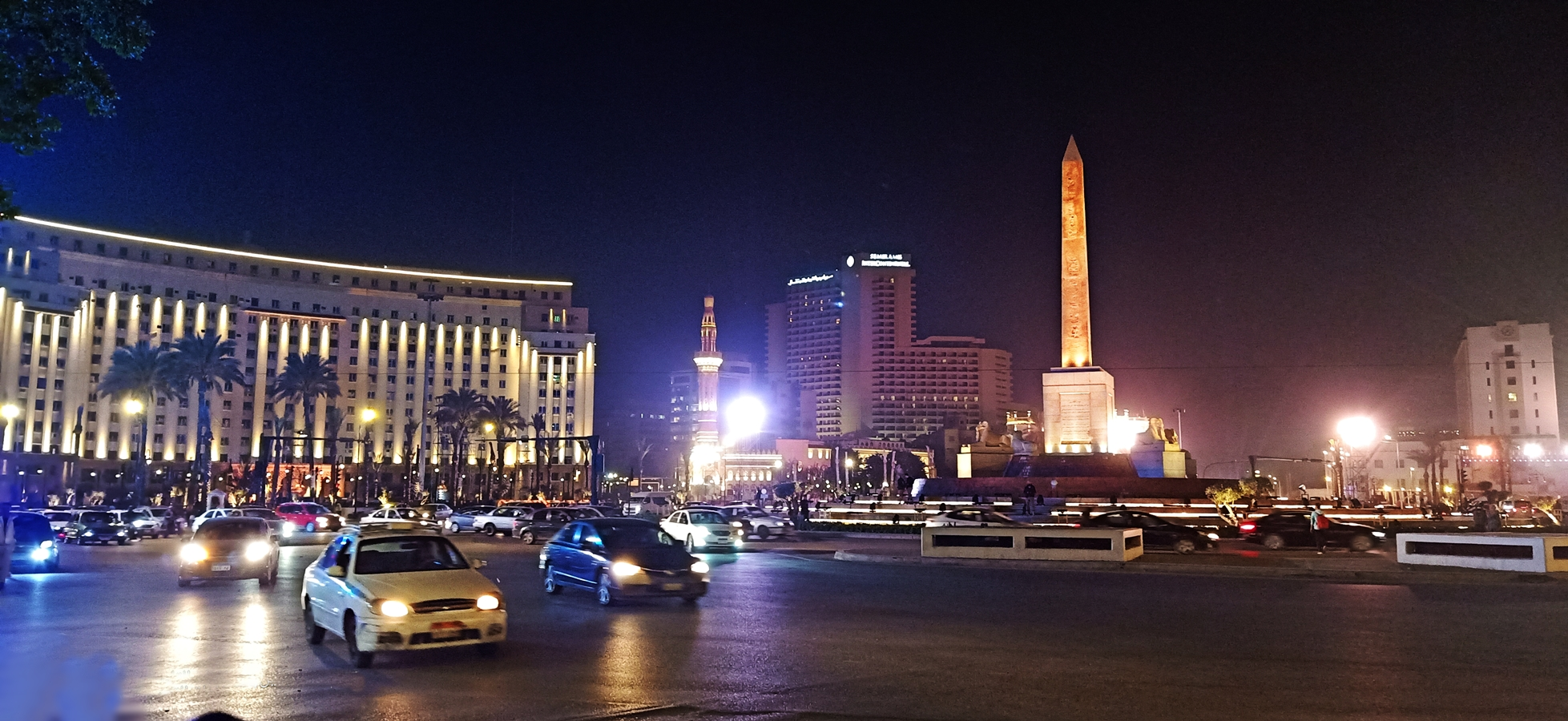
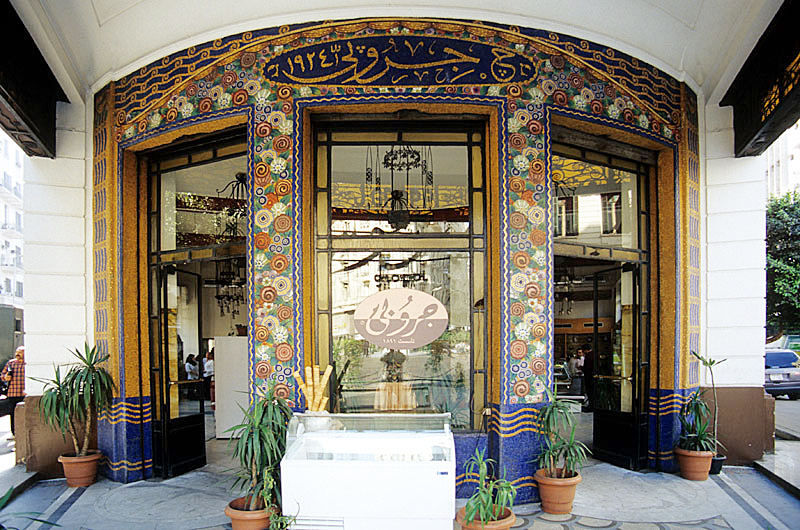
Mustafa Kamel Square, Tahrir Square and Groppi, an ice cream shop in Talaat Harb Square

=== Tahrir Square ===
A major public town square made internationally famous during the 2011 Egyptian revolution.

=== Qasr El Nil Street ===
One of Wust al-Balad's main streets is lined with vintage architecture from the late 19th and early 20th-century European Beaux-Arts and Egyptian-Islamic-Moorish Revival styles.

=== Talaat Harb Street ===
Another important Wust al-Balad street, with famous cafes and restaurants.

=== Qasr El Eyni Street ===
Qasr El Eyni Street is considered one of the oldest streets in Downtown Cairo. It is a one-way street that leads to Tahrir Square and passes by several government buildings. It was opened in the 19th century. It is intersected by Sheikh Rihan Street, which leads to the Ministry of Interior, and then by Mohamed Mahmoud Street at Tahrir Square. The Scientific Complex, the House of Wisdom (or the Doctors' Syndicate), and the Egyptian Geographical Society (established in 1875) are all located on Qasr El Eyni street. The street takes its name from Qasr El-Aini, the oldest medical school, which was established during in the 19th century.

=== Mustafa Kamel Square ===
Mustafa Kamel Square is a public town square in the heart of downtown Cairo. It was named after the prominent Egyptian nationalist leader Mustafa Kamil (1874-1908), whose statue stands in the centre of the square. It was first established in 1867, under the name of El-Suares Square, and renamed in 1940.

=== Groppi ===
Groppi is one of the first and most famous ice cream shops in Cairo, located in Talaat Harb Square. It was founded in 1909 by the Swiss Groppi family, survived the nationalisation movement in the 1950s and 1960s, and was owned by the Groppi family until 1981 when it was bought by Abdul-Aziz Lokma.

=== Café Riche ===
One of the most renowned downtown landmarks, on the 29th of Talaat Harb Street, is the Café Riche, which opened in 1908. At various times a meeting place for intellectuals and revolutionaries, the café witnessed many historically significant events over the 20th century. It is said to be where King Farouk saw his second wife, Nariman Sadek; where the perpetrator of the 1919 failed assassination attempt on Egypt's last Christian Prime Minister, Youssef Wahba Pasha lay in wait for his target; and where several members of the resistance during the 1919 revolution met in the basement to organise their activities and print their flyers. Patrons included Egyptian Nobel Prize winner and nationalist novelist Naguib Mahfouz and the then-future president Gamal Abdel Nasser.

== Restoration ==
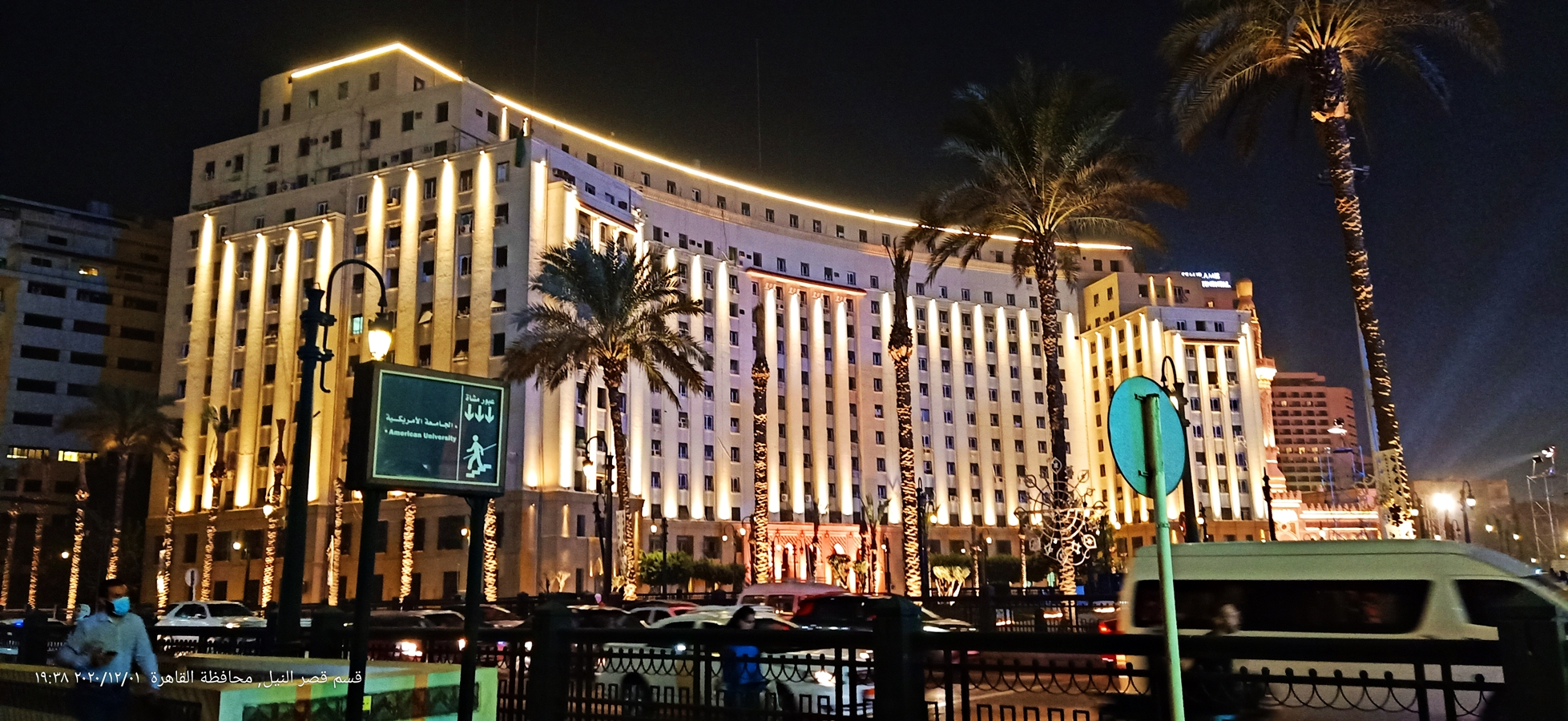
The Mogamma building in Tahrir Square, seen in 2020
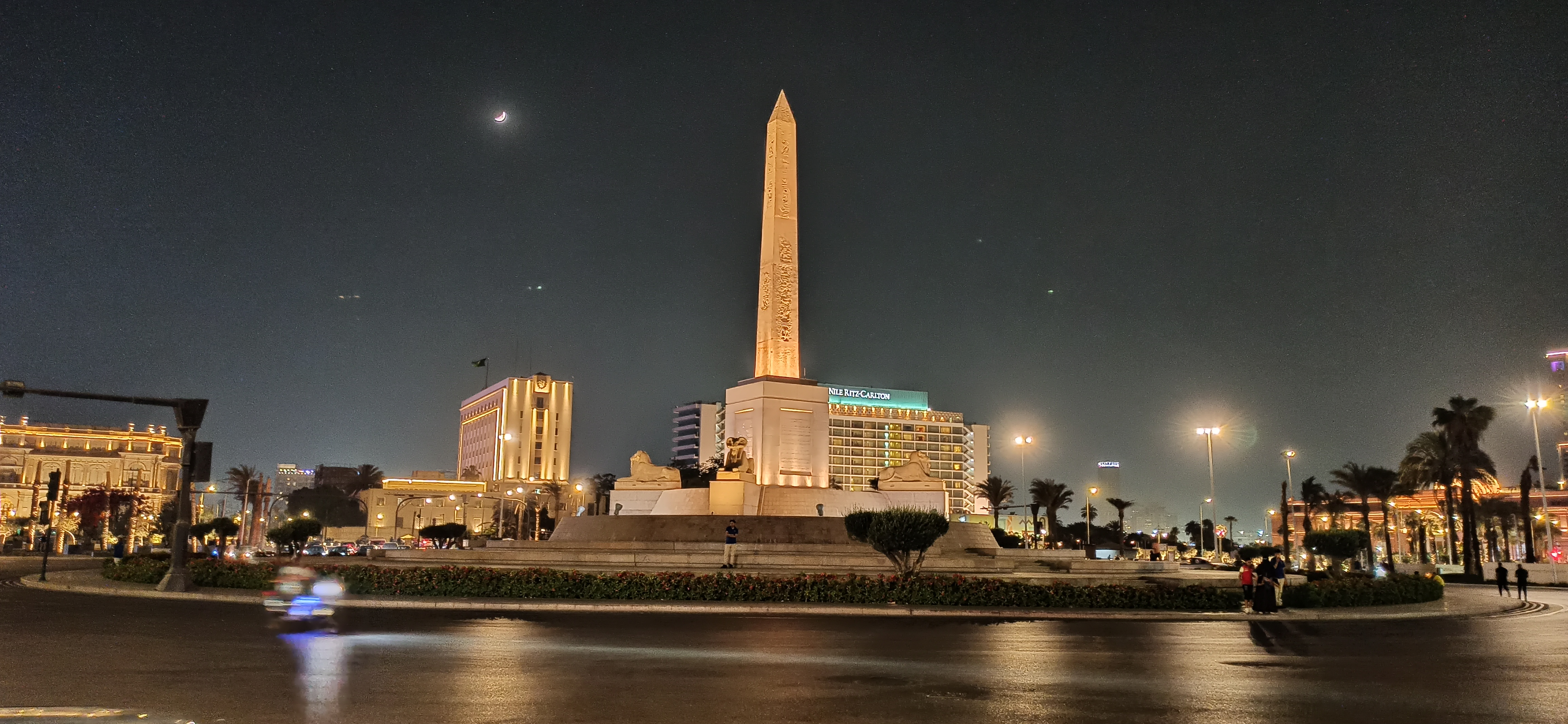
Tahrir Square circle, seen in 2020

There has been renewed interest from the government and the private sector since the 2000s to restore Down Town/Khedival Cairo. The government has done mostly cosmetic work, repainting facades and replacing store signage.

== See also ==
- Al-Khalifa District
