= Sabbagh =

Sabbagh (صباغ) is an Arabic surname that means 'dyer'. Notable people with the surname include:

- Abdulhakeem Alsabbagh, Omani Diplomat in Washington (2012–2016)
- Alan Sabbagh, an Argentinian actor
- Ali Sabbagh, a Lebanese football referee who has been a full international referee for FIFA since 2008
- Bassam al-Sabbagh, ambassador, permanent representative of Syria to the United Nations
- Dan Sabbagh, a British journalist who is the National News Editor of The Guardian
- Georges Hanna Sabbagh, an Egyptian and French artist
- Hasib Sabbagh, a Palestinian businessman, activist, and philanthropist
- Hammouda Sabbagh, Syrian politician
- Jackie Sabbagh, American poet
- Karl Sabbagh, a Palestinian-British writer, journalist and television producer
- Mahmoud Sabbagh, a Saudi filmmaker, producer, and writer
- Mustafa Sabbagh, Secretary-General of the National Coalition for Syrian Revolutionary and Opposition Forces
- Pierre Sabbagh, a major personality in French television, as a journalist, producer and director
- Salah al-Din al-Sabbagh, an Iraqi Army officer and Arab nationalist that led the Golden Square Nazis in the 1941 Iraqi coup d'état
- Samir Sabbagh, founder of the Nasserist Unionists Movement, a minor Lebanese political party
- Shaimaa al-Sabbagh, a 32-year-old woman whose death on camera perpetuated the post-coup unrest in Egypt (2013–2014)
- Ziyad Sabbagh (born 1960), Syrian politician

== See also ==
- Sabag
