= Shaimaa al-Sabbagh =

Egyptian human rights activist (1984–2015)

- شيماء الصباغ
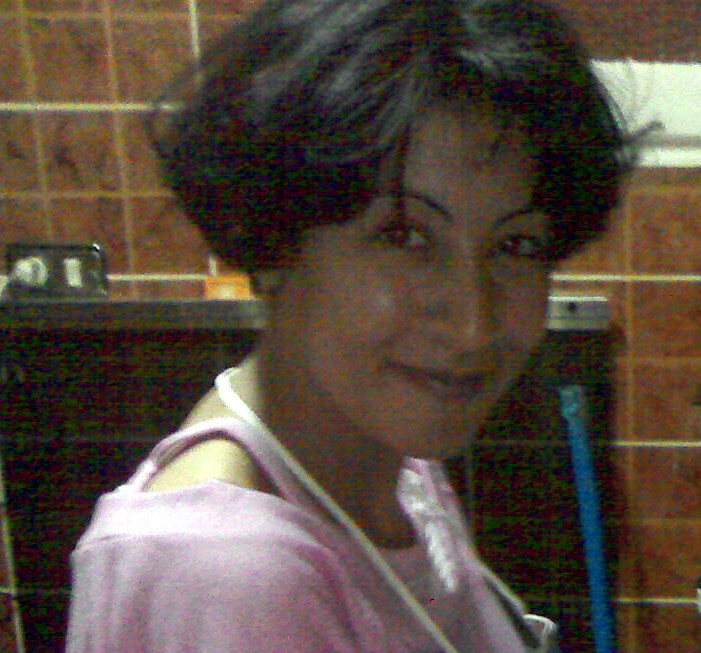
- Al-Sabbagh in 2006
- Born: 1984; Alexandria, Egypt
- Died: January 24, 2015; Cairo, Egypt
- Cause of death: Shot by police
- Occupations: Poet; Human rights activist
- Years active: 2011–2015
- Political party: Socialist Popular Alliance Party
- Spouse: Osama el-Sahli
- Children: 1

Shaimaa al-Sabbagh (Arabic: شيماء الصباغ; January 1984 – 24 January 2015) was an Egyptian poet and human rights activist. A prominent member of the Socialist Popular Alliance Party, she participated in demonstrations during and after the 2011 Egyptian revolution. Al-Sabbagh was killed during a demonstration to commemorate the fourth anniversary of the revolution in 2015, which led to her being given the title Martyr of the Rose (شهيدة الورد, Shahīdat al-Ward) among activists and reformers.

== Personal life ==
Al-Sabbagh was born and raised in the Gheit el-Saidi neighbourhood of Alexandria. She was married to Osama el-Sahli, a professor, with whom she had a son, Bilal. Al-Sabbagh had studied folklore, primarily the traditions of villages along the Nile. She wrote poetry, primarily in Egyptian Arabic, that commented on her daily life but also the social and political situation in Egypt, particularly following the 2011 revolution.

Al-Sabbagh was a member of the Socialist Popular Alliance Party, a leftist party that had been established shortly after the revolution. Through the party, she participated in many protests and demonstrations calling for reform in Egypt, becoming one of the party's most prominent members. In 2014, al-Sabbagh had co-founded the Workers' Bloc (الكتلة العمالية, al-Kutlah al-ʻUmmālīyah), which advocated for workers in Alexandria, particularly around political participation both as voters and candidates. She also advocated for the rights of street children and people living in slums in Alexandria.

== Death ==
On 24 January 2015, Sabbagh travelled to Cairo to meet with other members of the Socialist Popular Alliance Party at its headquarters. The group of around 40 activists planned to lead a march to Tahrir Square, the location of the outbreak of the 2011 revolution, to commemorate the fourth anniversary the end of the regime of the former President of Egypt, Hosni Mubarak, as well as to remember those killed during the revolution itself by laying wreaths. The actual anniversary of the revolution was the following day; however, the party decided not to do the march on the anniversary itself, due to worries about retaliation from the State anti demonstration forces, as the government who had announced that commemorations would be limited as a "mark of respect" for the death of King Abdullah of Saudi Arabia, who had died on 23 January.

The march started at party's headquarters; it quickly reached Talaat Harb Street, where entry to Tahrir Square was blocked off by the local police for Qasr El Nil. Tear gas and birdshots were quickly used to disperse the demonstration around ten minutes after it started. Al-Sabbagh, who was unnarmed, was hit in the back with a birdshot fired from around eight metres away. She collapsed into the arms of her friend and fellow activist Sayyed Abu el-Ela, who carried her to a sidewalk; her body was shortly afterwards placed on chairs outside of a nearby café. Activists attempted to get medical attention for al-Sabbagh, with an ambulance reportedly being prevented from being able to reach her by police, while her fellow marchers were arrested, leaving her body alone outside the café. A doctor at the café offered support but stated that she had died; an anonymous driver in the area, reported by some in the Egyptian media to be linked to the police, transported al-Sabbagh's body to the Cairo Kidney Centre, where it was left in a wheelchair. Al-Sabbagh was formally pronounced dead by doctors at the hospital.

== Aftermath ==
Al-Sabbagh's death was captured on camera by Egyptian photographer Islam Osama, who had been covering the march for the newspaper Youm El Sabea. Osama's sequence of six photos shows Sabbagh collapsing and being cradled by el-Ala. Osama fled the scene after the shooting due to concerns that his camera would be confiscated; the photos were published by Youm El Sabea and quickly went viral on social media and became republished in Egyptian media outlets.

A forensic examination of Al-Sabbagh concluded that she had died as a result of internal bleeding after birdshots hit her lungs and heart. Her funeral took place on 25 January in Alexandria; the following week, a memorial service was held for her at a mosque in Cairo. Seventeen people who attended the protest alongside al-Sabbagh were arrested and charged with taking part in an illegal demonstration; attacking security forces; blocking traffic; and chanting anti-government slogans. They were acquitted of all charges in May 2015, with the latter three charges being proven as false due to the significant video evidence of al-Sabbagh's death.

The Ministry of Interior initially denied that the police had been involved in al-Sabbagh's death, stating that forensic experts had determined that the police did not use the type of ammunition used to kill al-Sabbagh; it suggested that an "unknown party" was behind the killing, while one ministry spokesperson suggested that the video footage of her death had been staged. The ministerial response was significantly criticised in the media and following mounting public pressure the President of Egypt, Abdel Fattah el-Sisi, gave a speech in which he referred to al-Sabbagh as "my own daughter" and promised that those responsibile for her death would be held accountable. In the speech, el-Sisi stated that the incident should not "undermine public confidence in the police"; he subsequently replaced the Interior Minister, Mohamed Ibrahim Moustafa, in a cabinet reshuffle in March.

On 10 February, the public prosecutor of Qasr El Nil announced that a suspect was in police custody. In June 2015, Yassin Hatem Salaheddin, a police lieutenant, was sentenced to 15 years in prison for al-Sabbagh's premeditated manslaughter. Salaheddin had denied having ammunition in his weapon, while his lawyer stated that 2013 government legislation effectively banning street demonstrations had caused "confusion" amongst police officers during the march. Al-Sabbagh's family's lawyer described the sentence as "fair" and said "the soul of Shaimaa can now rest in peace".

In February 2016, Taha Qassim of the Egyptian Court of Cassation overturned Salaheddin's conviction on appeal, ordering a new trial. On 19 June 2017, Salaheddin was sentenced to ten years' imprisonment with hard labour. Salaheddin appealed the sentence for a second time, and on 10 June 2020, his sentence was reduced to seven years.

== Legacy ==
In 2015, Osama won the Shawkan Photo Award for Photojournalism for his sequence on al-Sabbagh's death.

Following her death, Time described al-Sabbagh as a "symbol against Egypt's military rule"; it likened the impact of footage of her death to that of Neda Agha-Soltan, an Iranian woman whose death during the 2009 Iranian protests was similarly widely seen online. The Egyptian poet Maged Zaher translated two of Sabbagh's poems, "A Letter in My Purse" and "I'm the Girl Banned from Christian Religious Classes". In 2017, Sabbagh's story was featured in the short story "Mahliya and Mauhub and the White-Footed Gazelle" by Sofia Samatar, featured in The Starlit Woods: New Fairy Tales.
