= Khedive Ismail (disambiguation) =

Khedive Ismail can refer to:

- Isma'il Pasha of Egypt
- SS Khedive Ismail, a ship sunk during World War II
- Qasr El Nil Bridge, formerly known as the Khedive Ismail Bridge, in Cairo
