= Jackie Sabbagh =

American poet

- Occupation: Poet
- Awards: 2025 Best New Poets selection

Academic background
- Education: University of Florida (MFA)
- Alma mater: University of Florida
- Website: jackiesabbagh.com

Jackie Sabbagh is an American writer. Her poetry and fiction has appeared in Poetry, AGNI, and Gulf Coast, and has been selected for the Best New Poets and Wigleaf Top 50 anthologies. She lives in New York.

== Biography ==
Sabbagh received her MFA in poetry from the University of Florida. In 2024, she appeared on WNYC as a featured guest for National Poetry Month, where she read and discussed her poem "A Child Clocks Me at the Bodega" (originally appearing in The Pinch).

Her poem "Having a Great Time Being Transgender in America Lately," originally published in the June 2024 issue of Poetry, subsequently went viral on Tumblr. Lauren James, writing on Arts Professional, highlighted the poem's cultural resonance during a period of intensifying attacks on transgender rights. Examining the poem's "capacity to dissociate," history scholar Jamie Heather Pelling argues that Sabbagh employs "a dissociative poetics to get through fascism with her self unscathed" and "hope without attachment." For Pelling, although the "fascist onslaught against trans life is 'obviously' working," the speaker remains dissociated, "eating shortbread on a patio table overlooking the enormous green ocean." It was selected for Best New Poets 2025 (University of Virginia Press, 2025) by guest editor Cecily Parks.

== Honors and awards ==
- 2024: The Poetry Foundation's Frederick Bock Prize
- 2025: Selection, Best New Poets 2025
