= Café Riche =

Building in Cairo, Egypt

Coordinates: 30.047002°N 31.238271°E

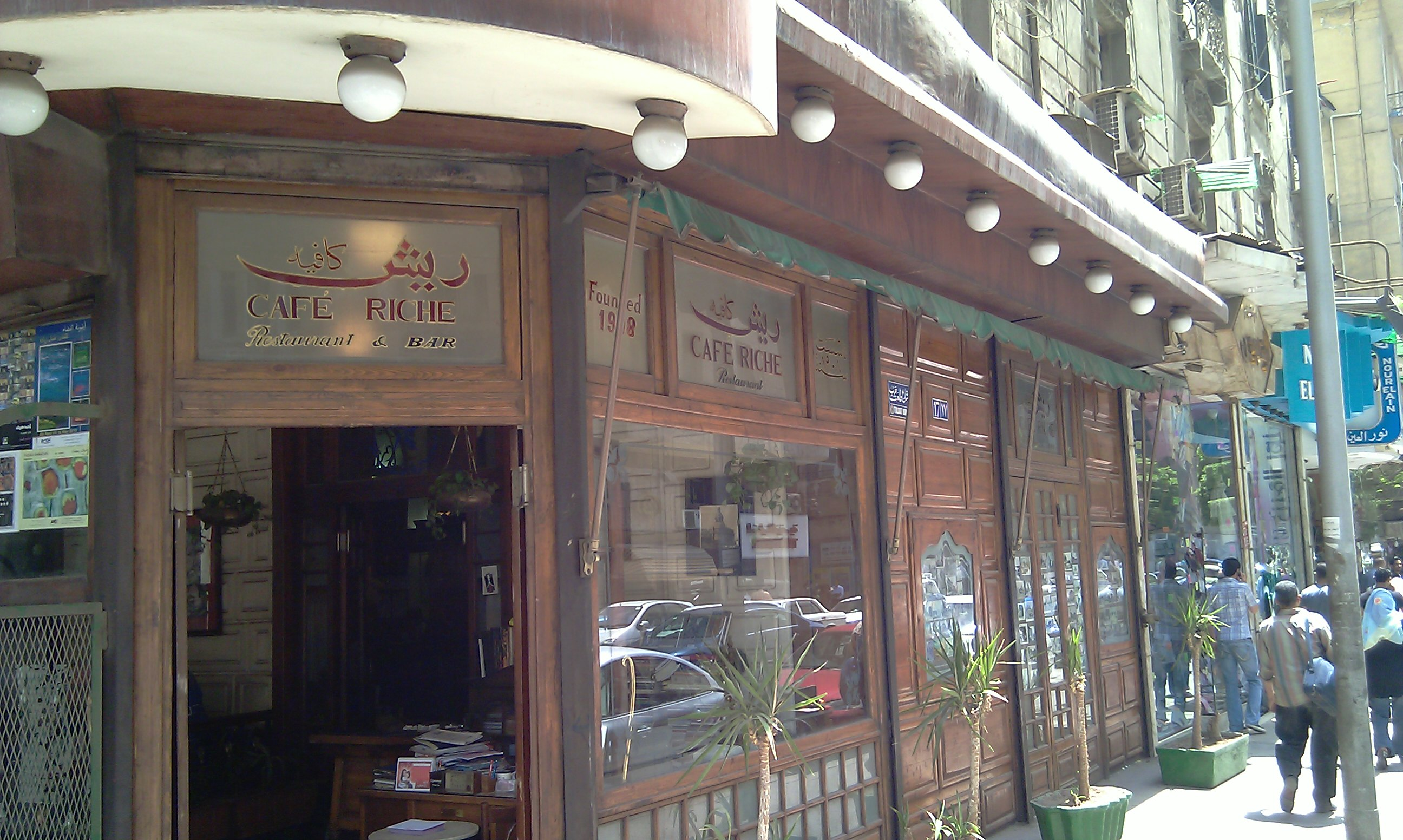
Café Riche

Café Riche (Arabic: مقهى ريش) which opened in 1908 at 17th of Talaat Harb Street, is one of the most renowned landmarks in downtown Cairo. At various times a meeting place for intellectuals and revolutionaries, the café witnessed many historically significant events over the 20th century. It is said to be where King Farouk saw his second wife, Nariman Sadek; where the perpetrator of the 1919 failed assassination attempt on Egypt's last Coptic Prime Minister, Youssef Wahba Pacha lay in wait for his target; and where several members of the resistance during the 1919 revolution met the basement to organize their activities and print their flyers. Patrons included the political novelist Naguib Mahfouz and the then-future president Gamal Abdel Nasser.

== History ==
The café has its origins in 1908, but was not named Café Riche until it was bought in 1914 by Frenchman Henry Recine. Shortly after acquiring the café however, Recine sold it to Michael Nicoapolits from Greece and returned to France. Nicoapolits added theater to the café, bringing in such performers as Monira il-Mahdiyya and Umm Kulthum. On November 4, 1942, Nicoapolits sold the café to George Basile Avayianos, who focused his efforts on adding a restaurant onto the café. In 1962 Avayianos gave the café to Abdel Malek Michael Salib, who became the first native Egyptian to own the café. This change in ownership marked a change in the country too, as Egyptians were starting to take back their country's economic identity from the prominent foreigners who previously controlled many successful businesses.

== Notable events ==
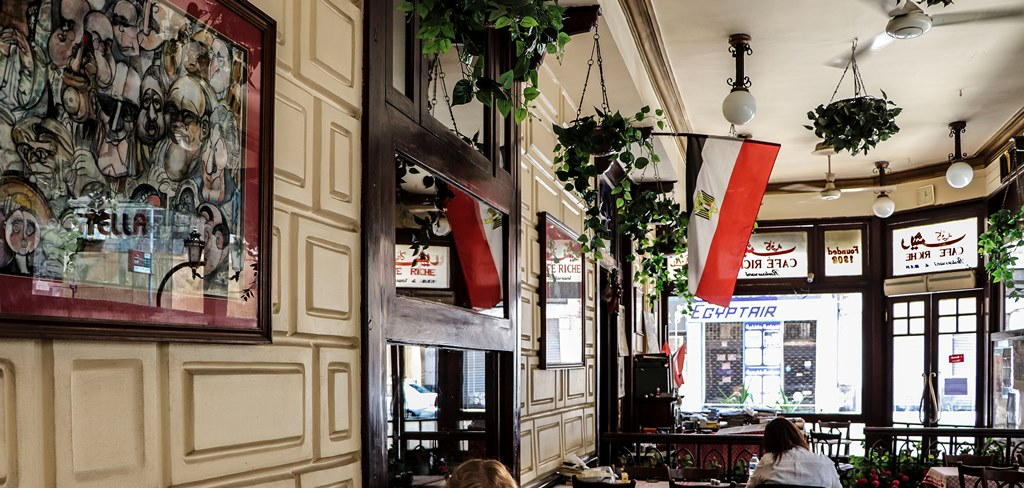
Cairo: Café Riche

Those who frequented the café were mostly of higher socio-economic status. Up until World War II, most of the customers were foreigners living in the country. As ownership changed to native Egyptians, so did the clientele. Cairo became the home to many newspapers, magazines, and law offices helped build up the client base of the café. Its proximity to Soliman-Pasha Square (present Talaat Harb Square) and Tahrir Square made the café a prime location for gatherings. Revolutionaries would meet at the café to plan strategies during the 1919 revolution against the British rule of Egypt. The café was the site of an assassination attempt on the Egyptian Prime Minister on December 19, 1919. Gamal Abdel Nasser was known to frequent the café while planning his 1952 overthrow of King Farouk.

Naguib Mahfouz was one of the most famous intellectuals to frequent the café, so much that Malak would close the café on Fridays to give Mahfouz a place to hold meetings. The political novelist even mentions the café in several of his books and received inspiration for characters from his fellow customers.

== Present day ==
Café Riche was closed for almost a decade in the 1990s. A court case by the Egyptian government was brought against the café about a public passage the café occupied, causing a temporary close. The earthquake of October 1992 caused considerable damage and the café struggled to rebuild. The decline in popularity of the café has been credited to the rise of digital media. Formal meeting places like cafés have taken a backseat to online platforms and groups. Café Riche was a hub for large literary and intellectual groups to meet, but also youth in general. With the emergence of large shopping malls, small businesses are no longer the major gathering place for the younger generation, as it once was. Yet, during the 2011 revolution it served as a refuge to the many protesters in the city.
