= Sabag =

Sabag (Hebrew: סבג) is an Israeli surname adapted from the Arabic surname Sabbagh (صباغ, 'dyer'). Notable people with the name include:

- Doron Sabag, Israeli art patron and businessman
- Fernando André Sabag Montiel (born 1987), a Brazilian man who attempted to murder Argentine former president Cristina Fernández de Kirchner
- Hosain Sabag (born 1937), Chilean politician
- Mike and Erik Sabag, Israeli businessmen, owners of the original company which was the basis of Moroccanoil
- Moshe Sabag (born 1973), Israeli football player
- Randa Chahal Sabag (1953–2008), Lebanese film director, producer and screenwriter
- Shem-Tov Sabag (born 1959), Israeli Olympic marathoner

== See also ==
- Qutluğ Säbäg Qatun
- Sabbagh
