= Talaat Harb Street =

Street in Cairo, Egypt

Coordinates: 30.048912°N 31.239524°E

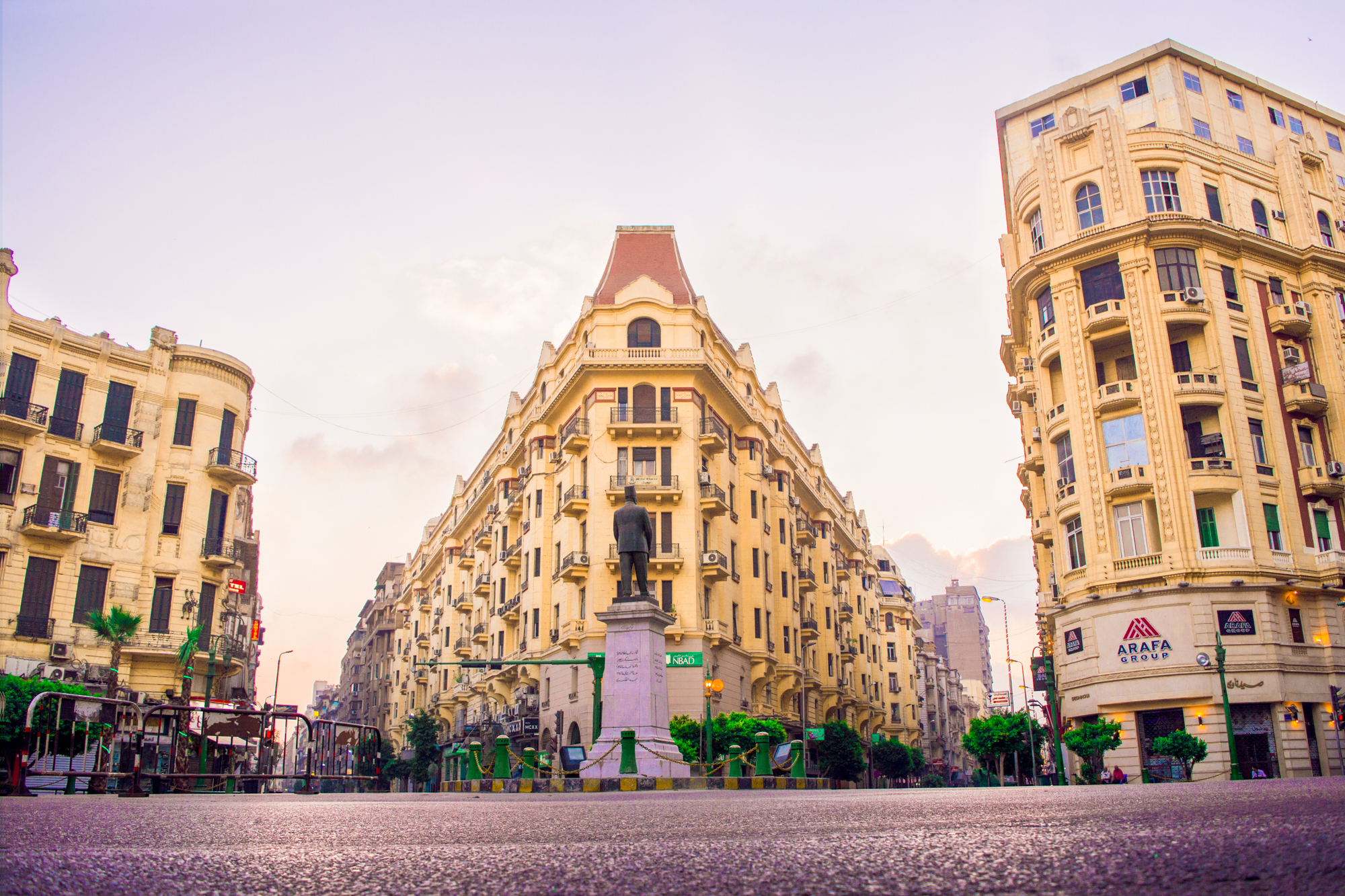
Talaat Harb Square, with the statue of Talaat Harb in the center and Talaat Harb Street on the left

Talaat Harb Street (Arabic: شارع طلعت حرب pronounced [ˈtˤɑlʕɑt ˈħɑɾb]) is a historic street in downtown Cairo, Egypt, connecting Tahrir Square and Talaat Harb Square.

== Naming ==
Originally it was named 'Soliman Pasha Street' after Suleiman Pasha, Egypt's French-born General under Muhammad Ali. The street was renamed in 1954 after Talaat Harb, the leading Egyptian economist of the early 1900s. The street received the 'Talaat Harb Street' name during a sweeping effort by Egypt’s new president, Gamal Abdel Nasser, to rid the city of all reminders of the Muhammad Ali dynasty and British occupation era.

== Architecture ==
It is the historic architecture lining Talaat Harb Street that reminds visitors of its stylistic and eventful past. Until its name change in 1954, this avenue was named 'Soliman Pasha Street' and was a center for activity and social interaction among Cairo's upper and European classes. A remnant of its 19th century planning, the Midan Talaat, or Talaat Square, at the street's intersection with Qasr el-Nil Street, is circled with buildings in French neoclassical style from the Soliman Pasha era.

Despite Nasser's attempt to mask colonial Egypt's history in the 1950s and 1960s, the structural design of the upper building facades on Talaat Harb Street retains characteristics of the colonial era. Various types of architecture representing different eras are displayed on the floors above the new store facades at street level. Most of these buildings appear to be left over from the days of Khedive Ismail and his goal to create a new European-inspired quarter in Cairo during the second half of the 19th century. He stressed urban planning for the first time in Cairo to include broad, linear gridded streets, open spaces and parks, geometric balance and harmony, and then modern European architectural styles.

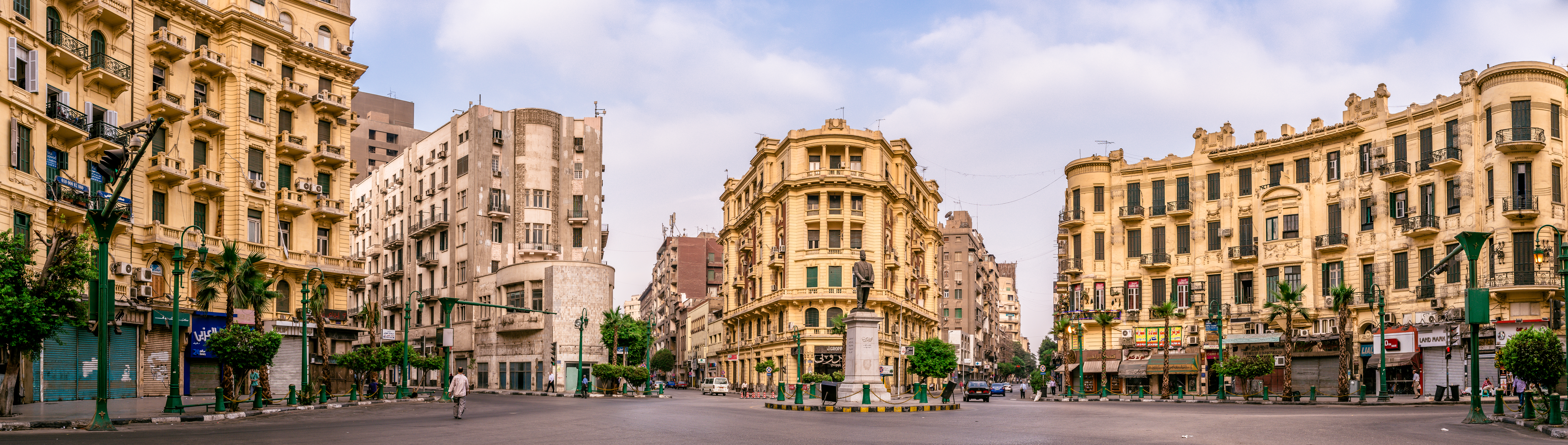
Panoramic view of Talaat Harb Square

== Historic establishments ==
=== Groppi ===
Street facade of J.Groppi chocolatier and cafe

J. Groppi, the once world famous chocolatier, still holds its place in the midan on Talaat Harb Street, without its former global prominence. In the late 1920s Groppi opened a shop in Soliman Pasha square and continued conducting business with Egypt's elite. Established in the early 1900s, Groppi was once "the most celebrated tearoom this side of the Mediterranean" and was repeatedly the shop of choice for gifts among royalty, including princess Margaret and Elizabeth of England.

=== Egyptian Diplomatic Club ===
The Egyptian Diplomatic Club

The Egyptian Diplomatic Club is located at the intersection of Talaat Harb Street and Abdel Salaam Arif Street in downtown Cairo. The club hosts meetings and events for members of the diplomatic community and publishes a monthly political magazine.

=== Café Riche ===
Café Riche

Café Riche, a Greek owned establishment founded in 1921, no longer occupies its original space on the square. Café Riche became a popular venue for many rising performers, among them the celebrated Umm Kulthum. It was a frequented locale for some of Cairo's more privileged men. In December 1919, it became the site for an assassination attempt on Egypt's last Coptic Prime Minister, Youssef Wahba Pasha. The assassin had waited for his target inside Café Riche, but his attempt failed. It is in a nearby location.

== Public use – demonstrations ==
This mile-long stretch has not only erected history in walls of concrete, but witnessed its movements develop between its roughly defined curbs. At the center of the city, Talaat Harb has been host to countless demonstrations in the nation’s turbulent political past. During one example, in 2005, protesters demonstrating against President Mubarak’s announcement that he would be running for a fifth term of office gathered in Tahrir Square and spilled onto Talaat Harb and into Talaat Harb Square. The demonstration ended in the arrest of 40 persons by plain clothes security officers. This demonstration was led by the grassroots opposition group Kefaya (English: Enough).
