= Arts Professional =

Sector publication for arts

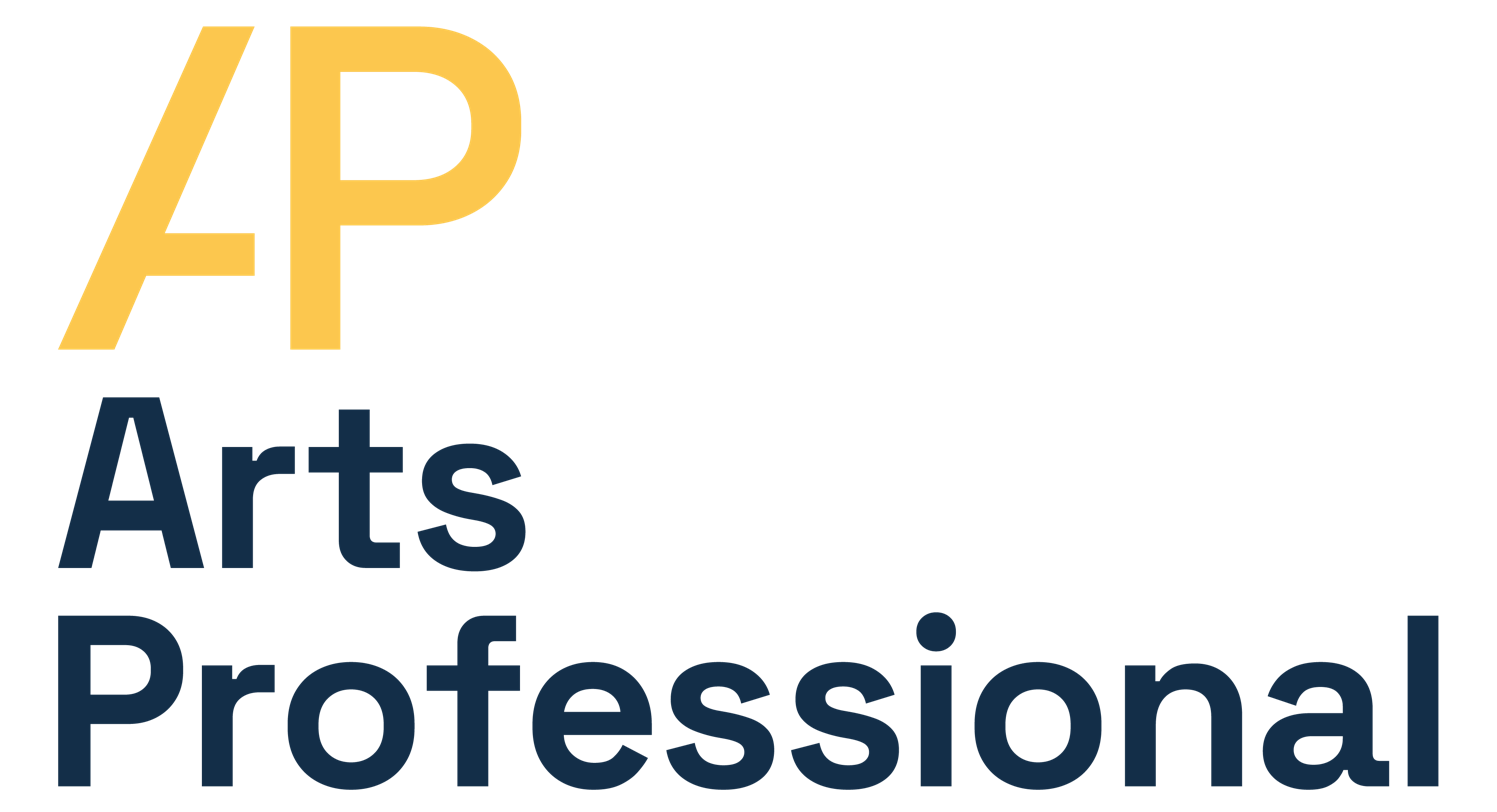
- Website type: Journalism
- Available in: English
- Owner: Arts Professional Media Ltd
- Founders: Liz Hill and Brian Whitehead
- Editor: Ruth Hogarth
- Website: Official website
- Commercial: Yes
- Registration: Yes
- Launched: May 2001
- Current status: Active

Arts Professional is an online publication for people working in the UK arts and cultural sector, covering the management and administration of arts, culture, and heritage. It was launched in 2001 in Cambridge, England by Liz Hill and Brian Whitehead, as a print magazine.

The UK press regulator Impress describes the publication's purpose as delivering "quality news, comment and information" for professionals, alongside a "noticeboard" for jobs and professional development opportunities.

According to the publication's own reporting, it had 66,266 monthly online readers as of 2024.

== Influence on public policy ==
The publication's coverage has been referenced in UK parliamentary proceedings and government research. In January 2024, a House of Lords Library briefing on the arts and economy drew upon Arts Professional's reporting on cultural sector funding, while parliamentary debates have incorporated data from the publication, including a November 2021 House of Lords debate on creative sector funding in which Lord Foster of Bath cited Arts Professional figures and a March 2026 House of Lords debate on English Devolution in which the Earl of Clancarty cited an Arts Professional article on the risks of excluding culture from the English Devolution and Community Empowerment Bill.

In February 2024, The Guardian and Evening Standard identified Arts Professional as the source of coverage of an Arts Council England policy controversy regarding political statements. BBC News has also cited Arts Professional in its cultural sector coverage.

== Research ==
Arts Professional conducts sector-specific research published under the title Pulse. These reports examine issues affecting cultural workers in the UK. The publication's 2020 "Freedom of Expression?" survey examined self-censorship among arts professionals. Survey respondents reported concerns about funding implications, public reactions, and institutional responses affecting their work.

Arts Professional's "ArtsPay 2022" survey examined earnings in the UK arts sector and documented salary variations and employment conditions across different roles and employment types. In 2025, Baroness Hodge's independent review of Arts Council England cited the publication's ArtsPay 2025 survey as evidence of a "burnout crisis" affecting the UK arts sector.

The publication's research and reporting have served as reference material for other arts journals. The artists' network a-n has drawn upon Arts Professional's sector surveys, while publications such as ArtReview have referenced its coverage when reporting on arts policy developments.

== Notable contributors ==
Arts Professional has featured articles by figures from the UK cultural sector, including Arts Council England Chief Executive Darren Henley, author and broadcaster John Kampfner, and double bassist Chi-chi Nwanoku, founder of the Chineke! Foundation.

== Editorial leadership ==
Founding co-editor Liz Hill stepped down in 2019 after multiple periods overseeing the publication's content. During her tenure, Hill led the publication's transition from print journal to an online resource.

Arts Professional Media Ltd has published the title since June 2021, described in a recruitment notice as "an editorially independent company" within the Baker Richards Employee Ownership Trust group. In 2023, the publication became regulated by Impress, the independent press regulator.

Editors include:

- Liz Hill (2001–January 2008, 2010–2017, 2018–2019, 2020–2021): Founding editor of Arts Professional, serving from its launch in 2001 and returning to the role as Consulting Editor or Managing Editor. Brian Whitehead is listed as co-editor until issue 144 in April 2007.
- Nick Jordan served as editor from issue 145 in May 2007 until issue 158 in November 2007
- Catherine Rose (January 2008 – 2010): Served as editor from January 2008 until 2010, when she was succeeded by Nosheen Iqbal.
- Nosheen Iqbal (2010): Appointed editor in March 2010, taking over from Catherine Rose. She later departed the role in November 2010.
- Frances Richens (2017–2018): Appointed editor in October 2017.
- Amanda Parker (2019–2020): Took over as editor in July 2019, following the departure of Frances Richens. She stepped down in September 2020.
- Ruth Hogarth (2021–present): Appointed editor in February 2021.

Brian Whitehead was Publisher from the founding of the publication until May 2021. Robin Cantrill-Fenwick was appointed Publisher in June 2021 when ownership of the title passed to Arts Professional Media ltd.
