= Qasr El Nil Bridge =

Qasr El Nil Asr El Nil
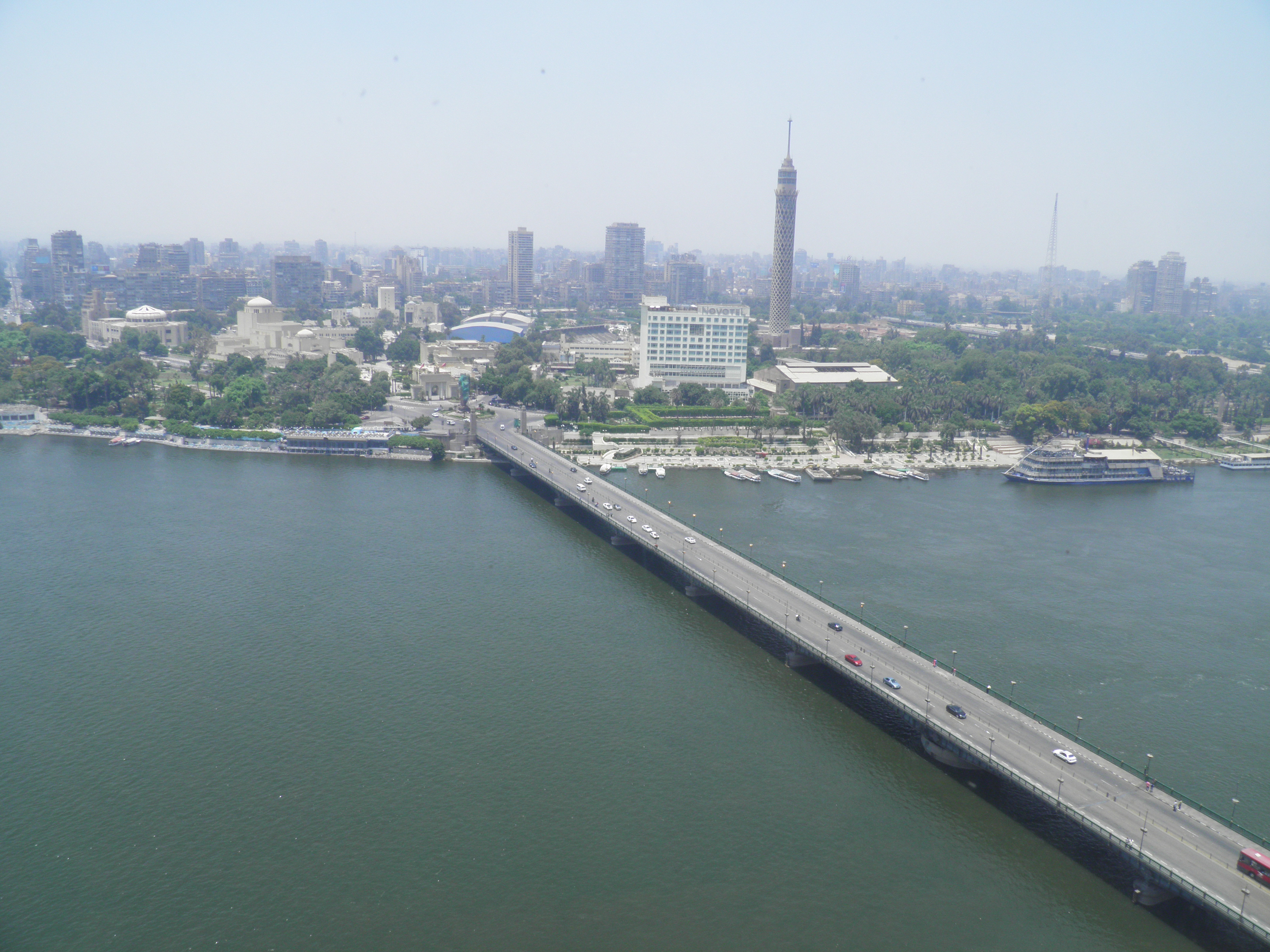
- View of the Qasr El Nil Bridge, with Gezira/Zamalek Island in the background
- Coordinates: 30.043747°N 31.229464°E
- Carries: Tahrir Street
- Crosses: Nile River

Characteristics
- Design: swing bridge, arch
- Material: Steel
- Total length: 1 932 m
- No. of spans: 7

History
- Designer: Ralph Anthony Freeman
- Engineering design by: Dorman, Long and Co. Ltd.
- Construction start: 1931
- Construction end: 1933
- Construction cost: E£308,000
- Opened: June 6, 1933
- Replaces: El Gezira Bridge (1872)

Location
- Interactive map of Qasr El Nil

The Qasr el Nil Bridge (originally named Khedive Ismail Bridge, Egyptian Arabic: Asr el Nil Bridge), is a historic swing bridge structure dating from 1931 which replaced the first bridge to span the Nile River in central Cairo, Egypt. It connects Tahrir Square in Downtown Cairo on the east bank of the river, to the southern end of Gezira/Zamalek Island. At the bridge's east and west approaches are four large bronze lion statues; they are late 19th-century works by Henri Alfred Jacquemart, French sculptor and animalier.

== Route ==
Qasr El Nil Street crosses over the Nile on the bridge, from the east bank area Tahrir Square—Liberation Square in downtown Cairo, past the huge Mogamma government building and the headquarters of the Arab League, then onto the Qasr El Nil Bridge over the river to Gezira Island. There it meets Opera Square and the Cairo Opera House, with connections north to the Cairo Tower and the Zamalek district, and south across the island to the Tahrir Bridge across a smaller branch of the Nile to Tahrir Street in the Agouza district on the west bank.

== Construction and name ==
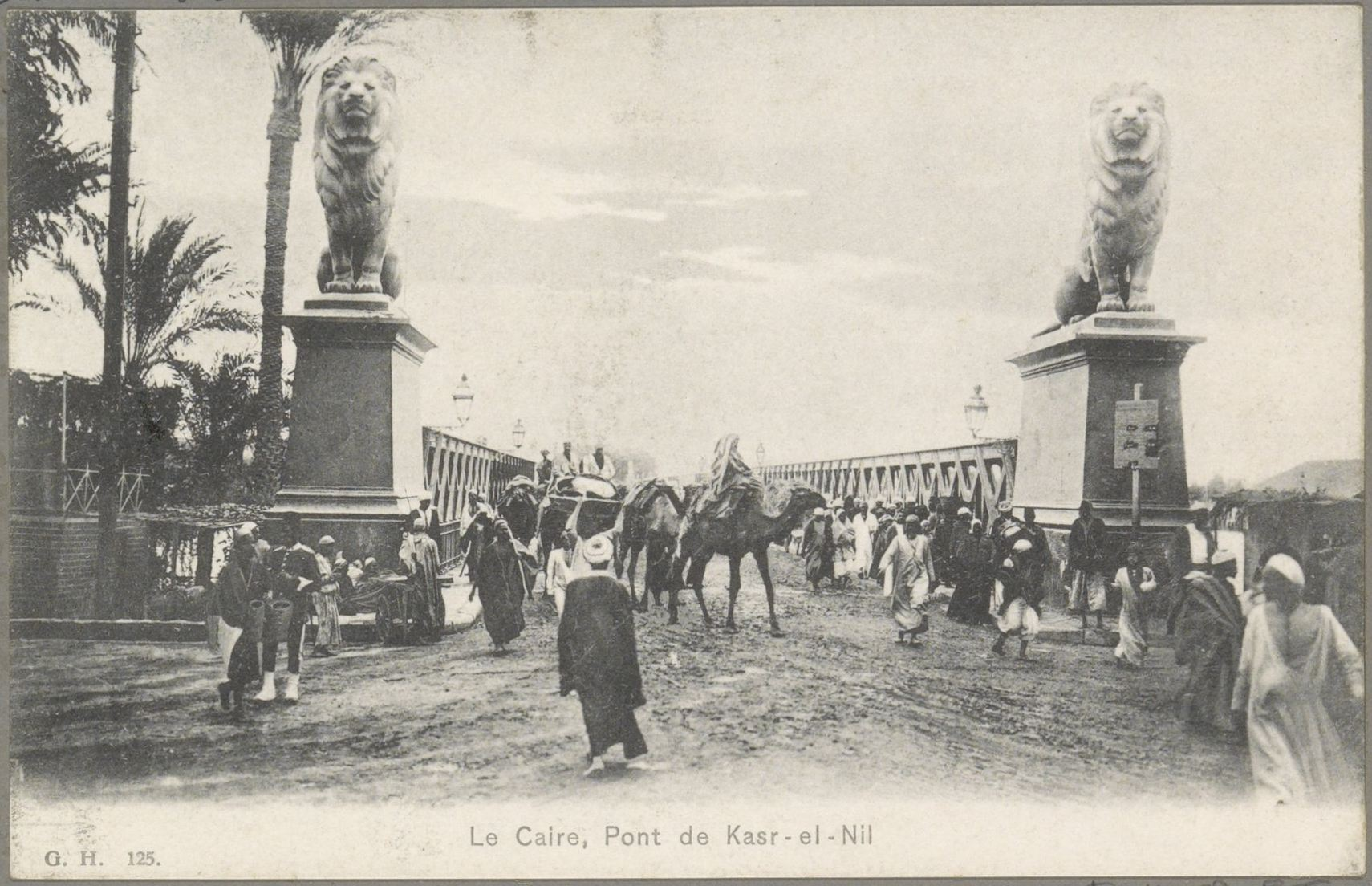
Eastern entrance to Al-Gezira Bridge, ca.1895

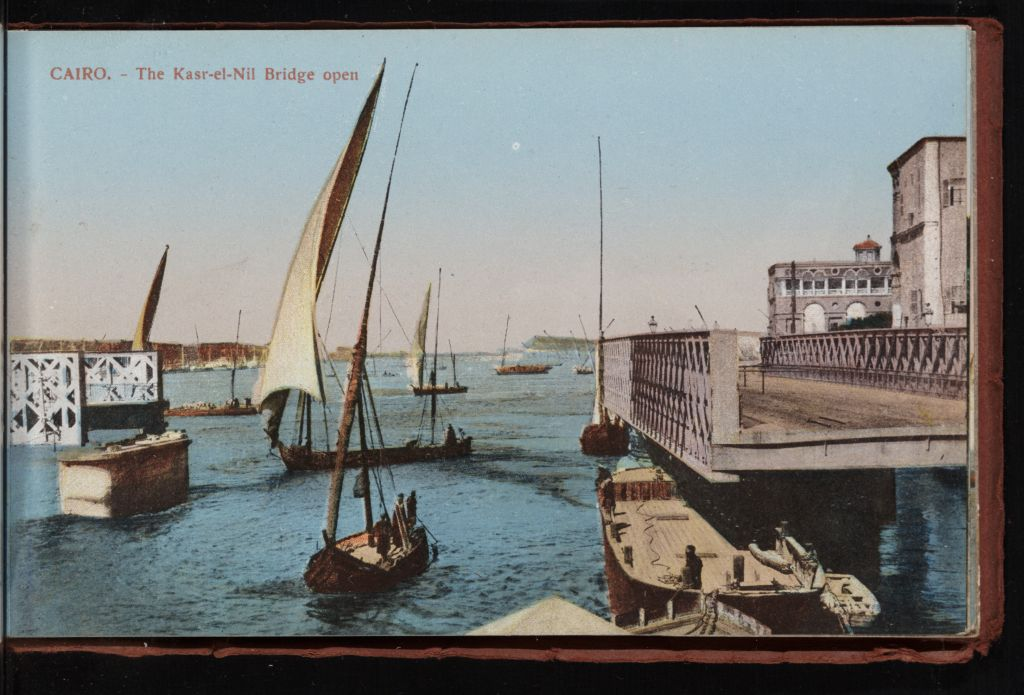
El-Gezira Bridge swings open, n.d.

The previous bridge on the site, El Gezira Bridge, was a swing bridge built from 1869 to 1871 by Linant de Bellefonds with the participation of France's Five-Lilles Company.

The foundation stone for the present Qasr El Nil Bridge was laid by King Fuad I on February 4, 1931. It was also a swing bridge, though almost double as wide as the original, and after over two years of construction, undertaken by Dorman Long & Co. Ltd, King Fuad inaugurated the bridge's opening on June 6, 1933.

The bridge was originally named Khedive Ismail Bridge after King Fuad's father, Khedive Isma'il Pasha. After the Egyptian Revolution of 1952, the bridge was renamed, along with other Egyptian buildings and bridges. This bridge was renamed Qasr El Nil in Arabic, which translates to Palace of the Nile.

== Public use and demonstrations ==
The Qasr El Nil Bridge is popular for strolling in the evenings.

== In popular culture ==
The Qasr El Nil Bridge is featured in the Japanese anime and manga JoJo's Bizarre Adventure: Stardust Crusaders as the site of the final showdown between Jotaro Kujo and Dio Brando. Because of this, the bridge is also known by many anime fans as the "Jotaro versus Dio" bridge.

== Gallery ==
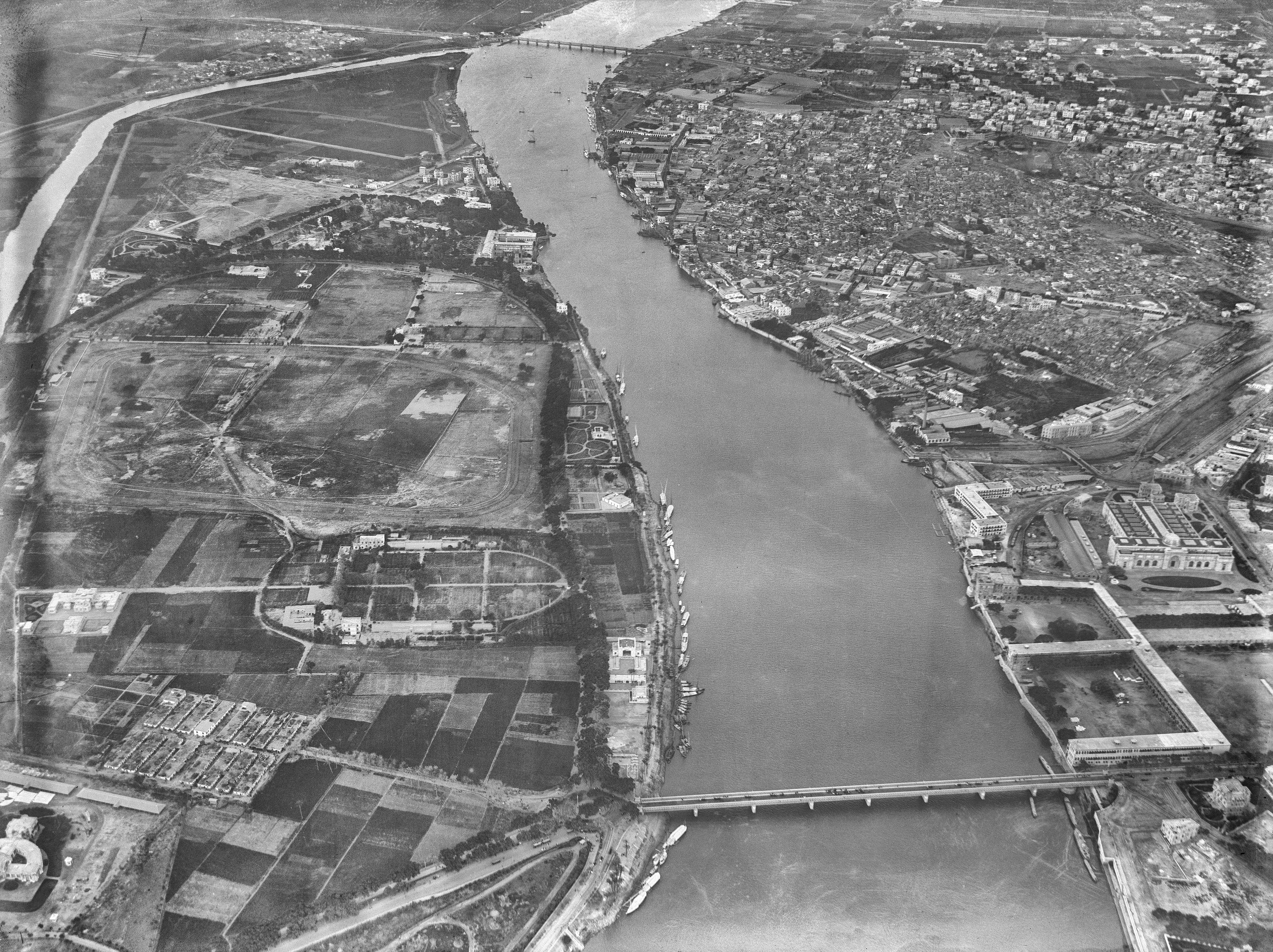
Al Gezira Bridge (bottom right) in 1904

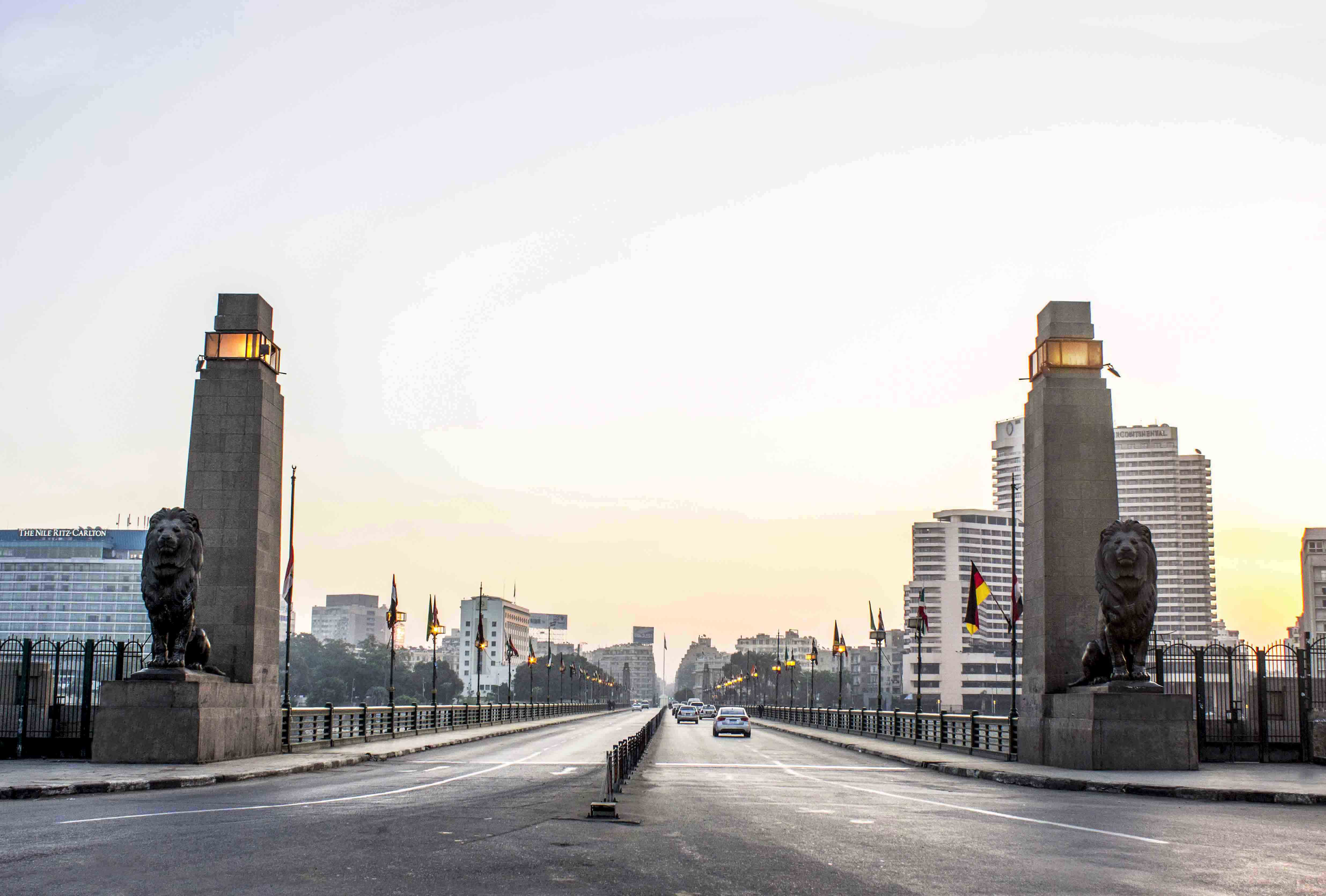
The Qasr El Nil Bridge entrance

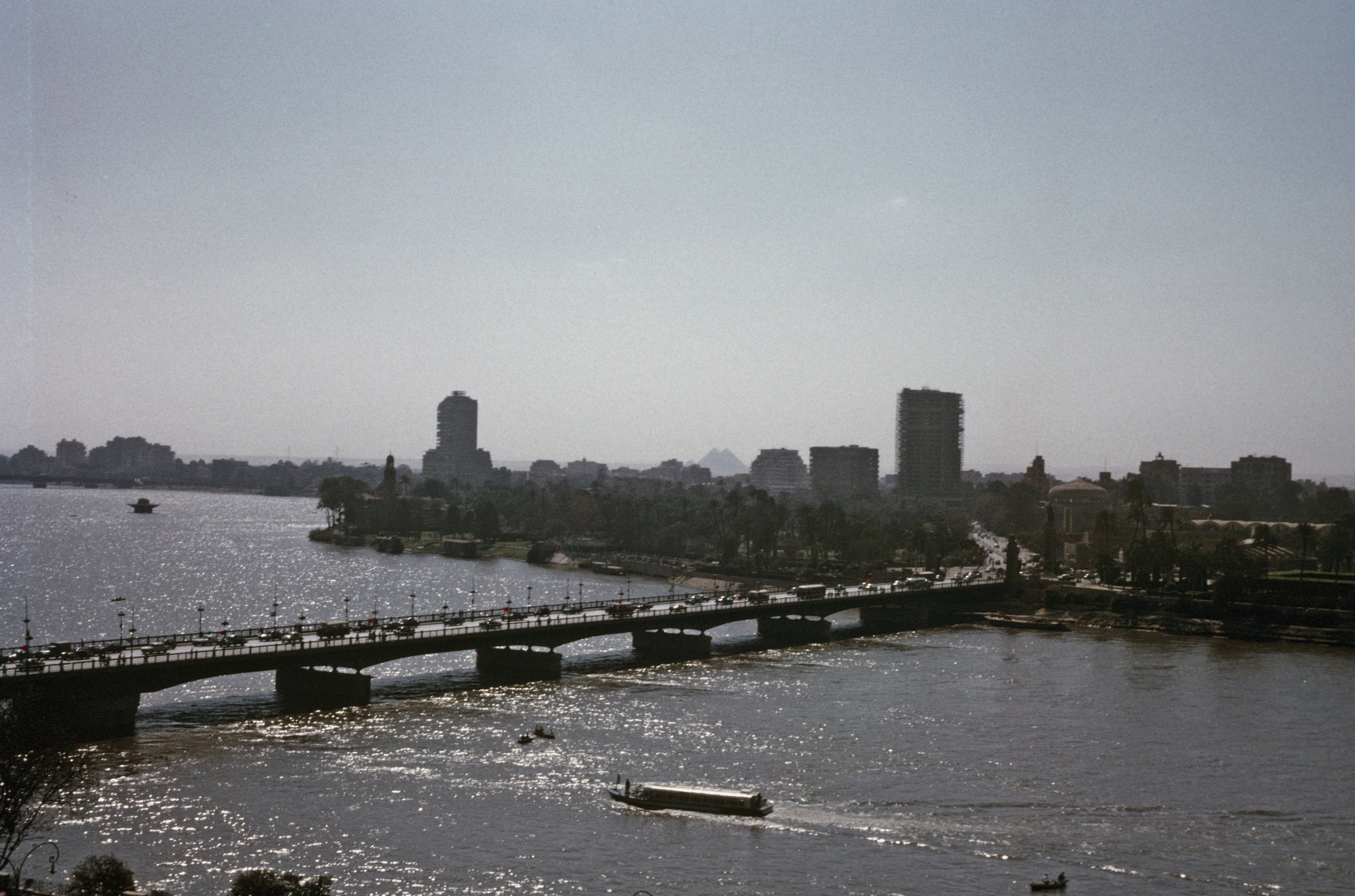
View of the bridge, 1965

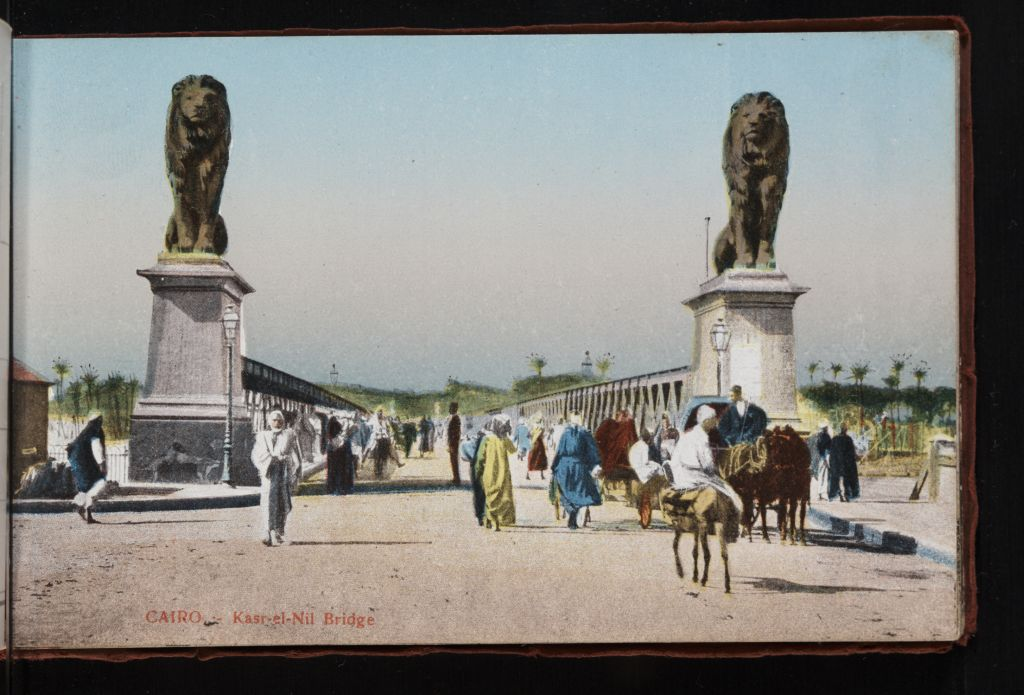
View of western bridge end with lions (circa 1930s)

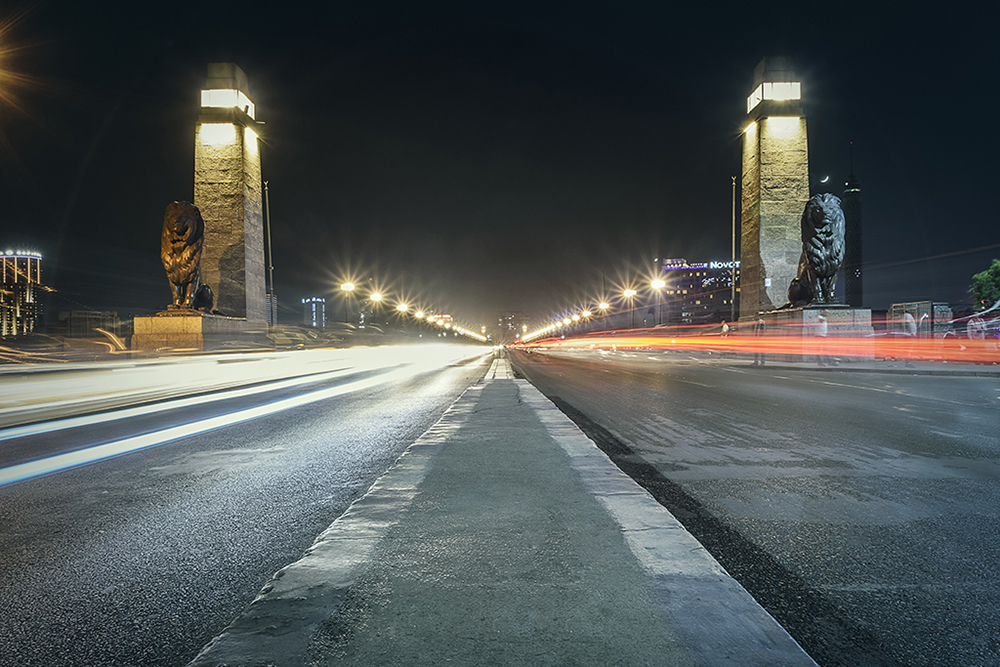
The bridge at night

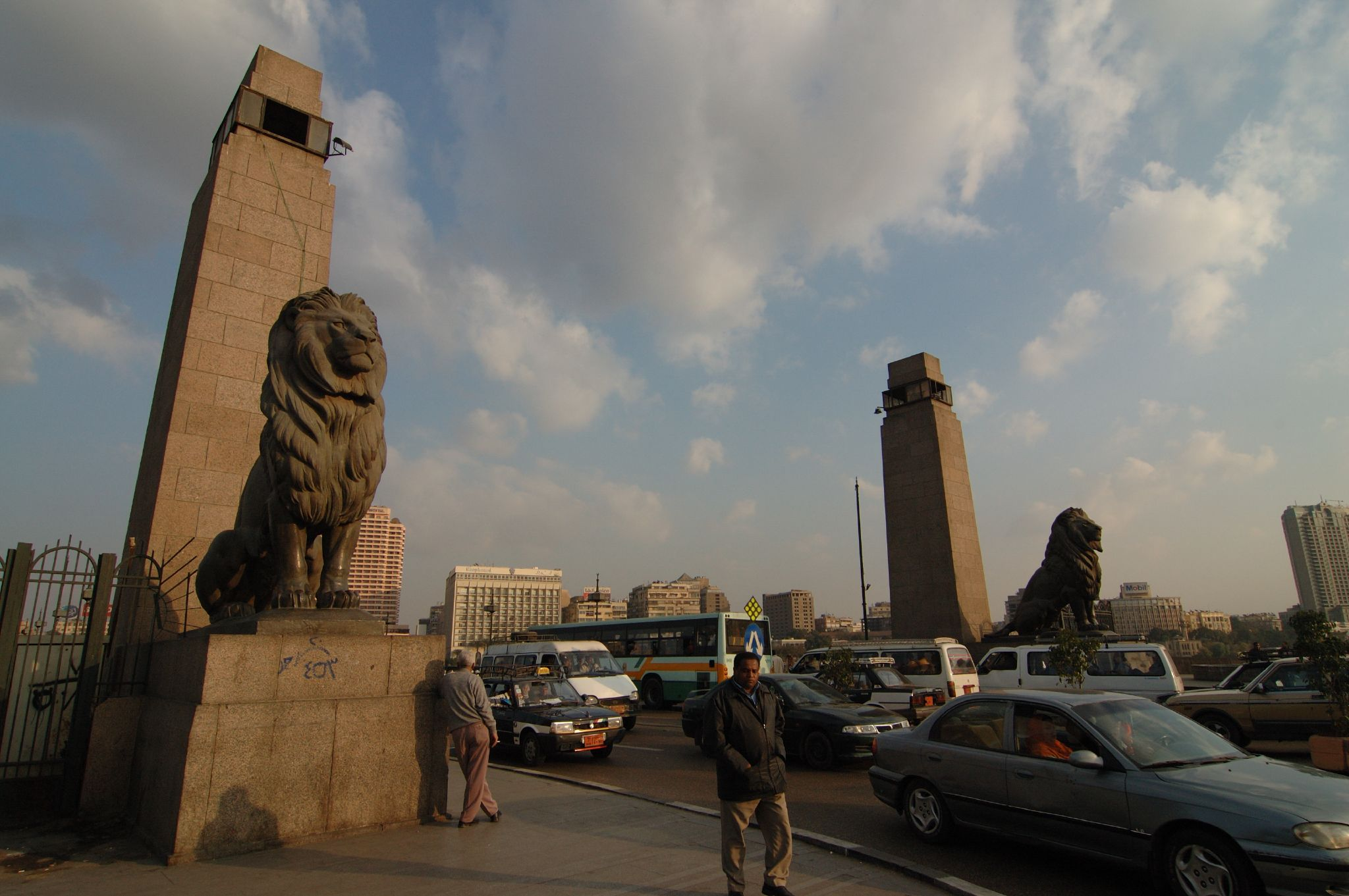
View of eastern bridge end with obelisks and lions, circa 2000s

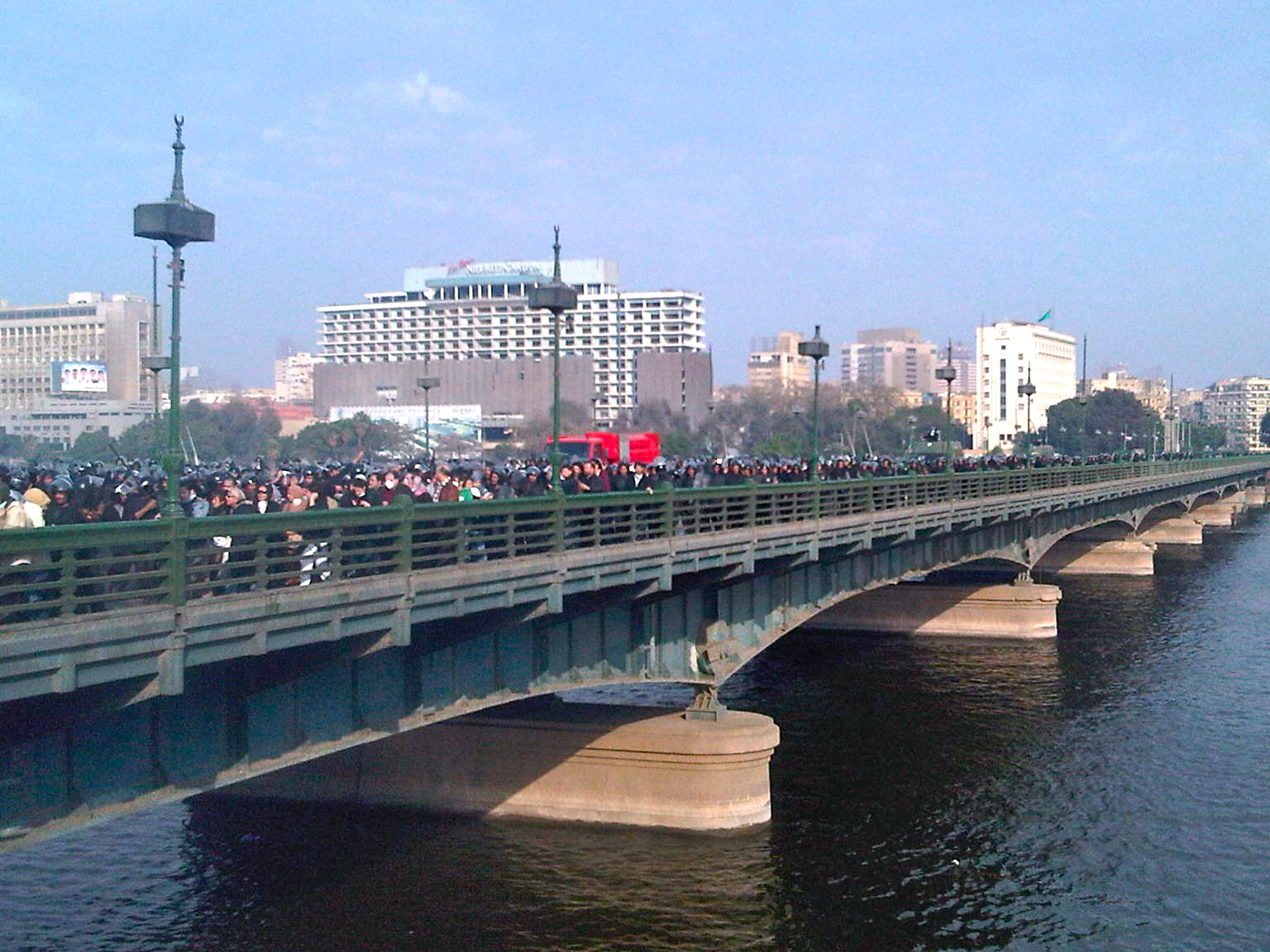
Crowds and police on the bridge during the 2011 Egyptian revolution
