= Qasr El Nil Street =

Street In Egypt

Qasr El Nil Street, seen from Talaat Harb Square

Qasr El Nil Street (Arabic: شارع قصر النيل, lit. 'Nile Palace street') is a street in downtown Cairo, Egypt. It is one of the most important streets in this area, with many businesses, restaurants, and an active nightlife.

The vintage urban planning and architecture here are reminiscent of the late 19th and early 20th century European Beaux-Arts and Egyptian—Islamic—Moorish Revival styles. The street and its new building designs were created as part of a new international downtown district at the turn of the 20th century in Cairo. It shares its name with the nearby Qasr El Nil Bridge.

== Geography ==
From east to west, Qasr El Nil Street begins near Opera Square, passes through Mustafa Kemal Square, through the Bab al-Louq district, crosses Talaat Harb Street at Talaat Harb Square, and ends at Tahrir Square.

== History ==
=== Isma'il Pasha and Ismailiya era ===
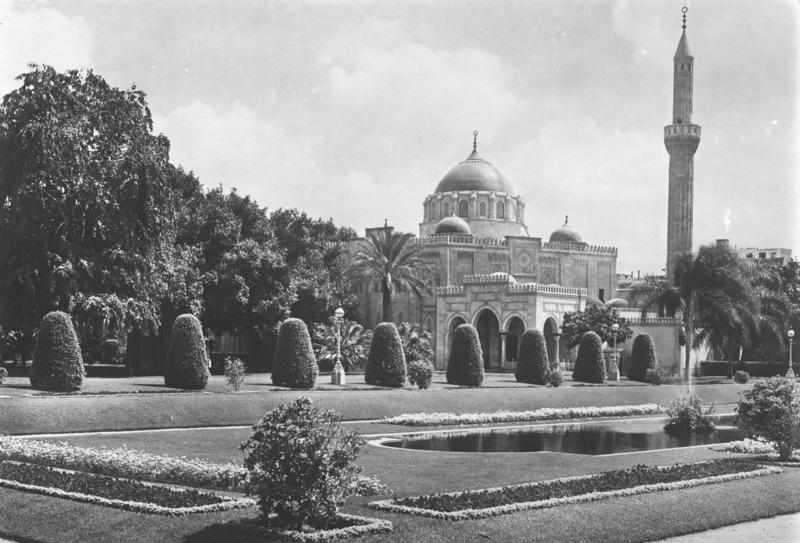
The Abdeen Palace and its gardens, above the eastern end of Qasr El Nil Street (circa early 1900s).

Isma'il Pasha, the ruler of Egypt, decided to strategically reclaim the east bank of the Nile opposite Gezira Island and create a 'Paris on the Nile.' The lower area was part of the Nile's natural pond, marsh, wetland, and riparian zone habitats for millennia, making this an ambitious civil engineering project. The existing 1880s Khairy Pasha palace was higher in the eastern Tahrir Square area, and later was absorbed into the American University in Cairo downtown campus. This urban project's starting point was building the Egyptian Army Barracks, which became an important Egyptian and later British government institution. This area was eventually part of the urban district called 'Ismailiya' and 617 acres (2.50 km^{2}) were allocated for this new neighborhood in which Qasr el Nil Street was centered. After adequate civic infrastructure was completed in 1874, Ismail Pasha decided that buildings had to cost a minimum 2000 L.E. amount of money to build and furnish. The large sum for the time was intended to ensure that the buildings in the Ismailiya district would be significant, large and built with expensive materials, and therefore excluding small shops and houses. Throughout its early years the street attracted many of the Egyptian elites, socialites, celebrities, and businesspeople, who caused a commercialization and development movement from the street beyond into the district that was rising to become classic downtown Cairo.

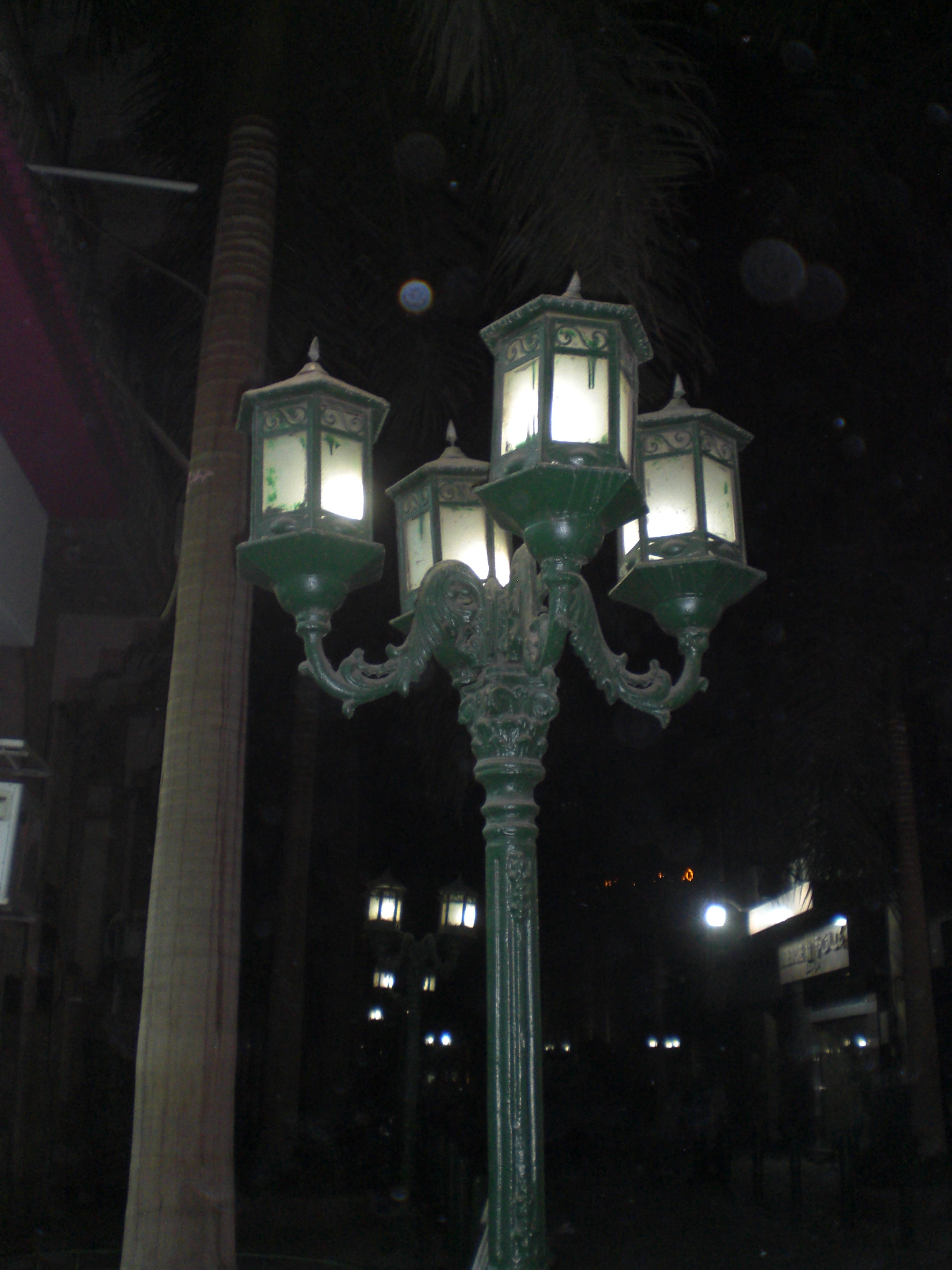
Historic circa early 1900s Beaux-arts lanterns and lamppost on Qasr el Nil Street.

=== British and independence eras ===
When the British arrived to oversee Egypt in 1882, their first decision was to occupy the Egyptian Army Barracks on the Nile. Khedive Tawfiq disbanded the Egyptian Army five days later to humiliate the Egyptian officers who demonstrated against their own army. After many years of British occupation, King Farouk reclaimed the Barracks structures in 1948, but relocated the new Egyptian Army Barracks east to the Abbassia district. The site of the Egyptian Army Barracks was first then converted into a municipality building of Cairo (later the Nile Hilton site), changing central Qasr El Nil Street from a military to civilian character thereafter. The adjacent Midan Ismailiyya square, later renamed as Tahrir Square—Liberation Square, was expanded after some of the British barracks demolition 'liberated' space for Cairenes.

=== Recent history and present day ===
The Qasr el Nil British Army Barracks were demolished in 1947 and replaced by an expanded Tahrir Square and the early 1950s modernist Nile Hilton Hotel complex.

A recent event here was the anti-Algerian riots that targeted an Algerian airline in the fallout of the events that took place during the World Cup qualification matches. The street was also involved in the 2011 Egyptian protests for democracy, especially the section near Tahrir Square.

== Architecture ==
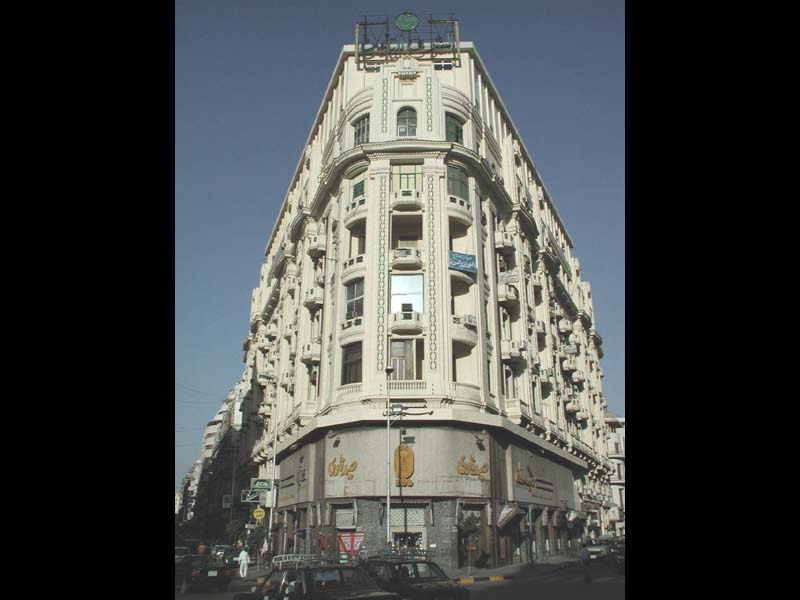
The Beaux-Arts style Sednaoui Department Store, on eastern Qasr El Nil Street.

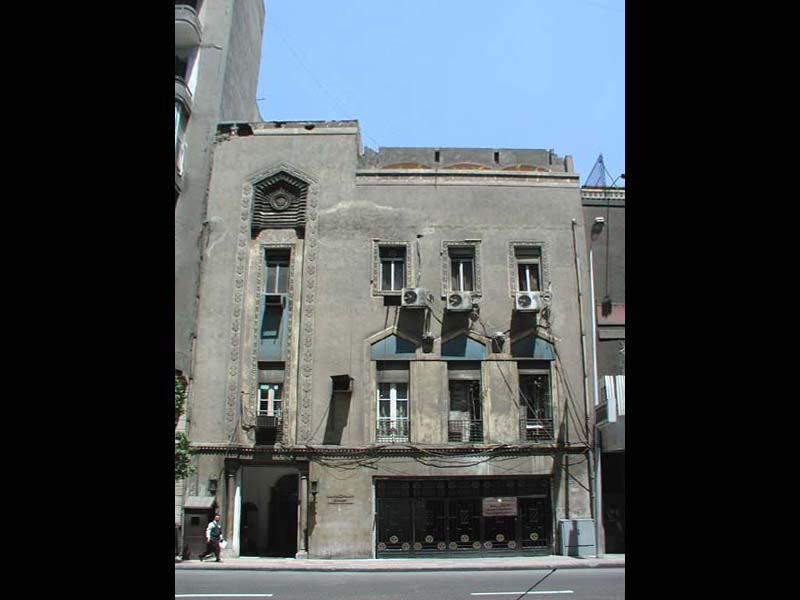
The Neo-Islamic style Royal Automobile Club, on central Qasr El Nil Street.

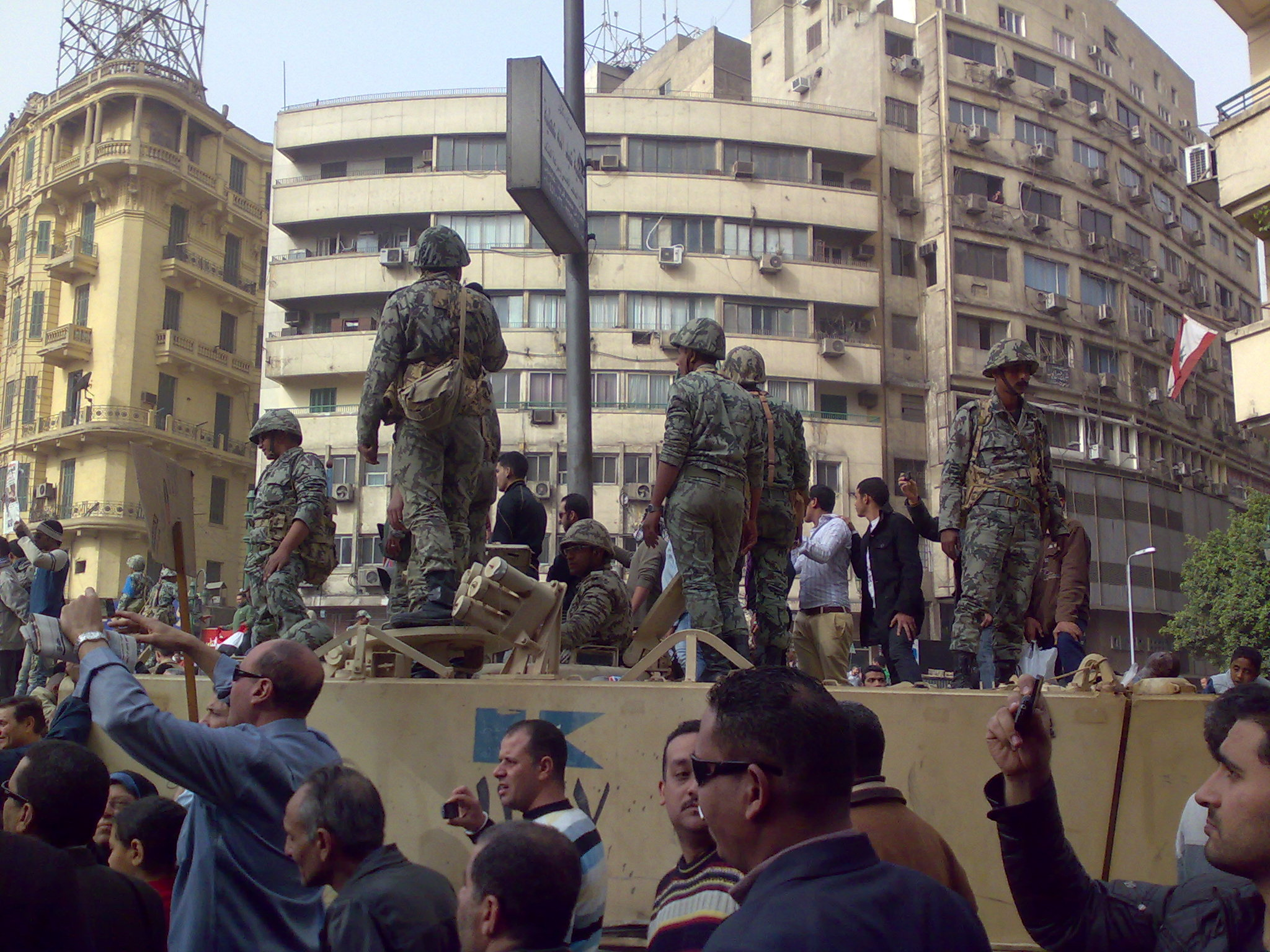
Meeting of Qasr El Nil Street and Talaat Harb Street at entry into Tahrir Square, shown during a 2011 Egyptian protest demonstration.

Qasr El Nil Street's original architecture is reminiscent of European Beaux-Arts, Neo-Baroque, Art Nouveau, and Modernisme, and Art Deco architectural influences, with some Egyptian, Islamic, and Moorish Revival architectural styles, and recent modernist buildings as well.

=== Landmarks ===
Some of the landmarks on or near Qasr El Nil Street, from east to west, include:

- The Sednaoui Department Store is a famous department store built in the 1920s by an Italian architect. This building is a good example on the street of the unique blend of an elaborate Beaux-Arts style with Art Deco detailed decoration on the building's facade. The interior has a clear layout and style, and employed elevators in a store for the first time in Egypt. They provided the public easy access to many upper shopping floors, which are now is ubiquitous in megastores.
- The Royal Automobile Club was built in the 1920s by an Italian architect but displays a different influence namely the Neo-Islamic style. The architecture of this building is specifically of Fatimid influence, evident in the keel arches and sunburst motif on the façade. This club was a popular social club in addition to being a popular night spot for the affluent in Egypt during the first half of the 20th century.
- Bella Studio is one of the oldest and most well known photographic studios in Egypt. Since it opened it has specialized in photo shoots for international socialites, Cairene celebrities, and Egyptian performers and actors. The photography studio and gallery is located in the basement of a building which was designed in the Neo-Renaissance style, and built by a wealthy Italian developer living in Cairo into the 1950s. The balconies are intricately detailed with artistic decoration, and its facades have colored stone mosaics with the owner's Italian name written in Kufi script. The building was nationalized and is now owned by the Central Bank of Egypt, with only one elderly resident refusing to leave residence in Qasr el Nil Street.
- Tahrir Square lies at the west end of the street and is surrounded by numerous major andmarks, including the Egyptian Museum.

== See also ==
- Qasr El Ayni Street
- Abdeen Palace Incident of 1942
