= Alexandria =

City in Egypt

Alexandria الإسكندرية
- City
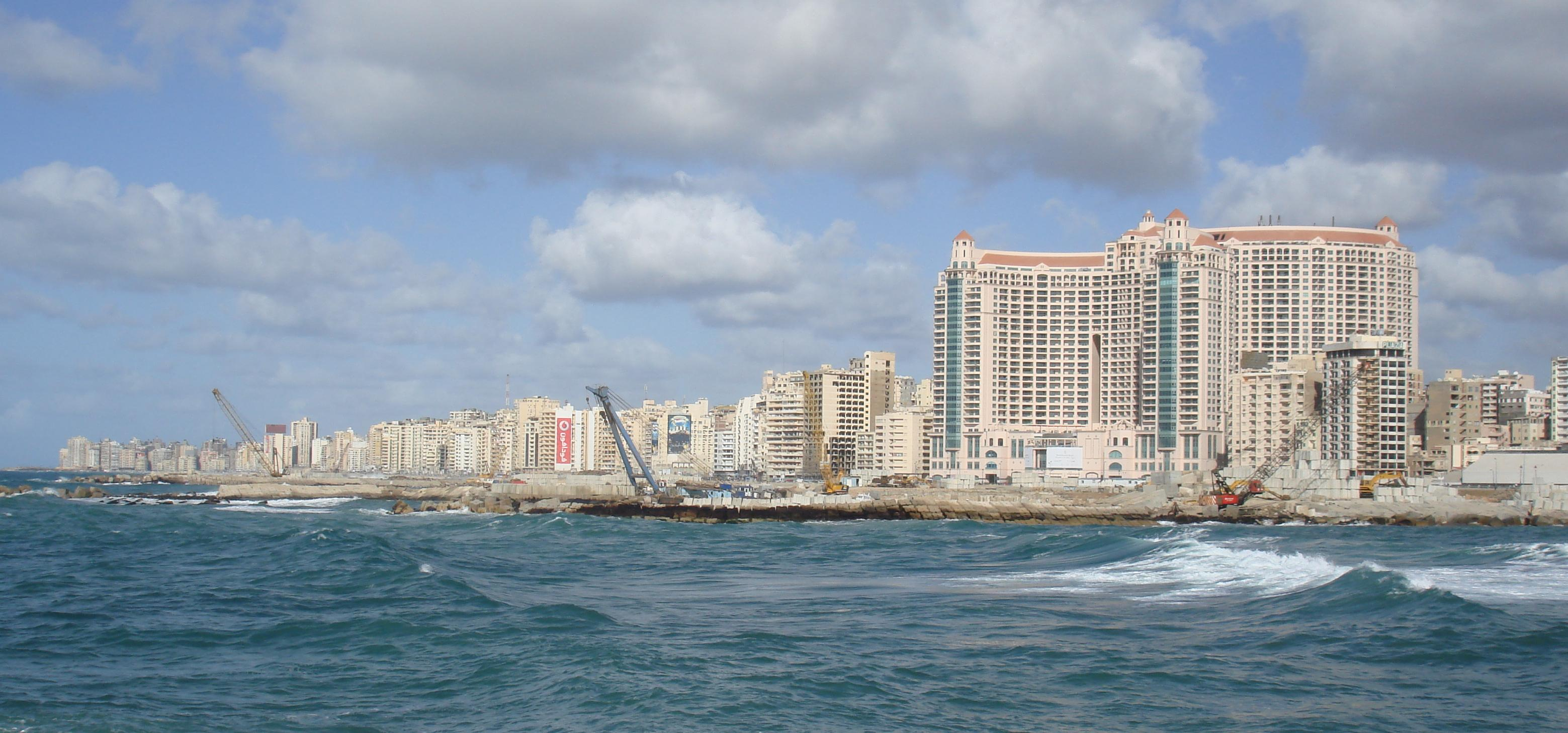
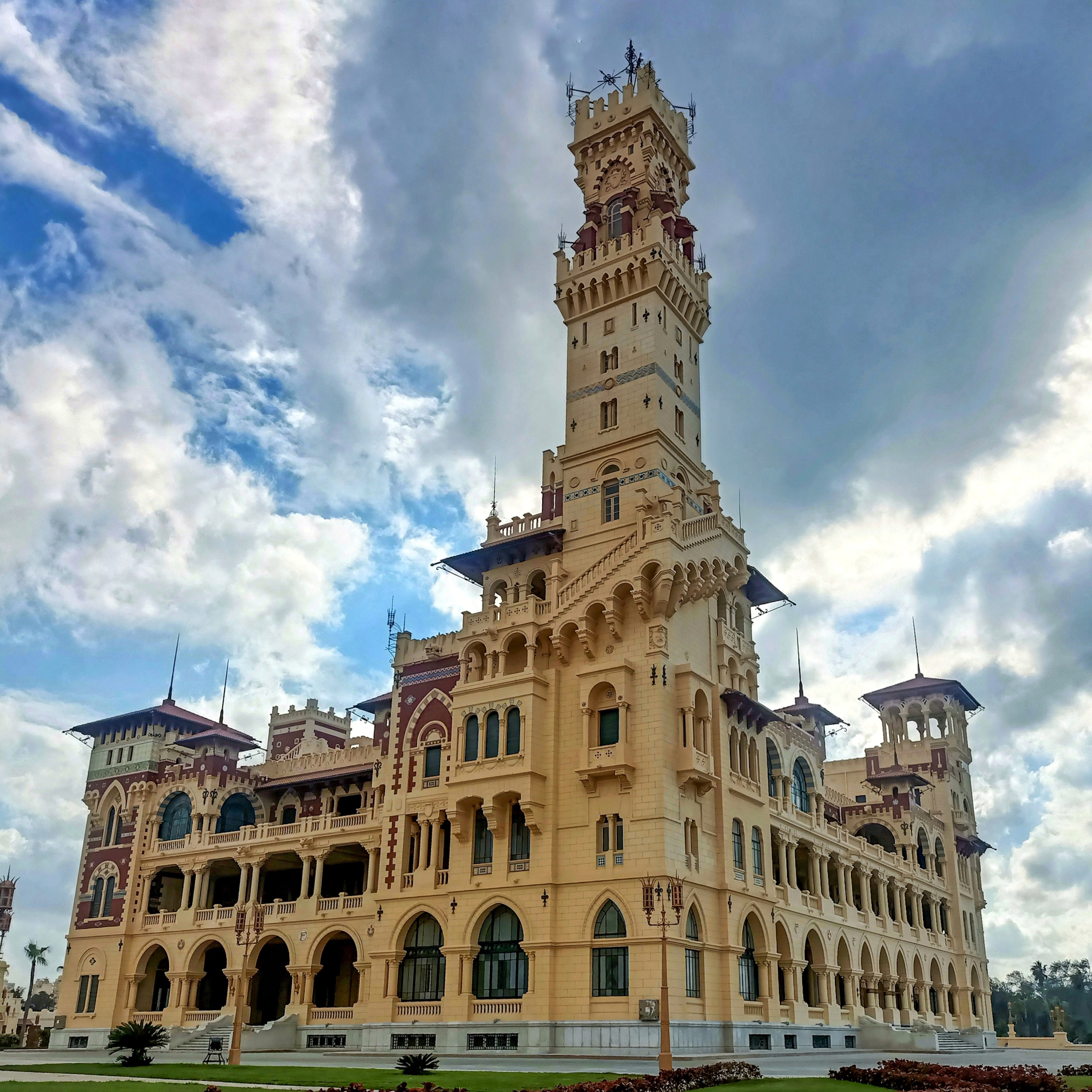
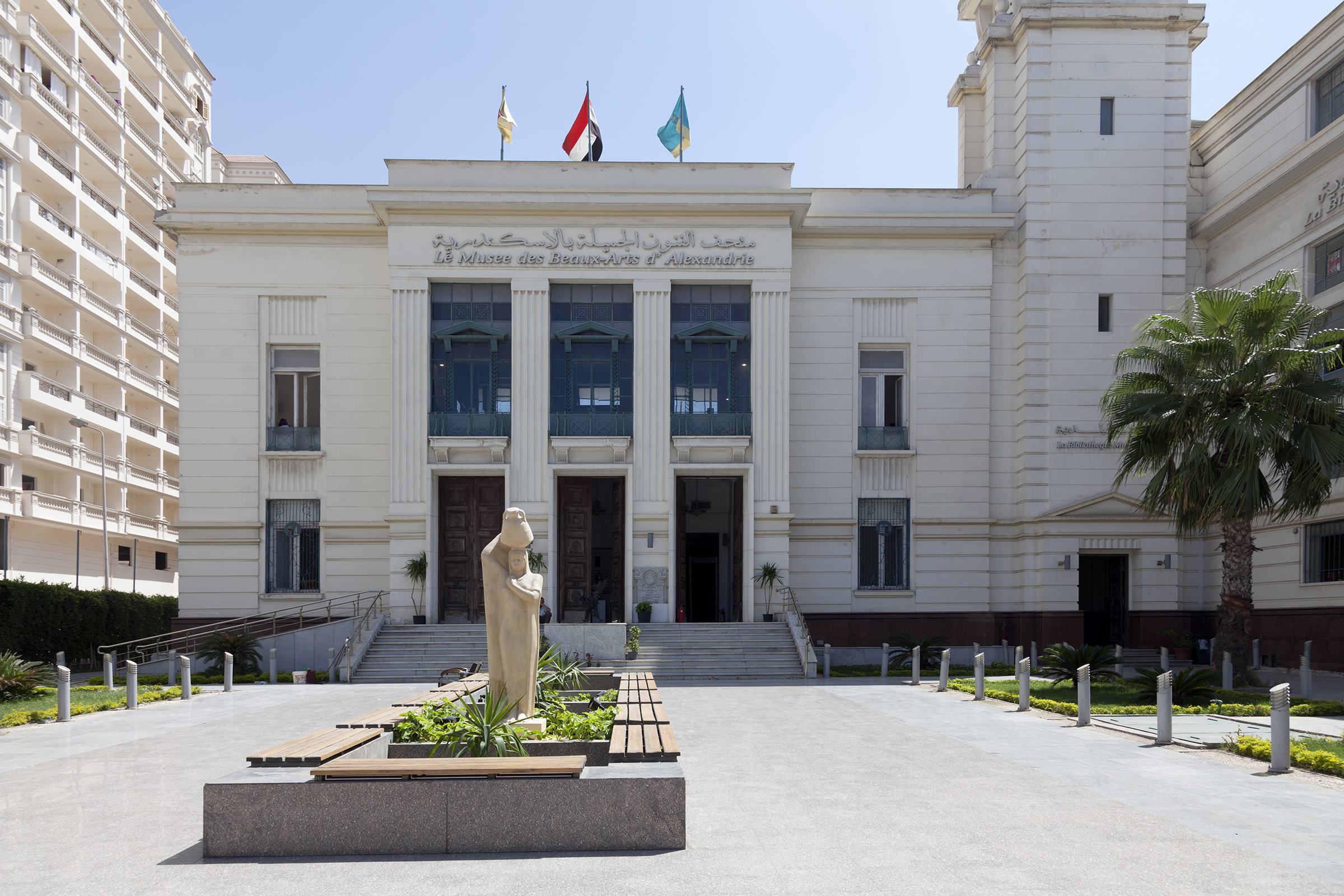
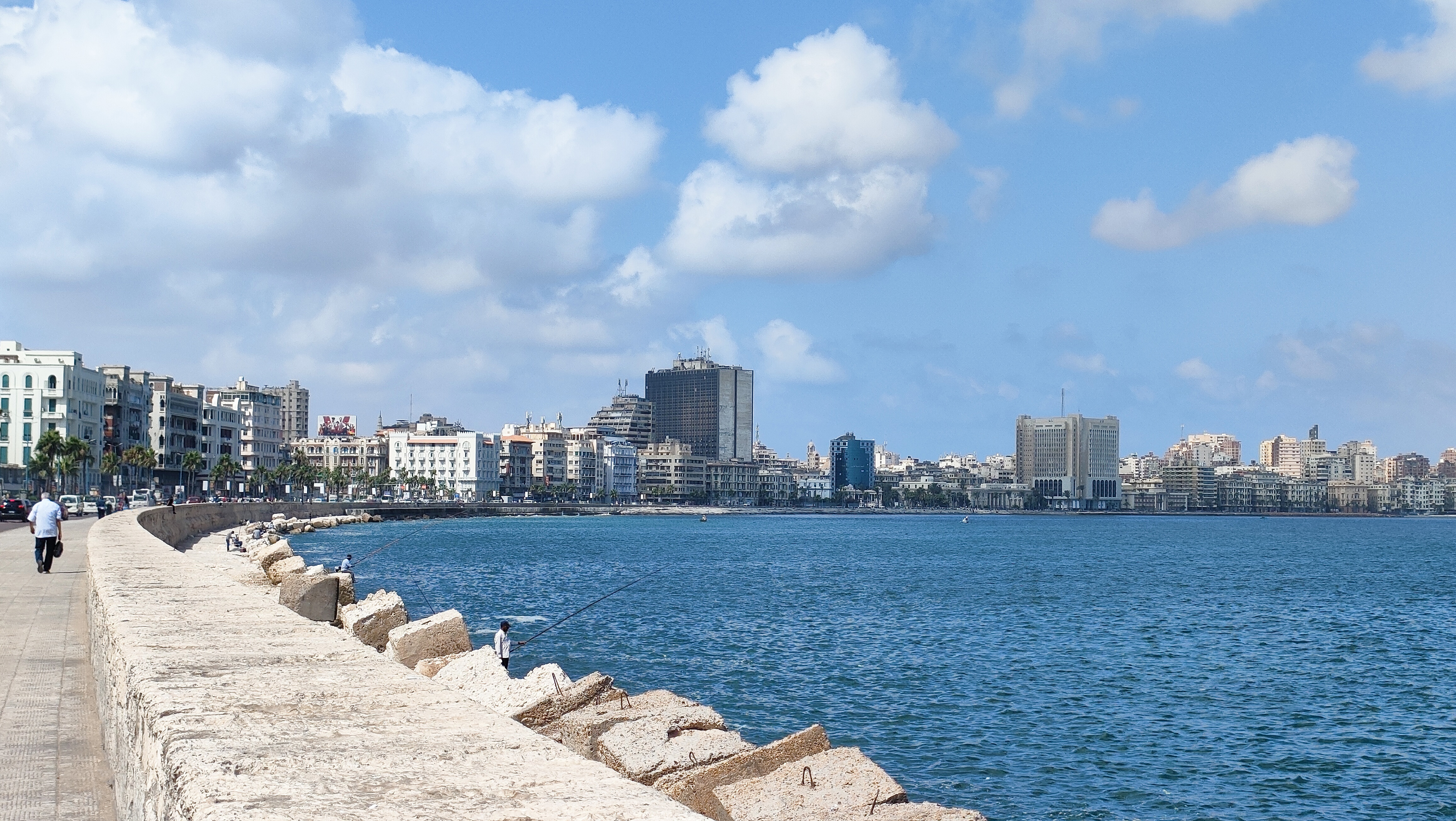
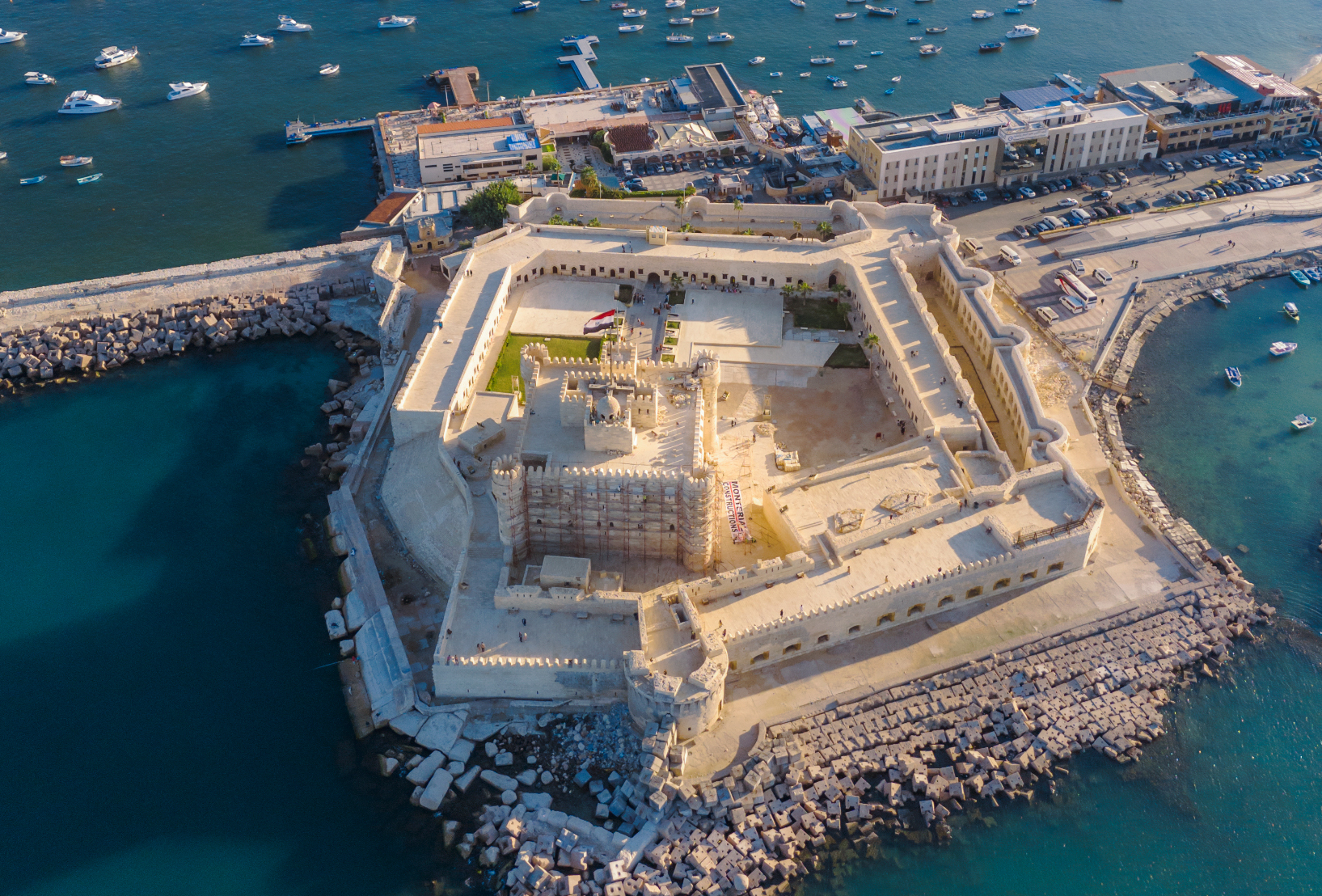
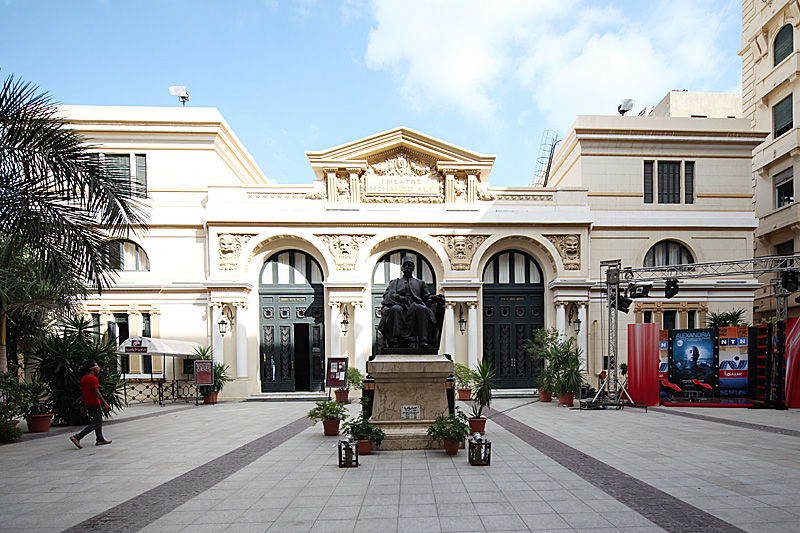
- The Alexandria Skyline as seen from the Mediterranean Bibliotheca Alexandrina Montaza Palace Museum of Fine Arts Stanley Bridge Alexandria Corniche Citadel of Qaitbay Alexandria Opera House

- Flag Emblem
- Nicknames: Mediterranean's Bride, Pearl of the Mediterranean, Alex
- Location in Egypt Alexandria (Africa)
- Coordinates: 31°11′51″N 29°53′33″E
- Country: Egypt
- Governorate: Alexandria
- Founded: 331 BC
- Founded by: Alexander the Great

Government
  - Governor: Ayman Mohammed Ibrahim Ahmed Ateyya

Area
  - Urban: 1,108 km^{2} (428 sq mi)
  - Metro: 1,661 km^{2} (641 sq mi)
- Elevation: −1 m (−3.3 ft)

Population (2024)
  - Rank: 2nd
  - Urban: 5,362,517
  - Urban density: 4,840/km^{2} (12,540/sq mi)
  - Metro: 5,700,000
  - Metro density: 3,400/km^{2} (8,900/sq mi)
- Demonyms: Alexandrian, Alexandrine, Iskandarani (Male, Arabic: إسكندراني), Iskandaraniah (Female, Arabic: إسكندرانية)

GDP (nominal, constant 2015 values)
  - Year: 2024
  - Total (Metro): $26.7 billion
  - Per capita: $4,684
- Time zone: UTC+2 (EET)
  - Summer (DST): UTC+3 (EEST)
- Postal code: 21xxx
- Area code: (+20) 3
- Website: alexandria.gov.eg

Alexandria (Note: /ˌælɪɡˈzændriə, -ˈzɑːn-/ AL-ig-ZA(H)N-dree-ə; Arabic: الإسكندرية, Standard romanisation: al-'Iskandariyya, pronounced [al.ʔiskanˈdarijja]; Egyptian Arabic romanisation: Eskenderiyya, pronounced [eskendeˈɾejjæ]) is a major city in Egypt. Lying at the western edge of the Nile River Delta, it extends about 40 km (25 mi) along the country's northern coast. It is Egypt's principal seaport, the second largest city after Cairo, and the largest city on the Mediterranean coast. Founded in 331 BC by Alexander the Great, Alexandria was one of the largest and most important cities of antiquity and a leading hub for science, culture, and scholarship.

Nicknamed the "Bride of the Mediterranean" and "Pearl of the Mediterranean Coast", the city is a popular tourist destination and a major industrial centre. It is the sixth-largest city in the Arab world, seventh-largest city in the Middle East, and the eleventh-largest city in Africa. The capital of the Alexandria Governorate, Alexandria is considered an industrial hub and is home to the Alexandria Shipyard. The city also has a large financial sector, and its ancient port Alexandria is one of the busiest ports in the country. Alexandria is the host city of the annual Alexandria Mediterranean Film Festival, held at the Bibliotheca Alexandrina. The city is also the home of the Alexandria Opera House, the Alexandria Museum of Fine Arts and the Alexandria National Museum. The city hosts many sporting events, and is the home of the association football club Al Ittihad. Alexandria extends beyond its administrative municipal city limits as well as its urban agglomeration, with a population of 5,700,000 in 2024 over an area of 1,661 square kilometres (641 sq mi).

Alexandria was originally established near an ancient Egyptian settlement named Rhacotis, which later became its Egyptian quarter. The city was made the capital of the Ptolemaic Kingdom and became the foremost commercial, intellectual, and cultural centre for much of the Hellenistic age and late antiquity; at one time, it was the most populous city in the ancient world. Alexandria was best known for the Lighthouse of Alexandria (Pharos), one of the Seven Wonders of the Ancient World; its Great Library, the largest in the ancient world; and the Catacombs of Kom El Shoqafa, one of the Seven Wonders of the Middle Ages.

Alexandria retained its status as one of the leading cities of the Mediterranean world for almost a millennium, serving as the Egyptian capital until a new capital was founded at Fustat, now part of Cairo. The city was a major hub of early Christianity and hosted the Patriarchate of Alexandria, one of the leading Christian centers in the Eastern Roman Empire; the modern Coptic Orthodox Church and the Greek Orthodox Church of Alexandria both lay claim to this ancient heritage.

By the mid-seventh century, the city continued to serve as a trading hub and naval base. From the late 18th century, it was a major centre of the international shipping industry and one of the most important trading centers in the world, owing to the easy overland connection between the Mediterranean and Red Seas and the lucrative trade in Egyptian cotton. Alexandria's rebirth began in the early 19th century under Muhammad Ali, considered the founder of modern Egypt, who implemented infrastructure projects and modernisation efforts.

== Name ==
r Z1 a A35 t niwt
r-ꜥ-qd(y)t (Alexandria)
in hieroglyphs
Era: Ptolemaic dynasty
(305–30 BC)

Alexandria was located on the earlier Egyptian settlement, which was called Rhacotis (Ancient Greek: Ῥακῶτις, romanized: Rhakôtis), the Hellenised form of Egyptian r-ꜥ-qd(y)t (Bohairic Coptic: ⲣⲁⲕⲟϯ, romanized: Rakoti). As one of many settlements founded by Alexander the Great, the city he founded on Rhacotis was called Alexándreia hḗ kat' Aígypton (Ἀλεξάνδρεια ἡ κατ' Αἴγυπτον), which some sources translated as "Alexandria by Egypt", as the city was, at that time, in the periphery of Egypt proper (the area beside the Nile). Some of the Alexandrian and Greek populaces, e.g., Hypsicles, also referred to the city as Alexándreia hḗ prós Aígypton (Ἀλεξάνδρεια ἡ πρός Αἴγυπτον, "Alexandria near Egypt"). In the course of Roman rule in Egypt, the city's name was Latinised as Alexandrēa ad Aegyptum. In Coptic, the city continued to be referred to by its earlier name (Rakoti), with only a few exceptions.

After the capture of Alexandria by the Rashiduns in AD 641, the name was Arabicised: initial Al- was re-analysed into the definite article; metathesis occurred on x, from [ks] to [sk]; and the suffix -eia was assimilated into the feminine adjectival suffix -iyya (ـِيَّة), finally rendering the name al-ʔiskandariyya (الْإِسْكَنْدَرِيَّة).

== History ==
=== Ancient era ===
Radiocarbon dating of seashell fragments and lead contamination show human activity at the location during the period of the Old Kingdom (27th–21st centuries BC) and again in the period 1000–800 BC, followed by the absence of activity after that. From ancient sources it is known there existed a trading post at this location during the time of Rameses the Great for trade with Crete, but it had long been lost by the time of Alexander's arrival. A small Egyptian fishing village named Rhakotis (Egyptian: rꜥ-qdy.t, 'That which is built up') existed since the 13th century BC in the vicinity and eventually grew into the Egyptian quarter of the city. Just east of Alexandria (where Abu Qir Bay is now), there were in ancient times marshland and several islands. As early as the 7th century BC, there existed important port cities of Canopus and Heracleion. The latter was recently rediscovered underwater.

Alexandria was founded by Alexander the Great in April 331 BC as Ἀλεξάνδρεια (Alexandreia), as one of his many city foundations. After he captured the Egyptian Satrapy from the Persians, Alexander wanted to build a large Greek city on Egypt's coast that would bear his name. He chose the site of Alexandria, envisioning the building of a causeway to the nearby island of Pharos that would generate two great natural harbours. Alexandria was intended to supersede the older Greek colony of Naucratis as a Hellenistic center in Egypt and to be the link between Greece and the rich Nile valley. A few months after the foundation, Alexander left Egypt and never returned to the city during his life.

Plan of Alexandria (c. 30 BC)

After Alexander's departure, his viceroy Cleomenes continued the expansion. The architect Dinocrates of Rhodes designed the city, using a Hippodamian grid plan. Following Alexander's death in 323 BC, his general Ptolemy Lagides took possession of Egypt and brought Alexander's body to Egypt with him. Ptolemy at first ruled from the old Egyptian capital of Memphis. In 322/321 BC he had Cleomenes executed. Finally, in 305 BC, Ptolemy declared himself Pharaoh as Ptolemy I Soter ("Savior") and moved his capital to Alexandria.

Although Cleomenes was mainly in charge of overseeing Alexandria's early development, the Heptastadion and the mainland quarters seem to have been primarily Ptolemaic work. Inheriting the trade of ruined Tyre and becoming the centre of the new commerce between Europe and the Arabian and Indian East, the city grew in less than a generation to be larger than Carthage. In one century, Alexandria had become the largest city in the world and, for some centuries more, was second only to Rome. It became Egypt's main Greek city, with Greek people from diverse backgrounds.

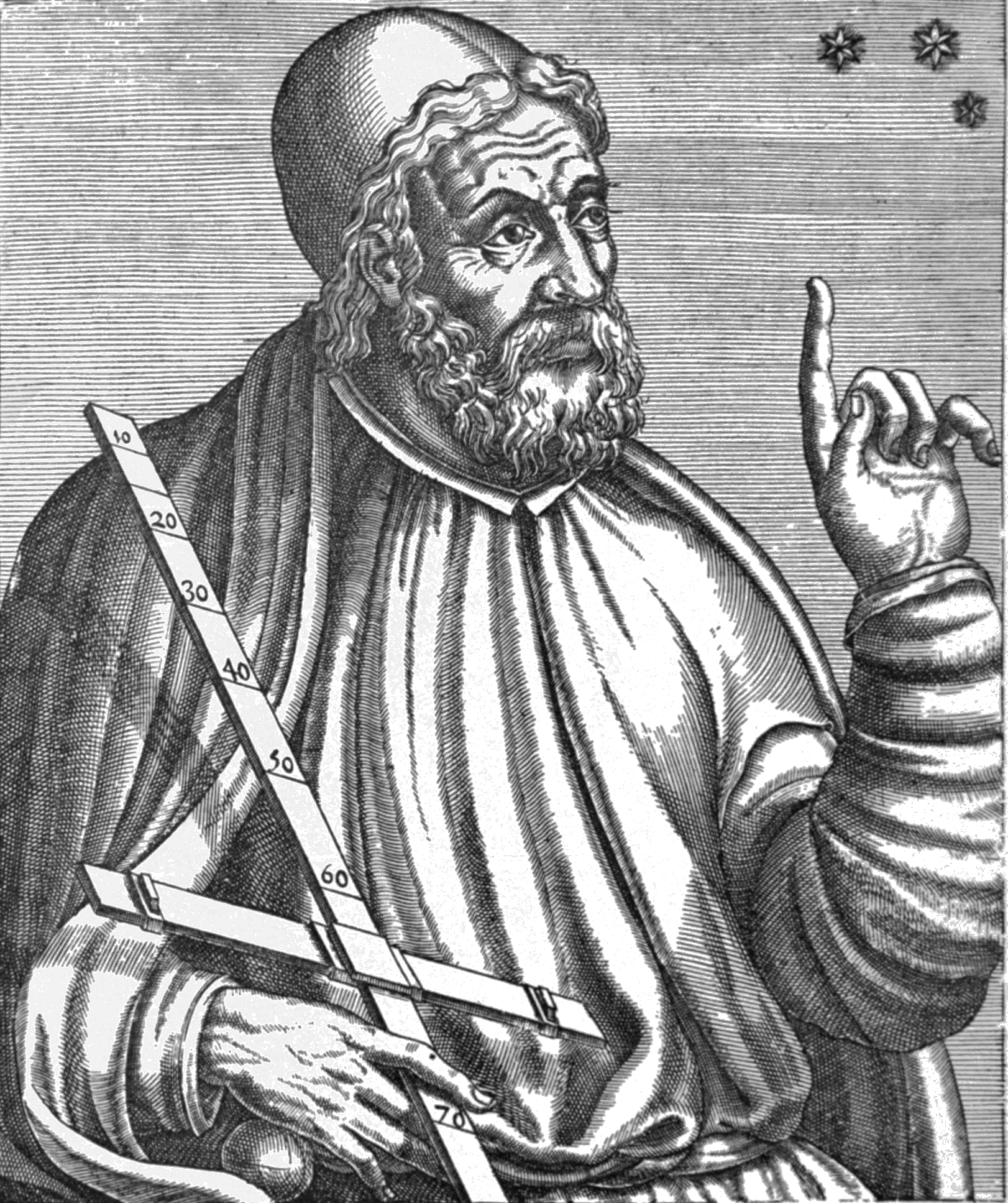
The Greco-Roman mathematician and astronomer Ptolemy lived and worked in Alexandria, then a predominantly Greek city.

The Septuagint, a Greek version of the Tanakh, was produced there. The early Ptolemies kept the city in order and fostered the development of its museum into the leading Hellenistic centre of learning (Library of Alexandria, which faced destruction during Caesar's siege of Alexandria in 47 BC), but were careful to maintain the distinction of its population's three largest ethnicities: Greek, Egyptian and Jewish. By the time of Augustus, the city grid encompassed an area of 10 km^{2} (3.9 sq mi), and the total population during the Roman principate was around 500,000–600,000, which would wax and wane in the course of the next four centuries under Roman rule.

According to Philo of Alexandria, in the year 38 AD, disturbances erupted between Jews and Greek citizens of Alexandria during a visit paid by King Agrippa I to Alexandria, principally over the respect paid by the Herodian nation to the Roman emperor, which quickly escalated to open affronts and violence between the two ethnic groups and the desecration of Alexandrian synagogues. This event has been called the Alexandrian pogroms. The violence was quelled after Caligula intervened and had the Roman governor, Flaccus, removed from the city.

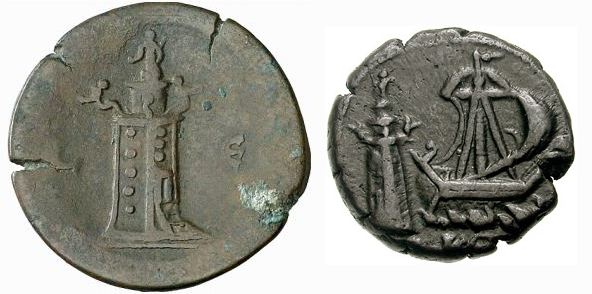
The Lighthouse of Alexandria on coins minted in Alexandria in the second century (1: reverse of a coin of Antoninus Pius, and 2: reverse of a coin of Commodus)

In 115 AD, large parts of Alexandria were destroyed during the Diaspora revolt, which gave Hadrian and his architect, Decriannus, an opportunity to rebuild it. In 215 AD, the emperor Caracalla visited the city and, because of some insulting satires that the inhabitants had directed at him, abruptly commanded his troops to put to death all youths capable of bearing arms. On 21 July 365 AD, Alexandria was devastated by a tsunami (365 Crete earthquake), an event annually commemorated years later as a "day of horror".

Alexandria was an important city in the early history of Christianity, and played a key role in the development of Christian theology.

=== Islamic era ===
In 619, Alexandria fell to the Sassanid Persians. The city was mostly uninjured by the conquest and a new palace called Tarawus was erected in the eastern part of the city, later known as Qasr Faris, "fort of the Persians". Although the Byzantine emperor Heraclius recovered it in 629, in 641 the Arabs under the general 'Amr ibn al-'As invaded it during the Muslim conquest of Egypt, after a siege that lasted 14 months. The first Arab governor of Egypt recorded to have visited Alexandria was Utba ibn Abi Sufyan, who strengthened the Arab presence and built a governor's palace in the city in 664–665.

In reference to Alexandria, Ibn Battuta speaks of a number of Muslim saints that resided in the city. One such saint was Imam Borhan Oddin El Aaraj, who was said to perform miracles. Another notable figure was Yaqut al-'Arshi, a disciple of Abu Abbas El Mursi. Ibn Battuta also writes about Abu 'Abdallah al-Murshidi, a saint that lived in the Minyat of Ibn Murshed. Although al-Murshidi lived in seclusion, Ibn Battuta writes that he was regularly visited by crowds, high state officials, and even by the Sultan of Egypt at the time, al-Nasir Muhammad. Ibn Battuta also visited the Pharos lighthouse on two occasions: in 1326 he found it to be partly in ruins and in 1349 it had deteriorated to the point that it was no longer possible to enter.

Throughout the late medieval period, Alexandria re-emerged as a major metropolis and the most important commercial port in Egypt and one of the most important in the Mediterranean. The Jewish traveller Benjamin of Tudela even described it as "a trading market for all nations". Indeed, Alexandria was the outlet for all goods coming from Arabia, such as incense, and from India and South-East Asia, such as spices (pepper, cloves, cinnamon, etc.), precious stones, pearls and exotic woods like brazilwood. But it was also the outlet for goods from Africa, such as ivory and precious woods. These goods arrived in Alexandria after passing through Aden on their way to the Red Sea, then headed up the Red Sea to be unloaded in the port of Aydhab. From Aydhab, a caravan took the goods to the Nile, probably to the town of Qus. From there, the goods sailed to Alexandria. These goods then found their way to the Alexandria market alongside Egyptian products.

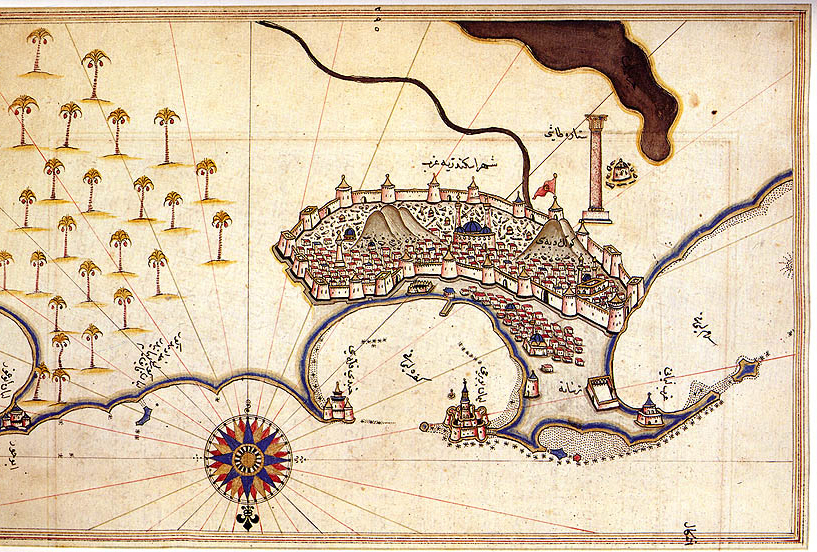
A 16th-century map of Alexandria from the Kitab-ı Bahriye (Book of Navigation) by Ottoman cartographer Piri Reis

This route was the cheapest and fastest in comparison with the land routes that reached the Mediterranean from Syria or Constantinople. Latin merchants (Venetians, Genoese, Pisans, Catalans, Provençals, etc.) thus entered this market. As early as the 12th century, the major trading cities had funduqs and consuls in Alexandria. A funduq, in this context is an area, often fortified, within the city dedicated to the community of a trading nation under the authority of a consul. The consul was responsible for adjudicating disputes between merchants of his nation, and also when a subject of the sultan lodged a complaint against a merchant of their nation.The terms of this installation were often set out in treaties between the sultans and the consuls. These treaties were part of a policy pursued by the early Mamluk sultans, who encouraged the arrival of merchants from Europe in Alexandria, since this trade not only brought the sultan considerable revenue, but also enabled him to obtain supplies of wood and iron from Europe. Later, in the 14th century, the Latin trade in Alexandria was also important for the sultans, as it enabled them to obtain supplies of mameluks (slave-soldiers) often sold by Genoese merchants.

As this trade was very important to the sultans, they were keen to control the city's institutions. Indeed, in Alexandria, in addition to an Emir (governor), the sultan sent a customs inspector who answered directly to the nazir al-khas (person in charge of managing the sultan's patrimony). Customs was not only responsible for collecting customs duties, but also for the security of the port and its warehouses. Alexandria customs also played a role in commercial arbitration and was the preferred circuit for the sale of products brought in by the merchants, which took place at auction. These sales were set up to encourage the merchants to sell their products to or through the sultan, rather than selling them freely on the city's markets. Latin merchants also had jurisdictional privileges : in addition to being judged by their consul if a subject of the sultan lodged a complaint against them, Latin merchants could not be judged by the qadis (civil judges) but had to be judged by the mazalim (the sultan's courts).

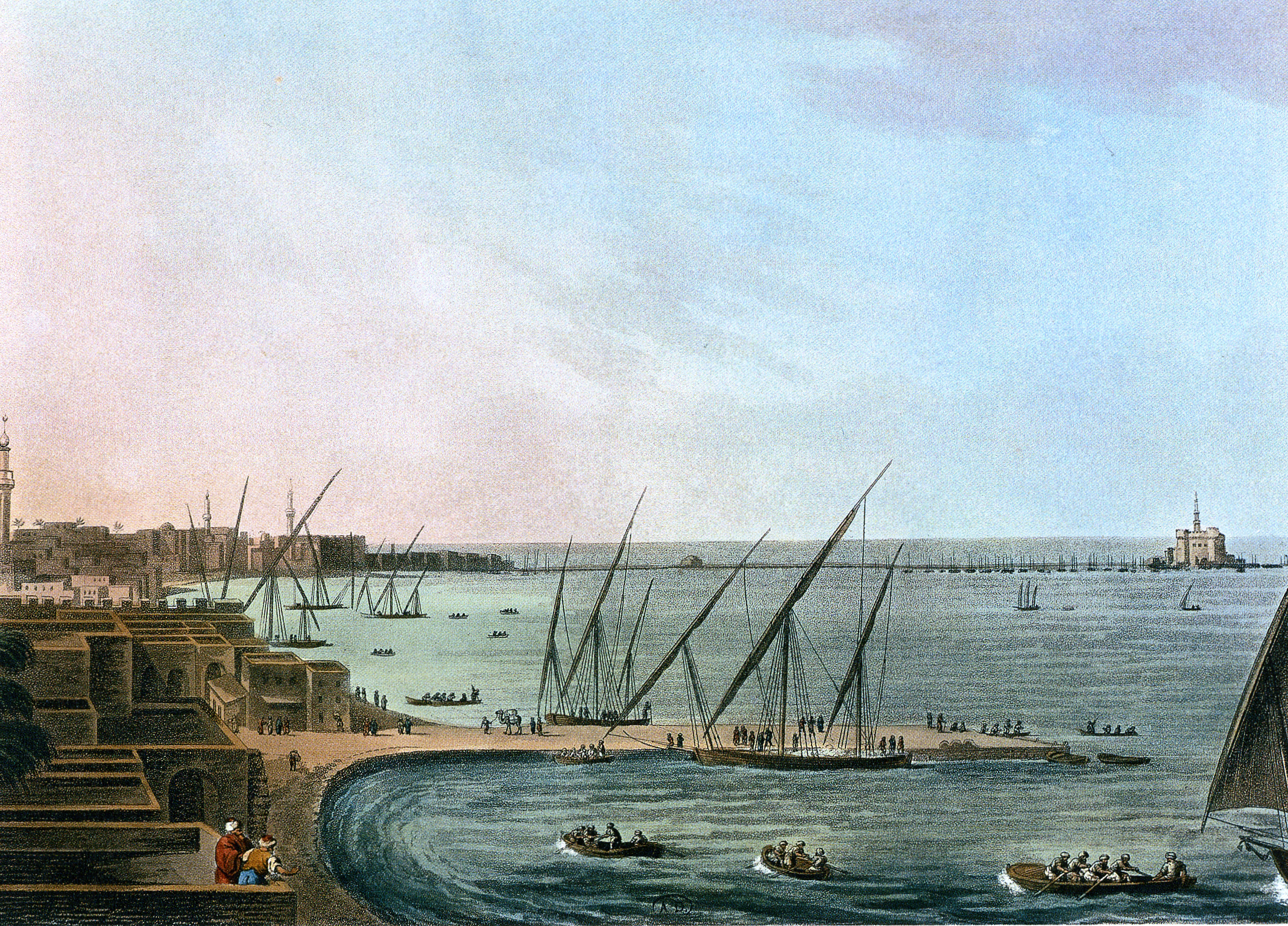
Alexandria in the late 18th century, by Luigi Mayer

Alexandria lost much of its importance in international trade after Portuguese navigators discovered a new sea route to India in the late 15th century. This reduced the amount of goods that needed to be transported through the Alexandrian port, as well as the Mamluks' political power. After the Battle of Ridaniya in 1517, the city was conquered by the Ottoman Turks and remained under Ottoman rule until 1798. Alexandria lost much of its former importance to the Egyptian port city of Rosetta during the 9th to 18th centuries, and it only regained its former prominence with the construction of the Mahmoudiyah Canal in 1820.

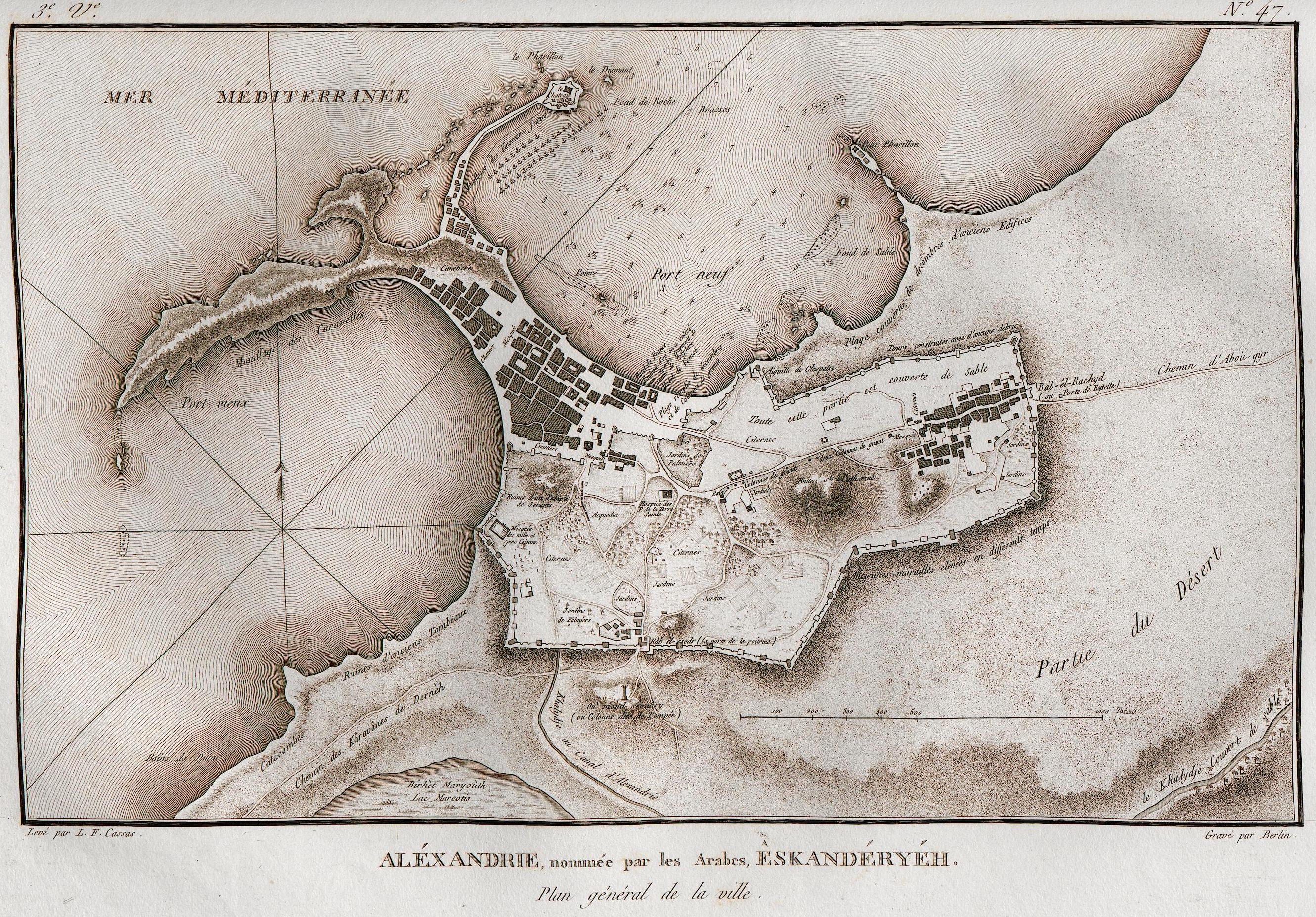
Map of the city in the 1780s, by Louis-François Cassas

Alexandria figured prominently in the military operations of Napoleon's expedition to Egypt in 1798. French troops stormed the city on 2 July 1798, and it remained in their hands until the arrival of a British expedition in 1801. The British won a considerable victory over the French at the Battle of Alexandria on 21 March 1801, following which they besieged the city, which fell to them on 2 September 1801. Muhammad Ali, the Ottoman governor of Egypt, began rebuilding and redevelopment around 1810 and, by 1850, Alexandria had returned to something akin to its former glory. Egypt turned to Europe in their effort to modernise the country. Greeks, followed by other Europeans and others, began moving to the city. In the early 20th century, the city became a home for novelists and poets.

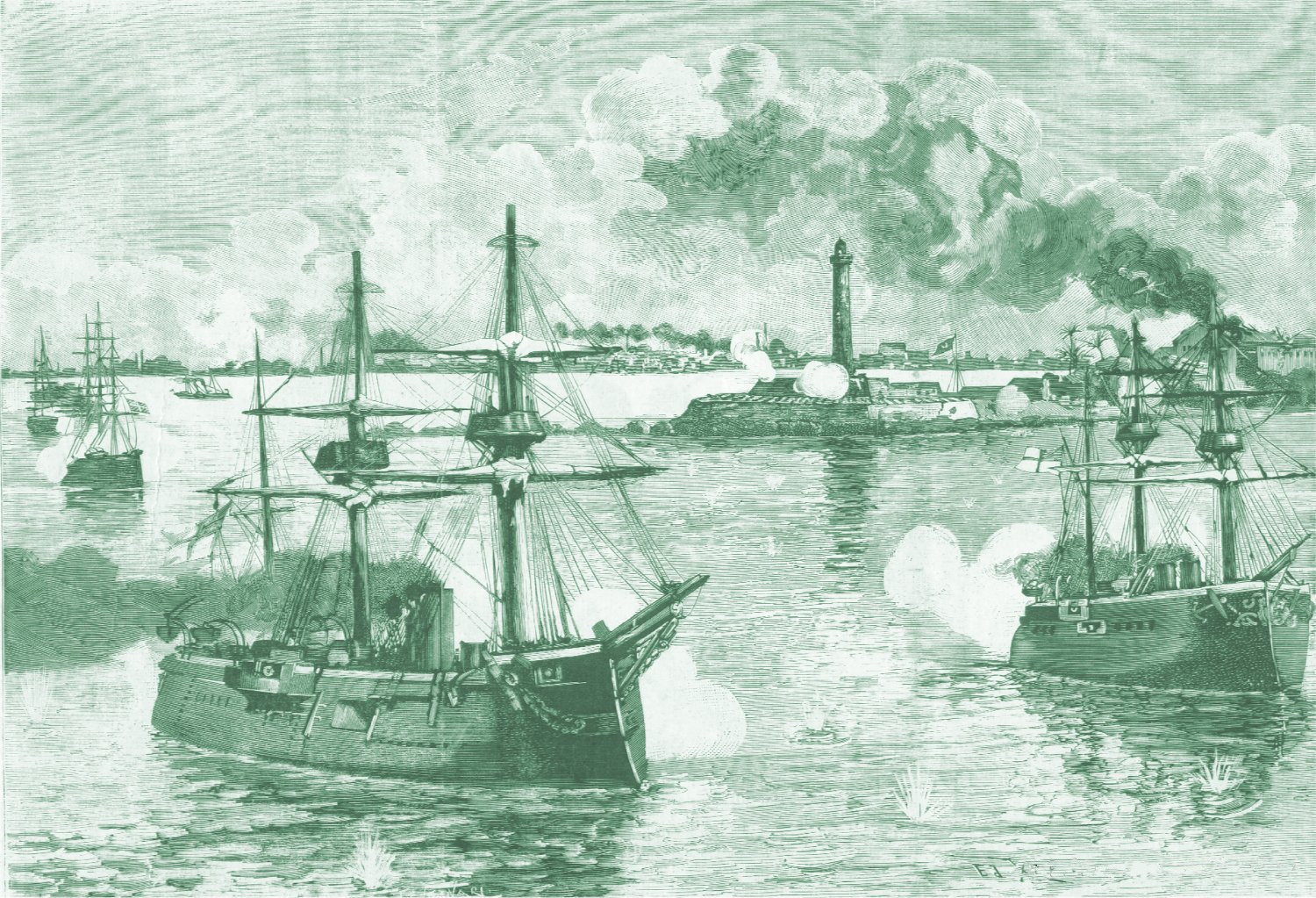
Bombardment of Alexandria by British naval forces (1882)

In July 1882, the city came under bombardment from British naval forces and was occupied.

In July 1954, the city was a target of an Israeli bombing campaign that later became known as the Lavon Affair. On 26 October 1954, Alexandria's Mansheya Square was the site of a failed assassination attempt on Gamal Abdel Nasser.

Europeans began leaving Alexandria following the 1956 Suez Crisis that led to an outburst of Arab nationalism. The nationalisation of property by Nasser, which reached its highest point in 1961, drove out nearly all the rest.

== Geography ==
Alexandria is located in the country of Egypt, on the southern coast of the Mediterranean. It is in the Far West Nile delta area. The very large Lake Mariout was located directly south of Alexandria in ancient times.

Ancient Alexandria thus also possessed a long lake waterfront on its southern side. The ancient geographer Strabo praised this feature of Alexandria's geography because it opened Alexandria to the Nile delta and Egypt. A port city named Portus Mareoticus was located there. Due to the desiccation of Maryut Lake, this waterfront shifted away from the city in the 9th century CE. So Alexandria canal was then constructed to link the city to the Nile.

Alexandria is a densely populated city; its core areas belie its large administrative area. The city's geology consists of soil sediments, oolitic sand and clay, oolitic limestone (from the Middle Miocene), grey shelly dolomite, marly dolomite, oncolitic limestone and dolomite, and as well as shelly limestone.

| Region | (Population) | | Area km^{2} | Density per km^{2} (2020) |
| Region | 1996 | 2020 proj* | Area km^{2} | Density per km^{2} (2020) |
|---|---|---|---|---|
| Alexandria, 14 kisms (contiguous) | 2,199,000 | 4,439,000 | 203.57 | 21,805 |

Notes: 2020 CAPMAS projection based on 2017 revised census figures, may differ significantly from 2017 census preliminary tabulations. The 14 kisms were reported simply as Alexandria city by CAPMAS in 2006 but given explosive growth definitions, likely informal, may have changed or may be set to change. Same area with 12 kisms existed in 1996. Kisms are considered 'fully urbanised'

=== Climate ===
Alexandria has a borderline hot steppe and hot desert climate (Köppen climate classification: BSh/BWh). Like the rest of Egypt's northern coast, the prevailing north wind, blowing across the Mediterranean, gives the city a less severe climate than the desert hinterland. Rafah and Alexandria are the wettest places in Egypt; the other wettest places are Rosetta, Baltim, Kafr el-Dawwar, and Mersa Matruh. The city's climate is influenced by the Mediterranean Sea, moderating its temperatures, causing variable rainy winters and moderately hot and slightly prolonged summers that, at times, can be very humid; January and February are the coolest months, with daily maximum temperatures typically ranging from 12 to 18 °C (54 to 64 °F) and minimum temperatures that could reach 5 °C (41 °F).

Alexandria experiences violent storms, rain and sometimes sleet and hail during the cooler months; these events, combined with a poor drainage system, have been responsible for occasional flooding in the city in the past, though they rarely occur anymore. July and August are the hottest and driest months of the year, with an average daily maximum temperature of 30 °C (86 °F). The average annual rainfall is around 211 mm (8.3 in) but has been as high as 417 mm (16.4 in)

Port Said, Kosseir, Baltim, Damietta and Alexandria have the least temperature variation in Egypt.

The highest recorded temperature was 45 °C (113 °F) on 30 May 1961, and the coldest recorded temperature was 0 °C (32 °F) on 31 January 1994.

Climate data for Alexandria (El Nouzha Airport), 1991–2020 normals, extremes 1957–present
| Month | Jan | Feb | Mar | Apr | May | Jun | Jul | Aug | Sep | Oct | Nov | Dec | Year |
|---|---|---|---|---|---|---|---|---|---|---|---|---|---|
| Record high °C (°F) | 29.6 (85.3) | 33.0 (91.4) | 40.0 (104.0) | 40.8 (105.4) | 45.0 (113.0) | 43.9 (111.0) | 40.7 (105.3) | 39.8 (103.6) | 39.0 (102.2) | 38.3 (100.9) | 35.7 (96.3) | 31.0 (87.8) | 45.0 (113.0) |
| Mean maximum °C (°F) | 23.4 (74.1) | 25.1 (77.2) | 29.8 (85.6) | 34.6 (94.3) | 36.9 (98.4) | 35.1 (95.2) | 33.8 (92.8) | 33.7 (92.7) | 33.6 (92.5) | 32.4 (90.3) | 28.7 (83.7) | 24.8 (76.6) | 38.2 (100.8) |
| Mean daily maximum °C (°F) | 18.4 (65.1) | 19.0 (66.2) | 21.1 (70.0) | 24.1 (75.4) | 26.9 (80.4) | 29.1 (84.4) | 30.5 (86.9) | 31.0 (87.8) | 30.2 (86.4) | 27.8 (82.0) | 24.0 (75.2) | 20.1 (68.2) | 25.2 (77.4) |
| Daily mean °C (°F) | 14.0 (57.2) | 14.4 (57.9) | 16.4 (61.5) | 19.0 (66.2) | 22.2 (72.0) | 25.2 (77.4) | 27.1 (80.8) | 27.8 (82.0) | 26.4 (79.5) | 23.6 (74.5) | 19.6 (67.3) | 15.6 (60.1) | 20.9 (69.6) |
| Mean daily minimum °C (°F) | 9.5 (49.1) | 9.7 (49.5) | 11.8 (53.2) | 14.3 (57.7) | 17.8 (64.0) | 21.7 (71.1) | 23.9 (75.0) | 24.4 (75.9) | 22.5 (72.5) | 19.3 (66.7) | 15.1 (59.2) | 11.1 (52.0) | 16.8 (62.2) |
| Mean minimum °C (°F) | 6.1 (43.0) | 6.4 (43.5) | 7.6 (45.7) | 10.2 (50.4) | 13.8 (56.8) | 17.6 (63.7) | 20.3 (68.5) | 20.9 (69.6) | 19.1 (66.4) | 15.6 (60.1) | 11.4 (52.5) | 7.8 (46.0) | 5.3 (41.5) |
| Record low °C (°F) | 0.0 (32.0) | 1.2 (34.2) | 2.3 (36.1) | 3.6 (38.5) | 8.5 (47.3) | 11.6 (52.9) | 17.0 (62.6) | 17.8 (64.0) | 14.0 (57.2) | 10.7 (51.3) | 4.6 (40.3) | 1.2 (34.2) | 0.0 (32.0) |
| Average precipitation mm (inches) | 61.4 (2.42) | 35.2 (1.39) | 12.8 (0.50) | 2.6 (0.10) | 1.0 (0.04) | 0.0 (0.0) | 0.0 (0.0) | 0.0 (0.0) | 0.8 (0.03) | 8.3 (0.33) | 36.8 (1.45) | 52.7 (2.07) | 211.6 (8.33) |
| Average precipitation days (≥ 1.0 mm) | 8.2 | 5.4 | 2.8 | 1.2 | 1.4 | 0.5 | 0.4 | 0.4 | 0.2 | 1.2 | 3.5 | 5.9 | 31.1 |
| Average relative humidity (%) | 69 | 67 | 67 | 65 | 66 | 68 | 71 | 71 | 67 | 68 | 68 | 68 | 67.9 |
| Average dew point °C (°F) | 7.8 (46.0) | 7.8 (46.0) | 9.1 (48.4) | 11.3 (52.3) | 14.4 (57.9) | 17.9 (64.2) | 20.1 (68.2) | 20.4 (68.7) | 18.6 (65.5) | 15.9 (60.6) | 12.6 (54.7) | 9.0 (48.2) | 13.7 (56.7) |
| Mean monthly sunshine hours | 192.0 | 210.3 | 247.0 | 273.9 | 316.8 | 353.2 | 362.2 | 345.3 | 296.7 | 281.7 | 224.1 | 195.7 | 3,298.9 |
| Percentage possible sunshine | 62 | 67 | 70 | 76 | 81 | 89 | 91 | 90 | 86 | 78 | 69 | 61 | 77 |
| Average ultraviolet index | 3 | 5 | 7 | 9 | 10 | 11 | 12 | 11 | 9 | 6 | 4 | 3 | 8 |
Source 1: NOAA (humidity, dew point, sun 1961–1990)
Source 2: Meteo Climat (records) and Weather Atlas (uv index)

Alexandria mean sea temperature
| Jan | Feb | Mar | Apr | May | Jun | Jul | Aug | Sep | Oct | Nov | Dec |
|---|---|---|---|---|---|---|---|---|---|---|---|
| 18 °C (64 °F) | 17 °C (63 °F) | 17 °C (63 °F) | 18 °C (64 °F) | 20 °C (68 °F) | 23 °C (73 °F) | 25 °C (77 °F) | 26 °C (79 °F) | 26 °C (79 °F) | 25 °C (77 °F) | 22 °C (72 °F) | 20 °C (68 °F) |

==== Climate change ====
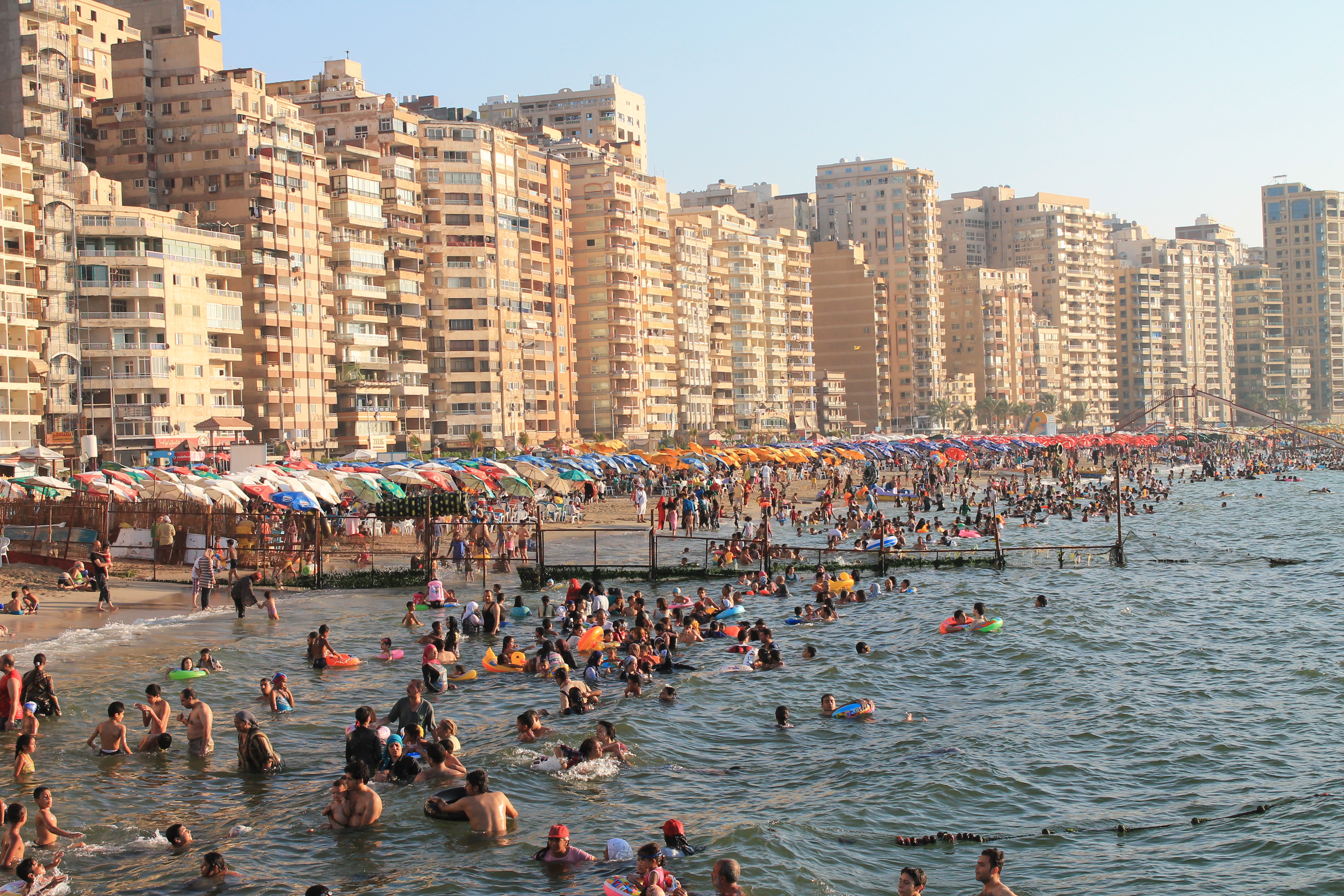
The densely populated coastline of Alexandria, identified as one of the world's most vulnerable cities to sea level rise.

A 2019 paper published in PLOS One estimated that under Representative Concentration Pathway 4.5, a "moderate" scenario of climate change where global warming reaches ~2.5–3 °C (4.5–5.4 °F) by 2100, the climate of Alexandria in the year 2050 would most closely resemble the current climate of Gaza City. The annual temperature would increase by 2.8 °C (5.0 °F), and the temperature of the warmest and the coldest month by 2.9 °C (5.2 °F) and 3.1 °C (5.6 °F). According to Climate Action Tracker, the current warming trajectory appears consistent with 2.7 °C (4.9 °F), which closely matches RCP 4.5.

Due to its location on a Nile river delta, Alexandria is one of the most vulnerable cities to sea level rise in the entire world. According to some estimates, hundreds of thousands of people in its low-lying areas may already have to be relocated before 2030. The 2022 IPCC Sixth Assessment Report estimates that by 2050, Alexandria and 11 other major African cities (Abidjan, Algiers, Cape Town, Casablanca, Dakar, Dar es Salaam, Durban, Lagos, Lomé, Luanda and Maputo) would collectively sustain cumulative damages of US$65 billion for the "moderate" climate change scenario RCP 4.5 and US$86.5 billion for the high-emission scenario RCP 8.5, while RCP 8.5 combined with the hypothetical impact from marine ice sheet instability at high levels of warming would involve up to US$137.5 billion in damages. Additional accounting for the "low-probability, high-damage events" may increase aggregate risks to US$187 billion for the "moderate" RCP4.5, US$206 billion for RCP8.5 and US$397 billion under the high-end ice sheet instability scenario. In every single estimate, Alexandria alone bears around half of these costs. Since sea level rise would continue for about 10,000 years under every scenario of climate change, future costs of sea level rise would only increase, especially without adaptation measures. Recent studies published in Earth's Future by the American Geophysical Union indicate that rising sea levels are causing increases in coastal aquifer levels, reaching building foundations and accelerating their corrosion and potential collapse. The study predicts that in 2025, more than 7000 buildings in Alexandria will be at risk of collapse due to these groundwater processes.

== Ancient layout ==
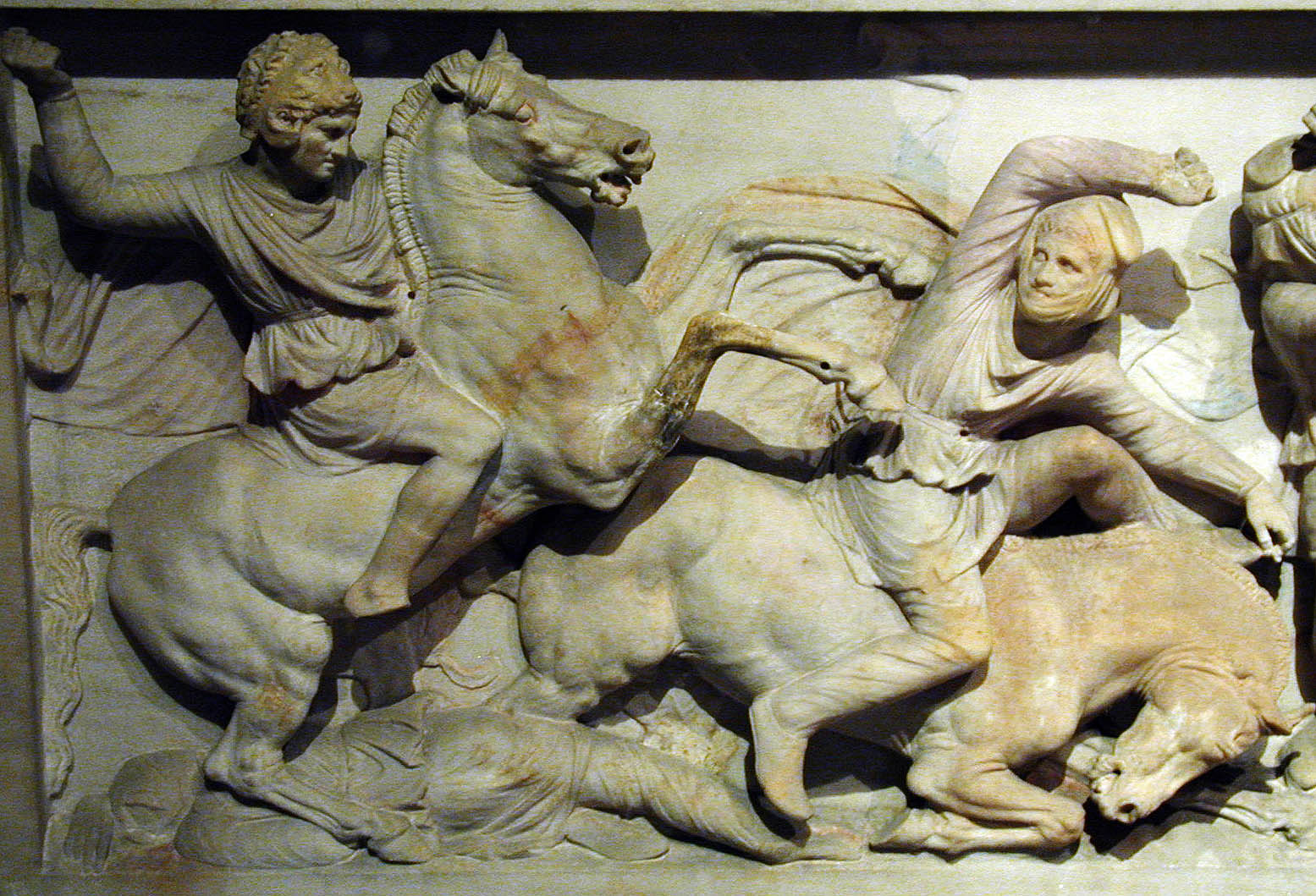
Macedonian Army, shown on the Alexander Sarcophagus

Greek Alexandria was divided into three regions:

Rhakotis
Rhakotis (from Coptic Rakotə, "Alexandria") was the old city that was absorbed into Alexandria. It was occupied chiefly by Egyptians.
Brucheum
Brucheum was the Royal or Greek quarter and formed the most magnificent portion of the city. In Roman times, Brucheum was enlarged by the addition of an official quarter, making four regions in all. The city was laid out as a grid of parallel streets, each of which had an attendant subterranean canal.
Jewish quarter
The Jewish quarter was the northeast portion of the city.

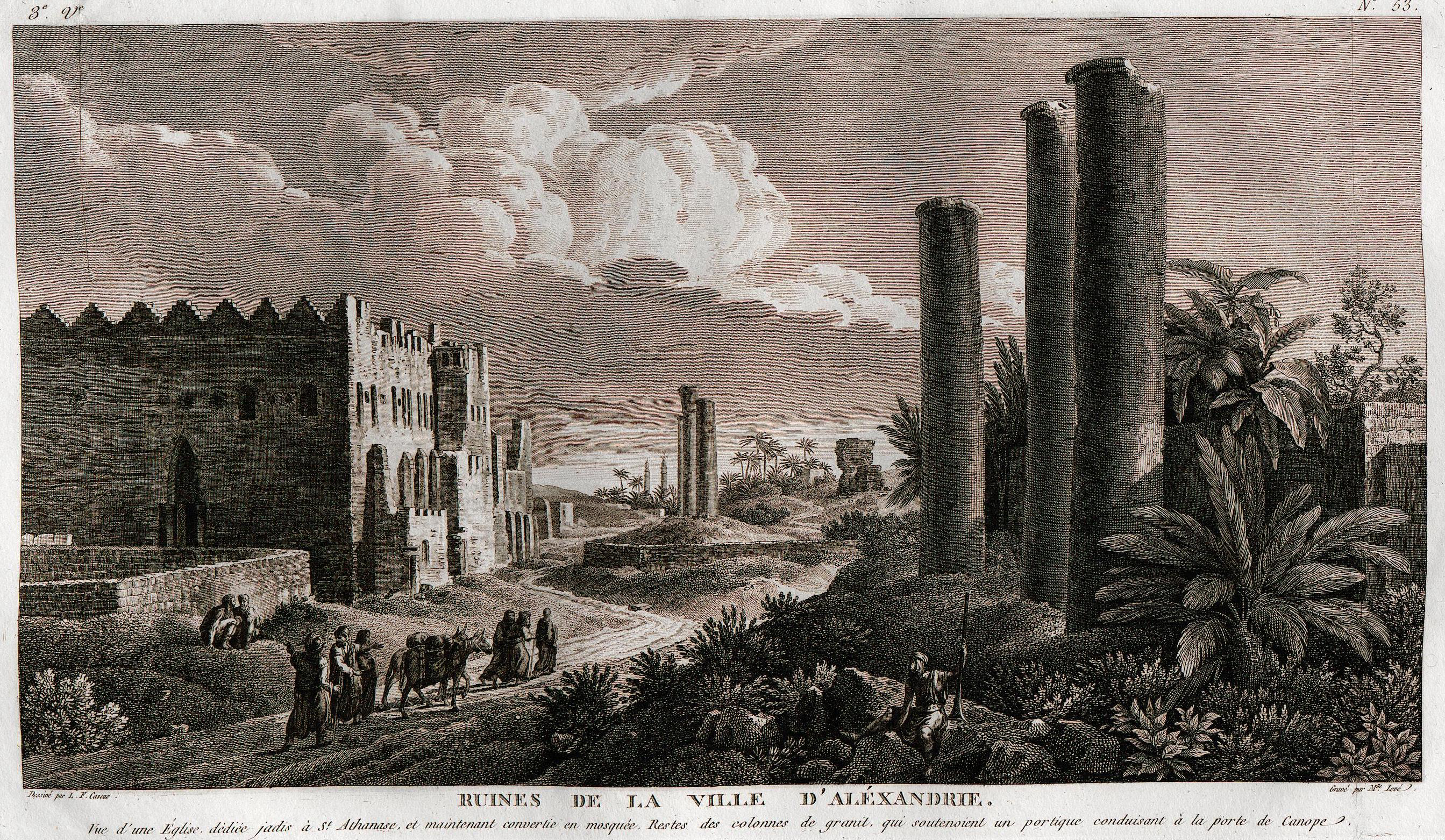
Engraving by L. F. Cassas of the Canopic Street in Alexandria, Egypt, made in 1784

Two main streets, lined with colonnades and said to have been each about 60 m (200 ft) wide, intersected in the centre of the city, close to the point where the Sema (or Soma) of Alexander (his Mausoleum) rose. This point is very near the present mosque of Nebi Daniel; the line of the great East–West "Canopic" street is also present in modern-day Alexandria, having only slightly diverged from the line of the modern Boulevard de Rosette (now Sharae Fouad). Traces of its pavement and canal have been found near the Rosetta Gate, but remnants of streets and canals were exposed in 1899 by German excavators outside the east fortifications, which lie well within the area of the ancient city.

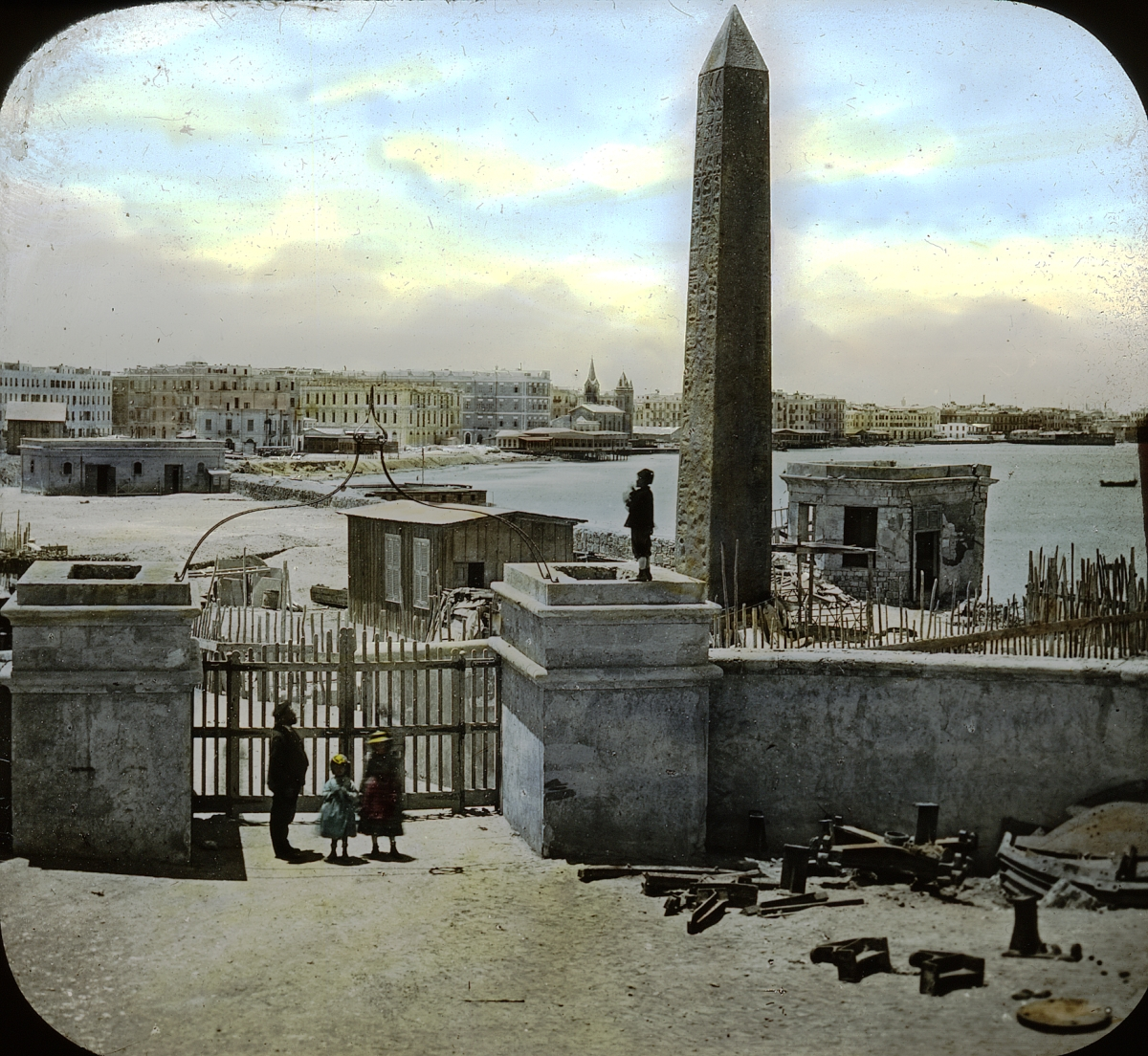
One of the pair of Cleopatra's Needles in Alexandria, which were relocated to London and New York in the late 19th century

Alexandria consisted originally of little more than the island of Pharos, which was joined to the mainland by a 1,260 m-long (4,130 ft) mole and called the Heptastadion ("seven stadia"—a stadium was a Greek unit of length measuring approximately 180 m or 590 ft). The end of this abutted on the land at the head of the present Grand Square, where the "Moon Gate" rose. All that now lies between that point and the modern "Ras al-Tin" quarter is built on the silt which gradually widened and obliterated this mole. The Ras al-Tin quarter represents all that is left of the island of Pharos, the site of the actual lighthouse having been weathered away by the sea. On the east of the mole was the Great Harbour, now an open bay; on the west lay the port of Eunostos, with its inner basin Kibotos, now vastly enlarged to form the modern harbour.

In Strabo's time (latter half of the 1st century BC), the principal buildings were as follows, enumerated as they were to be seen from a ship entering the Great Harbour.

1. The Royal Palaces, filling the northeast angle of the town and occupying the promontory of Lochias, which shut in the Great Harbour on the east. Lochias (the modern Pharillon) has almost entirely disappeared into the sea, together with the palaces, the "Private Port", and the island of Antirrhodus. There has been a land subsidence here, as throughout the northeast coast of Africa.
2. The Great Theater, on the modern Hospital Hill near the Ramleh station. This was used by Julius Caesar as a fortress, where he withstood a siege from the city mob after he took Egypt after the battle of Pharsalus.
3. The Poseidon, or Temple of the Sea God, close to the theater
4. The Timonium built by Marc Antony
5. The Emporium (Exchange)
6. The Apostases (Magazines)
7. The Navalia (Docks), lying west of the Timonium, along the seafront as far as the mole
8. Behind the Emporium rose the Great Caesareum, by which stood the two great obelisks which became known as "Cleopatra's Needles" and were transported to New York City and London. This temple became, in time, the Patriarchal Church, though some ancient remains of the temple have been discovered. The actual Caesareum, the parts not eroded by the waves, lies under the houses lining the new seawall.
9. The Gymnasium and the Palaestra are both inland, near the Boulevard de Rosette in the eastern half of the town; sites unknown.
10. The Temple of Saturn; site unknown.
11. The Mausolea of Alexander (Soma) and the Ptolemies in one ring-fence, near the point of intersection of the two main streets.
12. The Musaeum with its famous Library and theater in the same region; site unknown.
13. The Serapeum of Alexandria, the most famous of all Alexandrian temples. Strabo tells that this stood in the west of the city; and recent discoveries go far as to place it near "Pompey's Pillar", which was an independent monument erected to commemorate Diocletian's siege of the city.

The names of a few other public buildings on the mainland are known, but there is little information as to their actual position. None, however, are as famous as the building that stood on the eastern point of Pharos island. There, The Great Lighthouse, one of the Seven Wonders of the World, reputed to be 138 m (453 ft) high, was situated. The first Ptolemy began the project, and the second Ptolemy (Ptolemy II Philadelphus) completed it, at a total cost of 800 talents. It took 12 years to complete and served as a prototype for all later lighthouses in the world. The light was produced by a furnace at the top and the tower was built mostly with solid blocks of limestone. The Pharos lighthouse was destroyed by an earthquake in the 14th century, making it the second longest surviving ancient wonder, after the Great Pyramid of Giza. A temple of Hephaestus also stood on Pharos at the head of the mole.

In the 1st century, the population of Alexandria contained over 180,000 adult male citizens, according to a census dated from 32 AD, in addition to a large number of freedmen, women, children and slaves. Estimates of the total population range from 216,000 to 500,000, making it one of the largest cities ever built before the Industrial Revolution and the largest pre-industrial city that was not an imperial capital.

== Landmarks ==
=== Citadel of Qaitbay ===
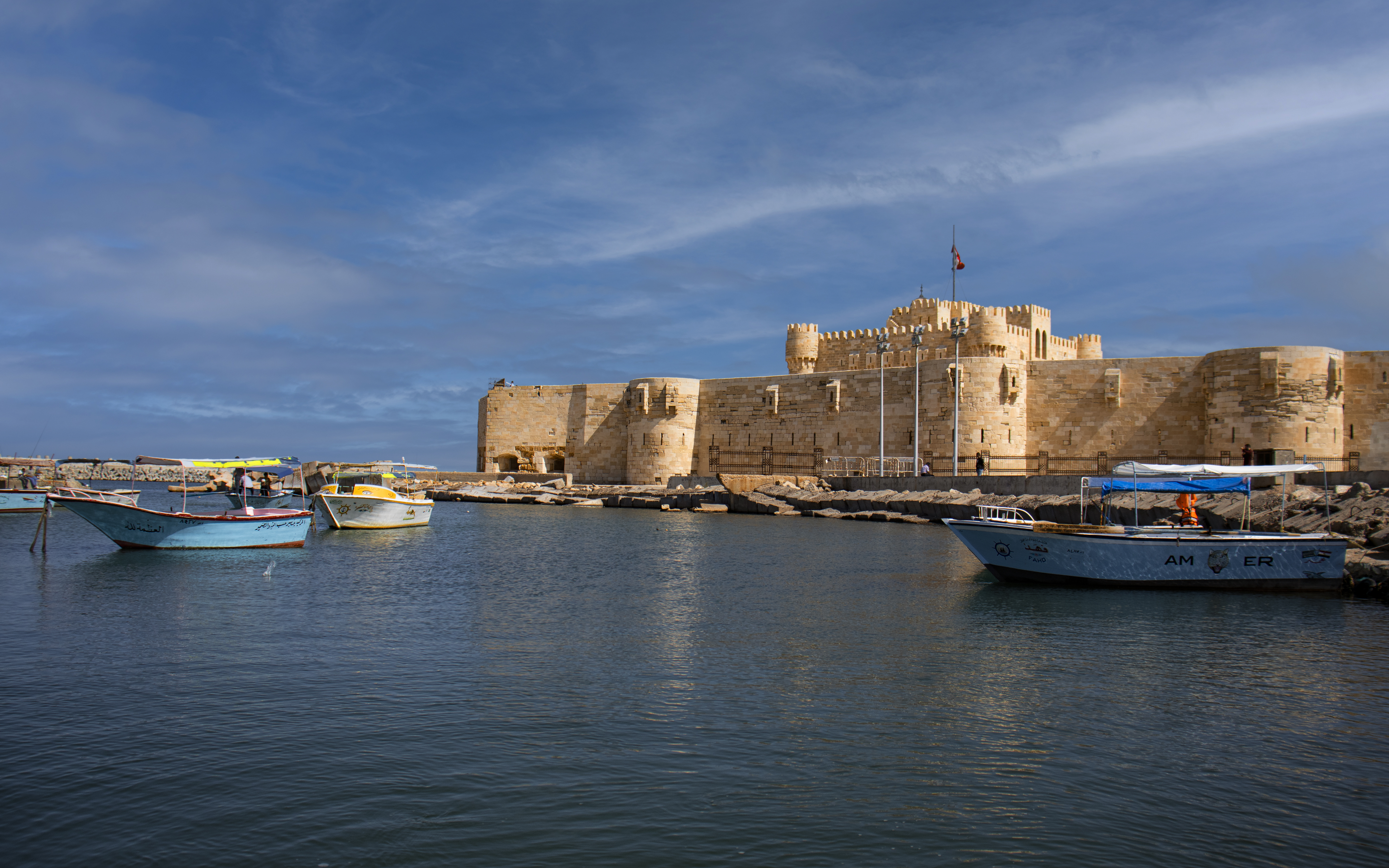
The Citadel seen from the Mediterranean

Citadel of Qaitbay is a defensive fortress located on the Mediterranean sea coast. It was established in 1477 AD (882 AH) by the Mamluk Sultan Al-Ashraf Sayf al-Din Qa'it Bay. The Citadel is located on the eastern side of the northern tip of Pharos Island at the mouth of the Eastern Harbour. It was erected on the exact site of the famous Lighthouse of Alexandria, which was one of the Seven Wonders of the Ancient World. It was built on an area of 17,550 square metres.

=== Pompey's Pillar ===
"Pompey's Pillar, a Roman triumphal column, is one of the best-known ancient monuments still standing in Alexandria today. It is located on Alexandria's ancient acropolis—a modest hill located adjacent to the city's Arab cemetery—and was originally part of a temple colonnade. Including its pedestal, it is 30 m (99 ft) high; the shaft is of polished red granite, 2.7 m (8.9 ft) in diameter at the base, tapering to 2.4 m (7.9 ft) at the top. The shaft is 88 ft (27 m) high and made out of a single piece of granite. Its volume is 132 m^{3} (4,662 cu ft) and weight approximately 396 tons. Pompey's Pillar may have been erected using the same methods that were used to erect the ancient obelisks. Roger Hopkins and Mark Lehrner conducted several obelisk erecting experiments including a successful attempt to erect a 25-ton obelisk in 1999.

=== Catacombs of Kom El Shoqafa ===
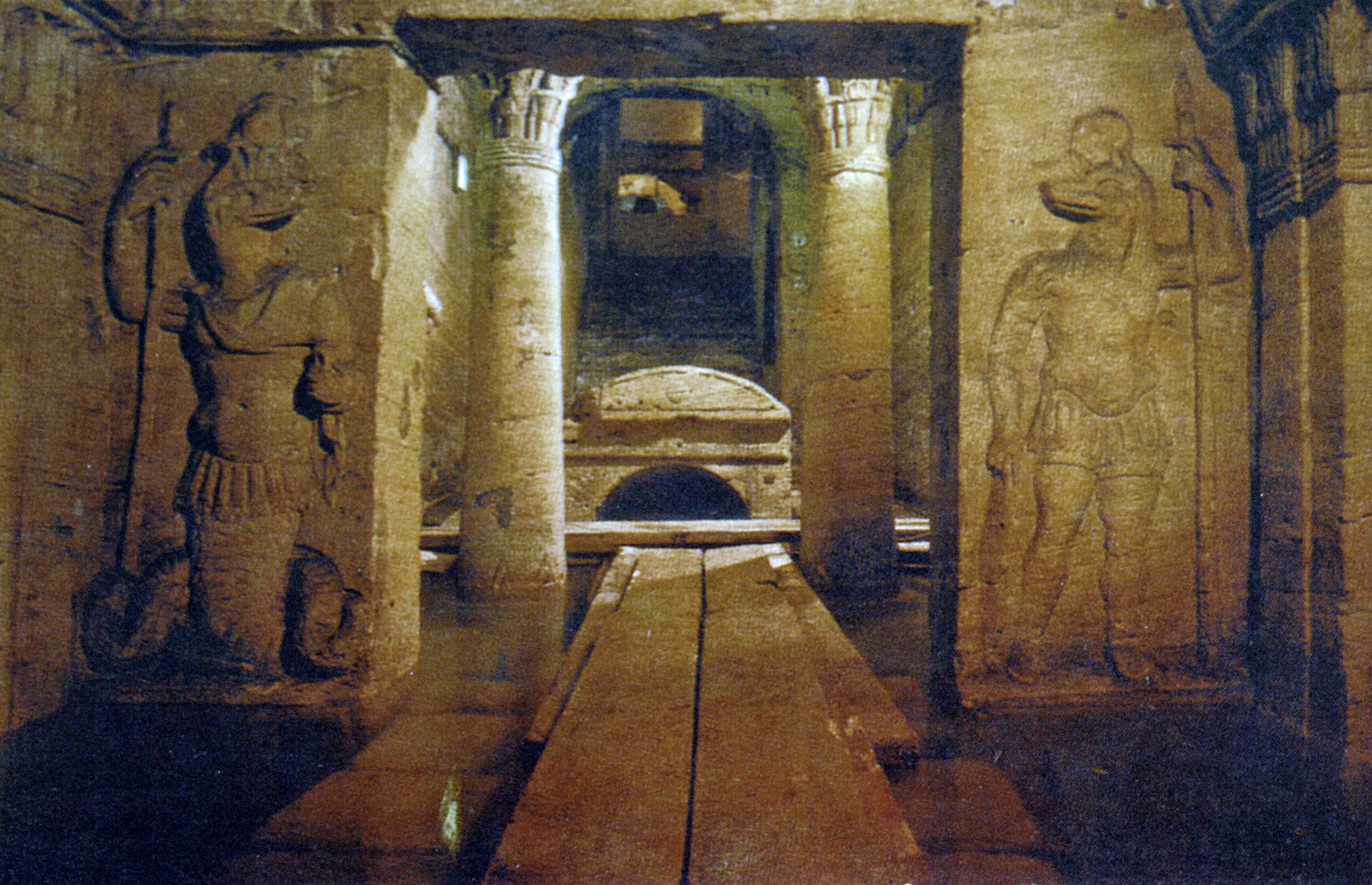
Catacombs of Kom El Shoqafa

Alexandria's catacombs, known as Kom El Shoqafa, are a short distance southwest of the pillar, consist of a multi-level labyrinth, reached via a large spiral staircase and featuring dozens of chambers adorned with sculpted pillars, statues, and other syncretic Romano-Egyptian religious symbols, burial niches, and sarcophagi. The catacombs were long forgotten by the citizens until they were discovered by accident in 1900.

=== Kom El Deka ===
The most extensive ancient excavation currently being conducted in Alexandria is known as Kom El Deka. It has revealed the ancient city's well-preserved theater, and the remains of its Roman-era baths.

=== Alexandria Naval Unknown Soldier Memorial ===
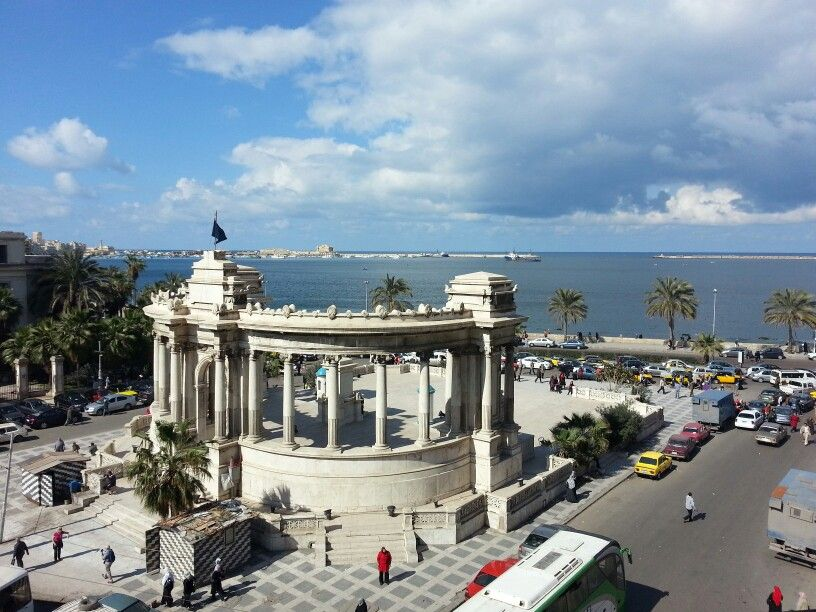
Rear view of the Alexandria Naval Unknown Soldier Memorial

The Alexandria Naval Unknown Soldier Memorial is a prominent historical monument located in the Manshaya district along the corniche. Built in 1933 to honor Khedive Ismail, and a statue of him was erected at the top of the monument. It was later transformed into the Monument to the Unknown Soldier in 1965, and the statue of Khedive Ismail was removed. The monument is distinguished by its location overlooking the Mediterranean Sea, which has witnessed the glories and heroic deeds of the Egyptian Navy throughout history, and serves as a memorial to its martyrs.

=== Temple of Taposiris Magna ===
The temple was built in the Ptolemy era and dedicated to Osiris, which finished the construction of Alexandria. It is located in Abusir, the western suburb of Alexandria in Borg el Arab city. Only the outer wall and the pylons remain from the temple. There is evidence to prove that sacred animals were worshiped there. Archaeologists found an animal necropolis near the temple. Remains of a Christian church show that the temple was used as a church in later centuries. Also found in the same area are remains of public baths built by the emperor Justinian, a seawall, quays and a bridge. Near the beach side of the area, there are the remains of a tower built by Ptolemy II Philadelphus. The tower was an exact scale replica of the destroyed Alexandrine Pharos Lighthouse.

=== Montaza Palace ===
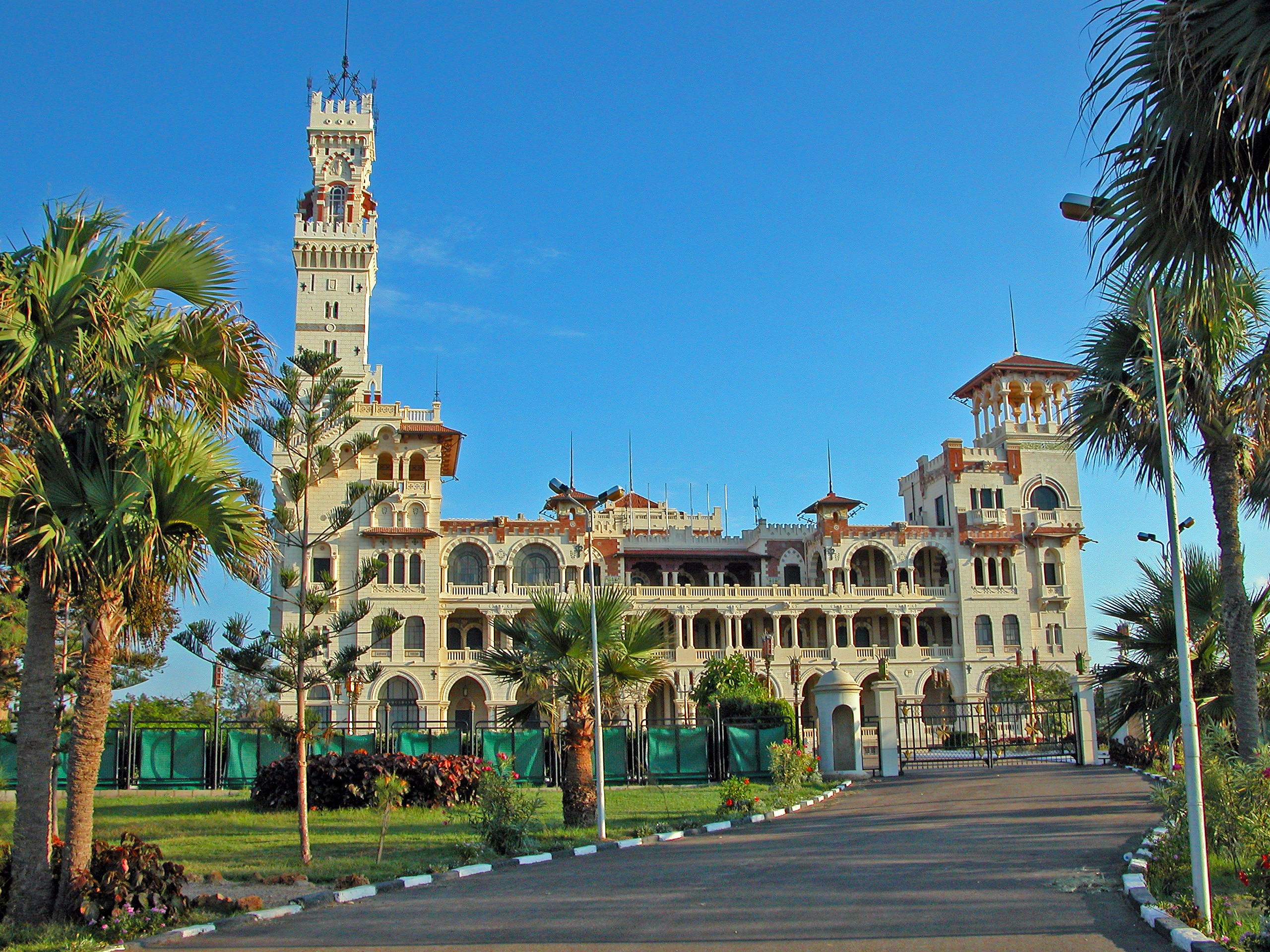
The Haramlek Palace at Montaza Park

Al-Montaza (meaning "the garden") is a historic park and palace complex located along the coast in eastern Alexandria. It was created in 1892 by Abbas Hilmy II, the last Khedive of Egypt. In addition to landscaping a large area of gardens, the Khedive built two main palace structures, the Salamlek and the Haramlek, which still stand today. The site was opened to the public after the 1952 Revolution and is now one of the largest public parks in Alexandria.

== Excavation ==
Persistent efforts have been made to explore the antiquities of Alexandria. Encouragement and help have been given by the local Archaeological Society and by many individuals. Excavations were performed in the city by Greeks seeking the tomb of Alexander the Great without success. The past and present directors of the museum have been enabled from time to time to carry out systematic excavations whenever opportunity is offered; D. G. Hogarth made tentative researches on behalf of the Egypt Exploration Fund and the Society for the Promotion of Hellenic Studies in 1895; and a German expedition worked for two years (1898–1899). But two difficulties face the would-be excavator in Alexandria: lack of space for excavation and the underwater location of some areas of interest.

Since the great and growing modern city stands immediately over the ancient one, it is almost impossible to find any considerable space in which to dig, except at enormous cost. Cleopatra VII's royal quarters were inundated by earthquakes and tsunami, leading to gradual subsidence in the 4th century AD. This underwater section, containing many of the most interesting sections of the Hellenistic city, including the palace quarter, has been explored since 1992 and is still being extensively investigated by the French underwater archaeologist Franck Goddio and his team. It raised numerous artefacts, among them a noted head of Caesarion. The remains of a temple to Isis on the sunken island of Antirhodos in the eastern port of Alexandria have been gradually discovered, excavated and identified over a period of 30 years by Goddio's team and published by the Oxford Centre for Maritime Archaeology in 2025. Some parts of the city's port being opened up to tourists, to some controversy. The spaces that are most open are the low grounds to northeast and southwest, where it is practically impossible to get below the Roman strata.

Some results were those achieved by Dr. G. Botti, late director of the museum, in the neighbourhood of "Pompey's Pillar". Here, substructures of a large building or group of buildings have been exposed. Nearby, immense catacombs and columbaria have been opened which may have been appendages of the temple. These contained a vault with curious painted reliefs, which has now been artificially lit and opened to visitors.

The objects found in these researches are in the museum, the most notable being a great basalt bull, probably once an object of cult in the Serapeum. Other catacombs and tombs have been opened in Kom El Shoqafa (Roman) and Ras El Tin (painted).

The German excavation team found remains of a Ptolemaic colonnade and streets in the north-east of the city, but little else. Hogarth explored part of an immense brick structure under the mound of Kom El Deka, which may have been part of the Paneum, the Mausolea, or a Roman fortress.

The making of the new foreshore led to the dredging up of remains of the Patriarchal Church; and the foundations of modern buildings are seldom laid without some objects of antiquity being discovered.

== Education ==
=== Colleges and universities ===
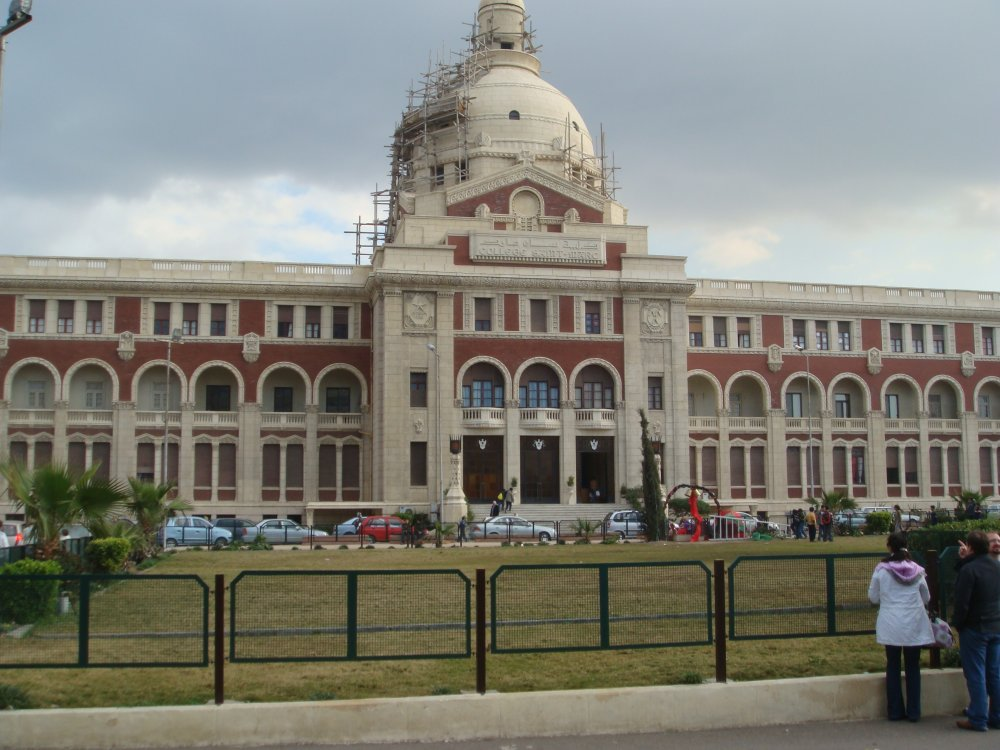
Collège Saint Marc

Alexandria has a number of higher education institutions. Alexandria University is a public university that follows the Egyptian system of higher education. Many of its faculties are internationally renowned, most notably the Faculty of Medicine and the Faculty of Engineering. In addition, the Egypt-Japan University of Science and Technology in New Borg El Arab city is a research university set up in collaboration between the Japanese and Egyptian governments in 2010. The Arab Academy for Science, Technology & Maritime Transport is a semi-private educational institution that offers courses for high school, undergraduate level, and postgraduate students. It is considered the most reputable university in Egypt after the AUC American University in Cairo because of its worldwide recognition from board of engineers at UK & ABET in US. Université Senghor is a private French university that focuses on the teaching of humanities, politics and international relations, which mainly recruits students from the African continent. Other institutions of higher education in Alexandria include Alexandria Institute of Technology (AIT) and Pharos University in Alexandria.

In September 2023, The Greek University of Patras announced that it is opening a branch in Alexandria, in a first-of-its-kind move by a Greek higher education institution. The Greek university of Patras branch will operate two departments, one Greek-speaking and one English-speaking in the subjects of Greek culture, Greek language and Greek philosophy.

=== Schools ===
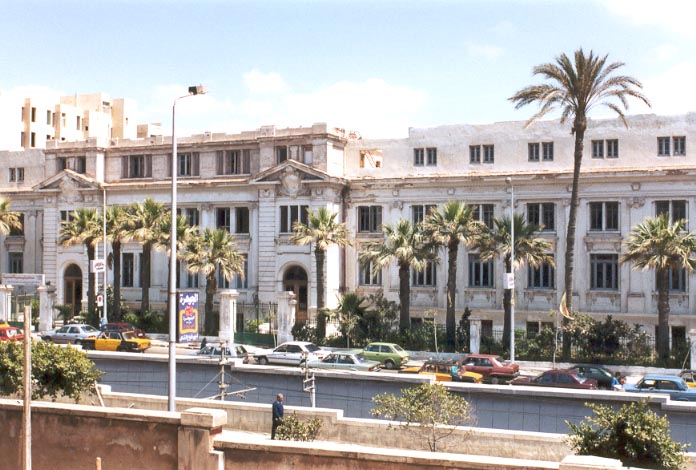
Lycée Français d'Alexandrie

Alexandria has a long history of foreign educational institutions. The first foreign schools date to the early 19th century, when French missionaries began establishing French charitable schools to educate the Egyptians. Today, the most important French schools in Alexandria run by Catholic missionaries include Collège de la Mère de Dieu, Collège Notre Dame de Sion, Collège Saint Marc, Écoles des Soeurs Franciscaines (four different schools), École Girard, École Saint Gabriel, École Saint-Vincent de Paul, École Saint Joseph, École Sainte Catherine, and Institution Sainte Jeanne-Antide. As a reaction to the establishment of French religious institutions, a secular (laic) mission established Lycée el-Horreya, which initially followed a French system of education, but is currently run by the Egyptian government. The only school in Alexandria that completely follows the French educational system is Lycée Français d'Alexandrie (École Champollion). It is usually frequented by the children of French expatriates and diplomats in Alexandria. The Italian school is the Istituto "Don Bosco".

English-language schools in Alexandria are the most popular; those in the city include; Riada American School, Riada Language School, Forsan American School, Forsan International School, Alexandria Language School, Future Language School, Future International Schools (Future IGCSE, Future American School and Future German school), Alexandria American School, British School of Alexandria, Egyptian American School, Pioneers Language School, Egyptian English Language School, Princesses Girls' School, Sidi Gaber Language School, Zahran Language School, Taymour English School, Sacred Heart Girls' School, Schutz American School, Victoria College, El Manar Language School for Girls, Kawmeya Language School, El Nasr Boys' School (previously called British Boys' School), and El Nasr Girls' College (previously called English Girls' College).

There are also two German schools in Alexandria which are Deutsche Schule der Borromäerinnen (DSB of Saint Charles Borromé) and Neue Deutsche Schule Alexandria. The Montessori educational system was first introduced in Alexandria in 2009 at Alexandria Montessori.

=== Women ===
Around the 1890s, twice the percentage of women in Alexandria knew how to read compared to Cairo. As a result, specialist women's publications like al-Fatāh by Hind Nawal, the country's first women's journal, appeared.

Alexandria joined the UNESCO Global Network of Learning Cities in 2024.

== Transport ==
=== Air ===
Alexandria International Airport

The city's principal airport is currently Alexandria International Airport, which is located about 25 km (16 mi) away from the city centre, which is now composed of 2 Terminals. Terminal 1 is the old terminal which was opened in February 2010 whereas Terminal 2 is the Brand New Terminal and was inaugurated in 2025.

==== Roads ====
Among the most important are three main roads that run parallel and connect the city center to its eastern parts: Alexandria Corniche (or El-Geish Road), which is approximately 17 km long and connects the Bahary area in the west to the Mandara area in the east; Al-Horreya Road (or Abu Qir Road), about 10 km long, linking the Shallalat area in the west to the Victoria area in the east; and Al-Mahmoudia Axis, which is 23 km long and connects the El Qabary area in the west to the Abis villages in the southeast. In addition to these, the city include other major roads such as Fouad Street, considered the oldest street in Alexandria, Suez Canal Street, El-Nabi Daniel Street, Port Said Street, Sultan Hussein Street, and the Ring Road. Alexandria also include several highways, such as the Cairo–Alexandria Desert Road, the Cairo–Alexandria Agricultural Road, and the International Coastal Road.

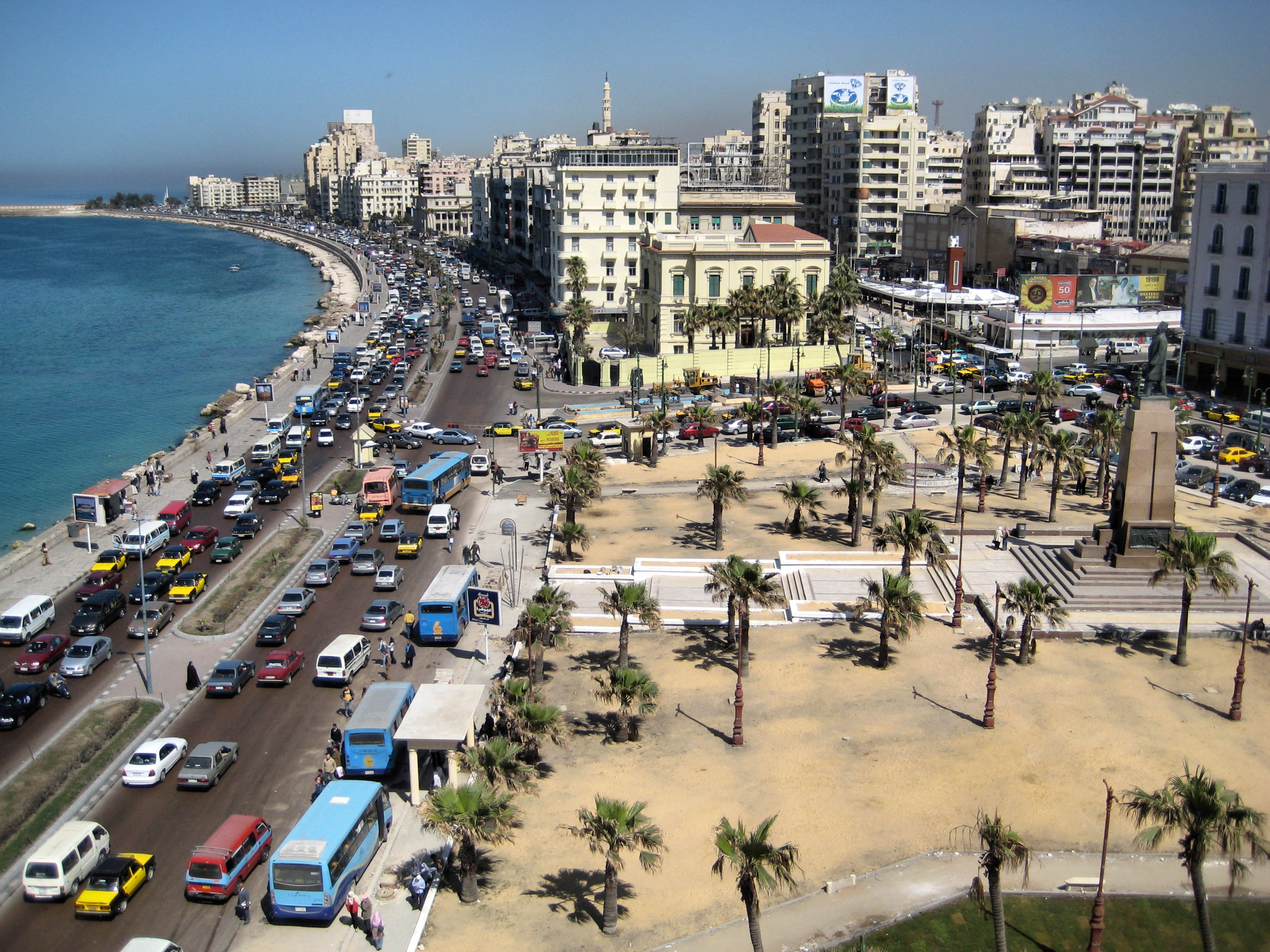
The Alexandria Corniche, a major waterfront roadway

=== Port ===
Alexandria has four ports; namely the Western Port also known as Alexandria Port. Also the Dekhela Port is located in the west of the Alexandria Port. The Eastern Port which is mainly used as a yachting harbour, and Abu Qir Port at the northern east of the governorate. It is a commercial port for general cargo and phosphates.

=== Rail ===
Alexandria's intracity commuter rail system extends from Misr Station (Alexandria's primary intercity railway station) to Abu Qir, parallel to the tram line. The commuter line's locomotives operate on diesel, as opposed to the overhead-electric tram.

Alexandria plays hosts to two intercity railway stations; Misr Station and Sidi Gaber railway station (in the district of Sidi Gaber in the centre of the eastern expansion in which most Alexandrines reside), both of which also serve the commuter rail line. Intercity passenger service is operated by Egyptian National Railways.

=== Bus system ===
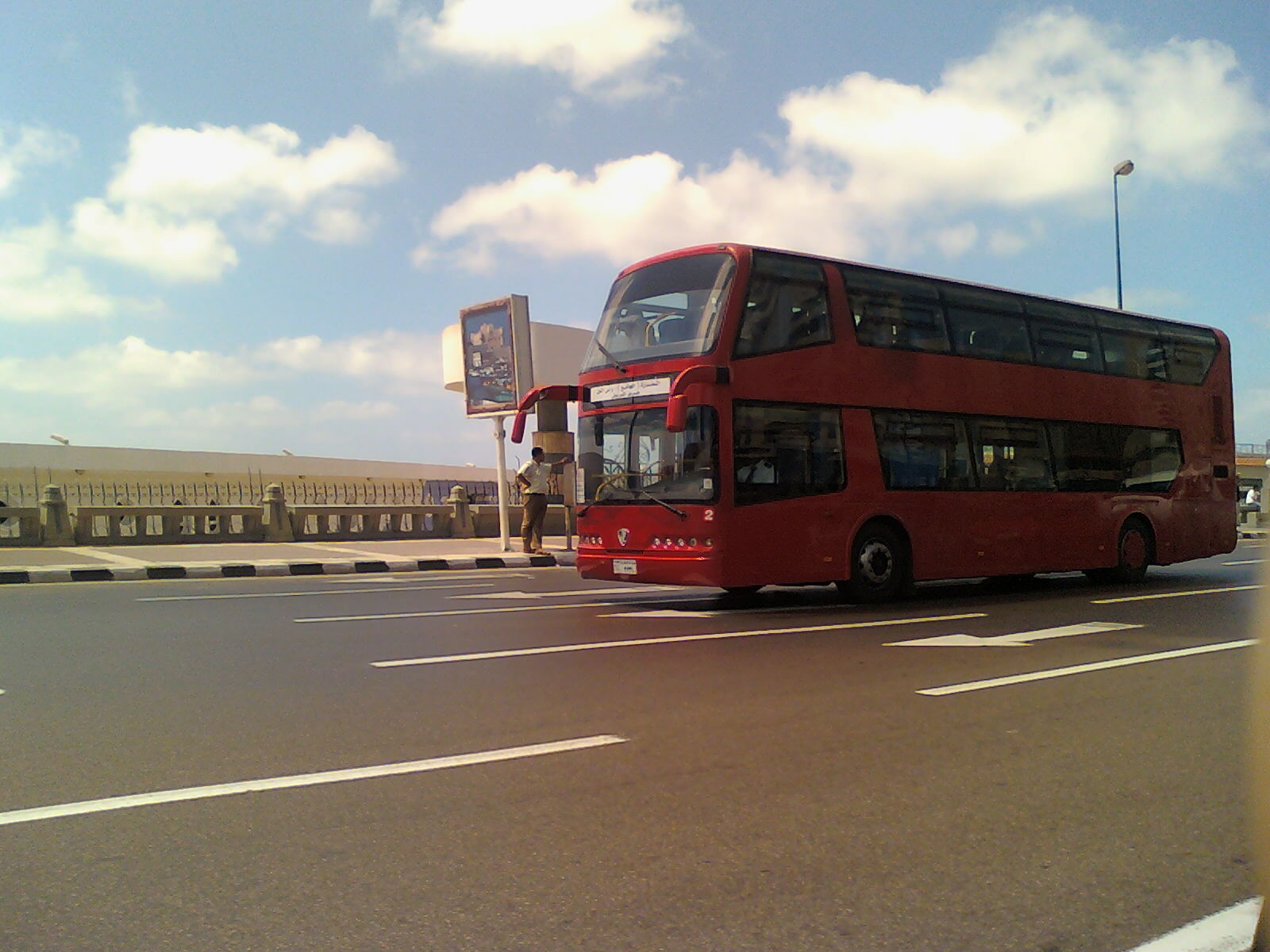
Alexandria double decker bus

Alexandria also includes a public bus transport network operated by the Alexandria Passenger Transport Authority, in addition to other private companies. The number of bus routes belonging to the Alexandria Passenger Transport Authority in July 2023 was 103 routes, and they operate various types of medium, large, regular and air-conditioned buses, and are divided into four areas: sixteen routes for Moharam Bek buses, twenty routes for Central buses, twenty-nine routes for East buses, and thirty-eight routes for West buses, in addition to microbus routes and taxis distinguished by the colors yellow and black. Muharram Bek station is considered the main bus station that includes all means of transport that connect with neighboring cities and governorates.

=== Metro ===
Construction of the Alexandria Metro was due to begin in 2020 at a cost of $1.05 billion.

=== Trams ===
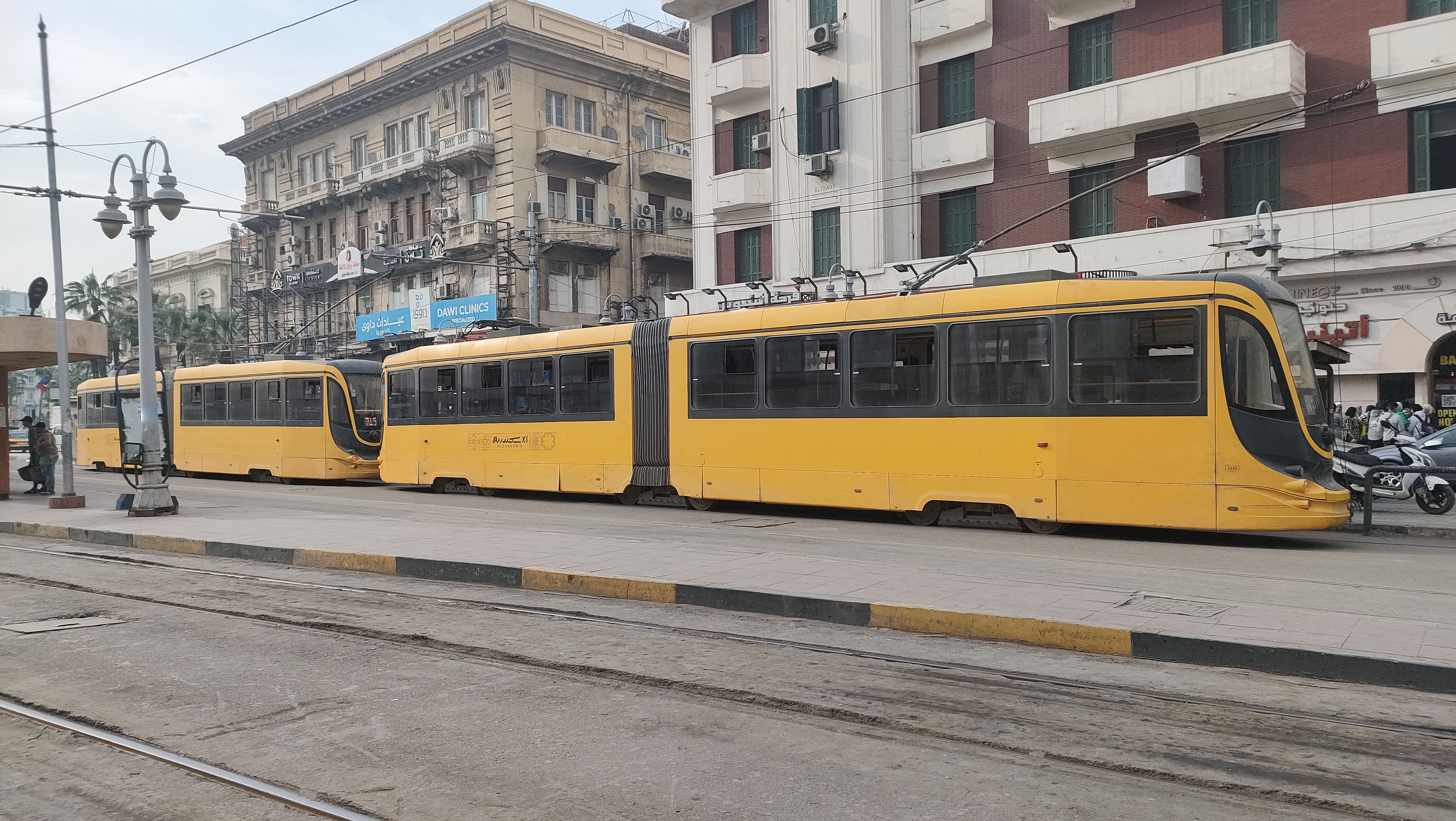
An Alexandria tram

An extensive tramway network was built in 1860 and is the oldest in Africa. The network begins at the El Raml district in the west and ends in the Victoria district in the east.

== Culture ==
=== Libraries ===
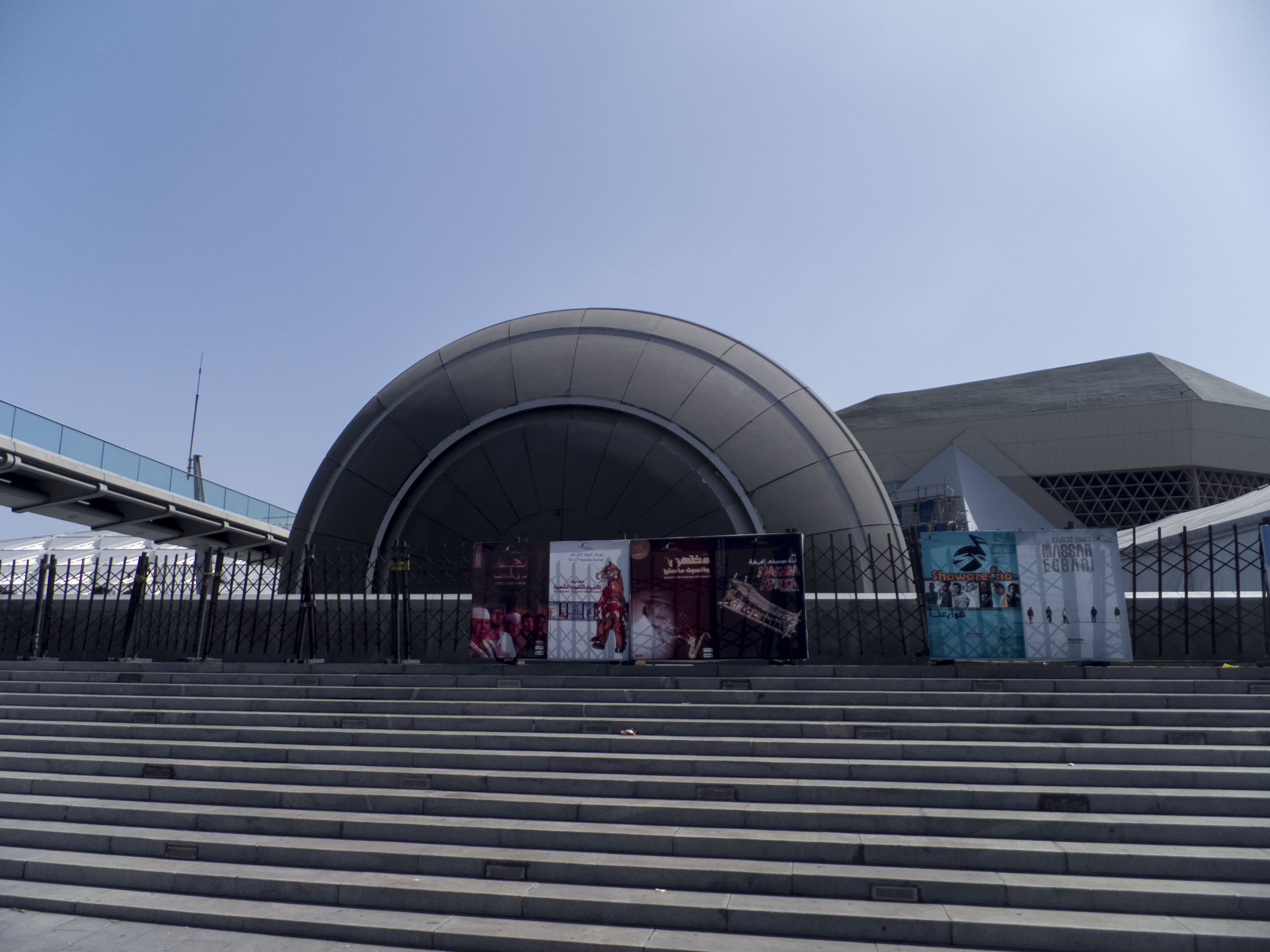
The Bibliotheca Alexandrina

The Royal Library of Alexandria, in Alexandria, Egypt, was once the largest library in the world. It is generally thought to have been founded at the beginning of the 3rd century BC, during the reign of Ptolemy II of Egypt. It was likely created after his father had built what would become the first part of the library complex, the temple of the Muses—the Museion, Greek Μουσείον (from which the Modern English word museum is derived).

It has been reasonably established that the library, or parts of the collection, were destroyed by fire on a number of occasions (library fires were common and replacement of handwritten manuscripts was very difficult, expensive, and time-consuming). To this day, the details of the destruction (or destructions) remain a lively source of controversy.

The Bibliotheca Alexandrina was inaugurated in 2002, near the site of the old Library. The library hosts annually the Alexandria International Film Festival.

=== Museums ===
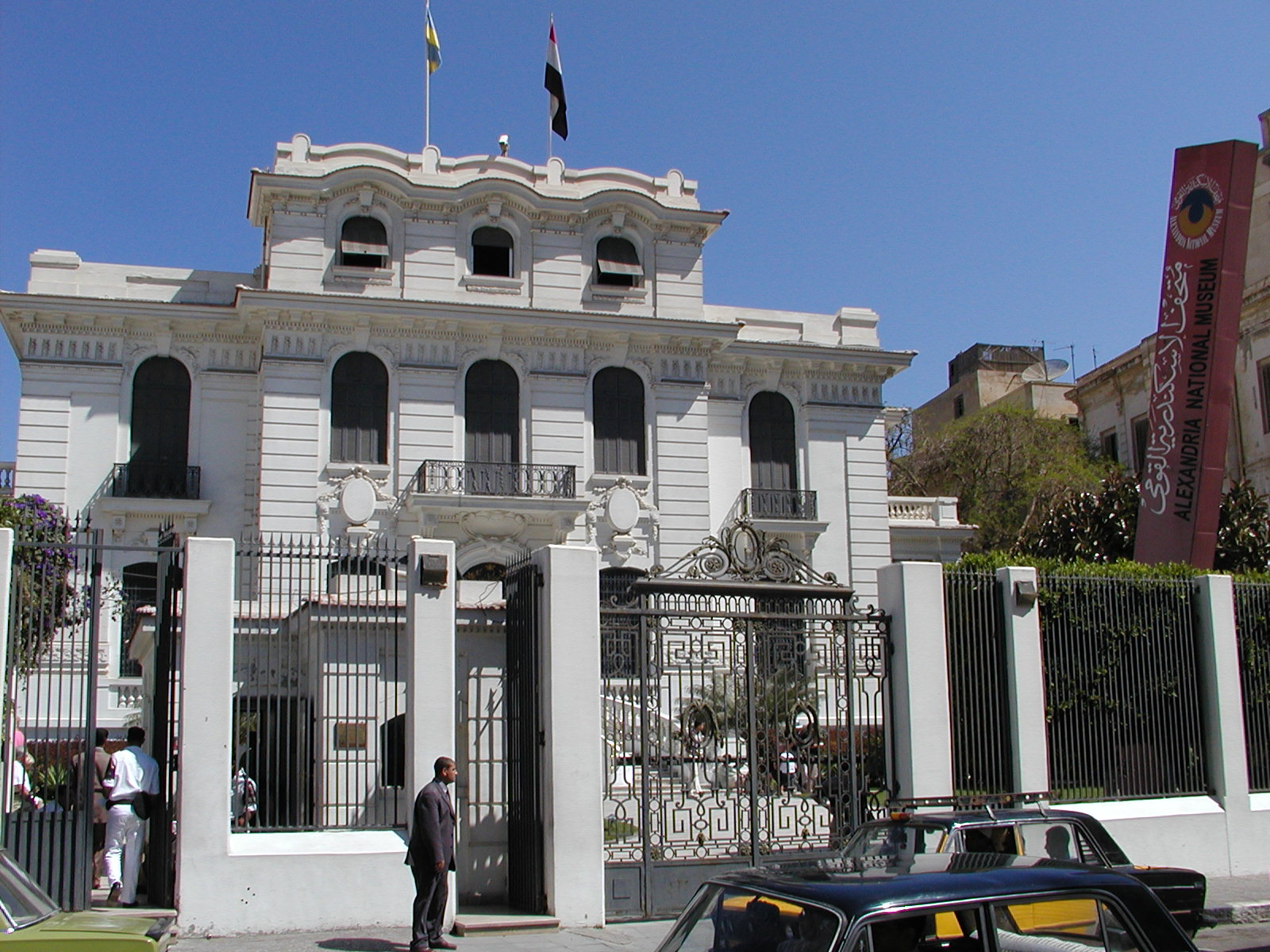
The Alexandria National Museum

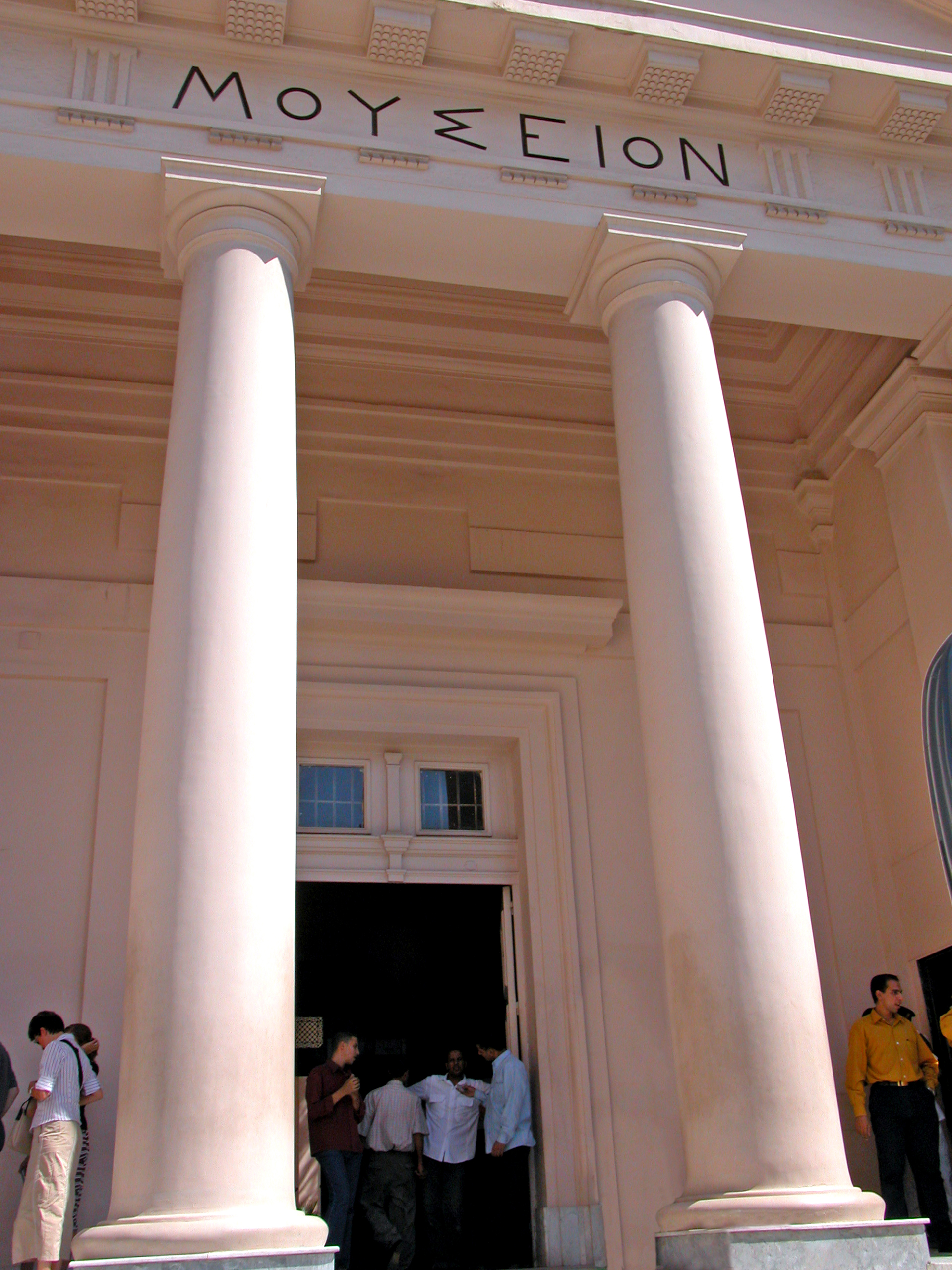
Graeco-Roman Museum

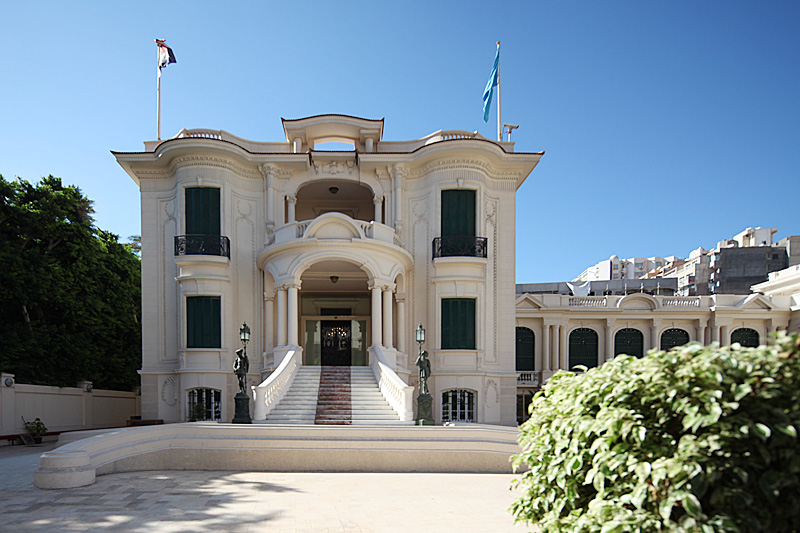
Royal Jewelry Museum

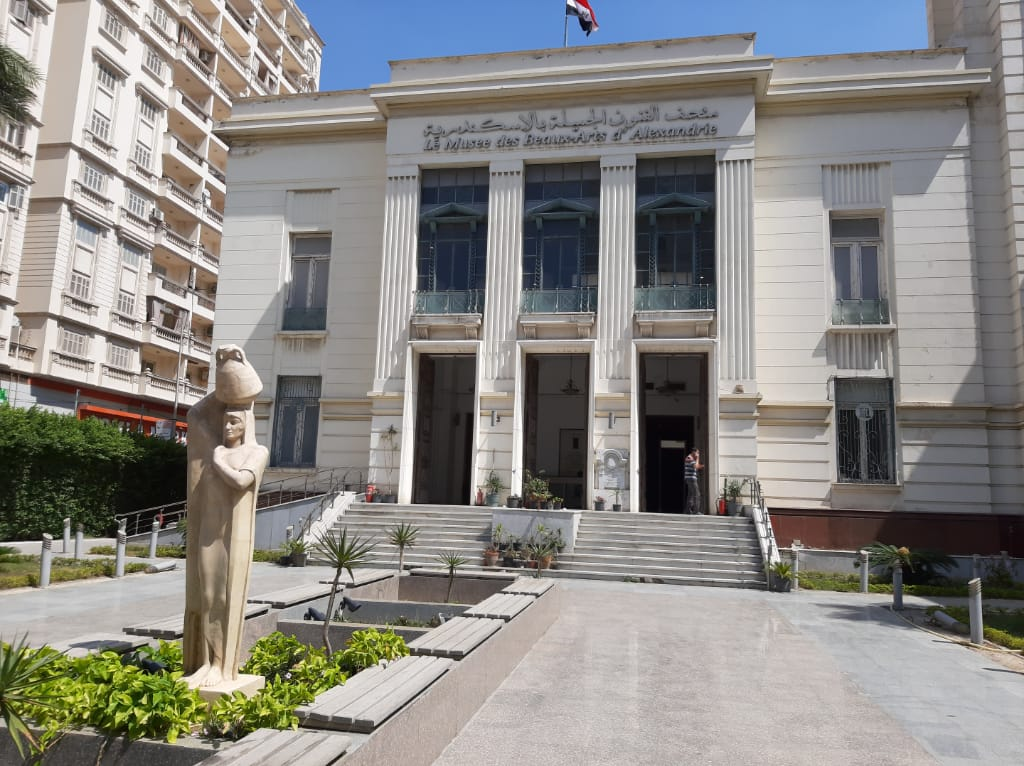
Museum of Fine Arts

The Alexandria National Museum was inaugurated 31 December 2003. It is located in a restored Italian style palace in Tariq El Horreya Street (formerly Rue Fouad), near the centre of the city. It contains about 1,800 artifacts that narrate the story of Alexandria and Egypt. Most of these pieces came from other Egyptian museums. The museum is housed in the old Al-Saad Bassili Pasha Palace, who was one of the wealthiest wood merchants in Alexandria. Construction on the site was first undertaken in 1926.

The Graeco-Roman Museum was the city's main archeological museum, focused on artifacts from its Greco-Roman period. It was opened in 1892 and was closed in 2005 for extensive renovations and expansion. The museum re-opened to the public in October 2023.

The Alexandria Museum of Fine Arts is a museum for Egyptian and Middle-Eastern fine art situated in the Moharam Bek neighborhood of Alexandria, Egypt. The museum houses a collection of works by Egyptian artists and a selection of works from Baroque, Romanticism, Rococo and Orientalism. In addition, noteworthy examples of carving, printing and sculpture from Egyptian and European artists.

Other museums in the city include the Cavafy Museum, the Museum of Fine Arts, and the Royal Jewelry Museum.

=== Theaters ===
Alexandria Opera House hosts performances of classical music, Arabic music, ballet, and opera.

=== Poetry ===
During the Hellenistic period, poets evolving in the court of Ptolemy II Philadelphus (Philiscus of Corcyra, Lycophron, Alexander Aetolus, Sositheus,...) are currently known as the Alexandrian Pleiad.

In modern times, Constantine P. Cavafy, a major Greek poet who was born and lived in Alexandria used several themes associated with this city in his work: "Alexandrian Kings", "In Alexandria, 31 B.C.", "Myres: Alexandria 340 A.D", "Kaisarion" and "The God Abandons Antony".

== Places of worship ==
=== Islam ===
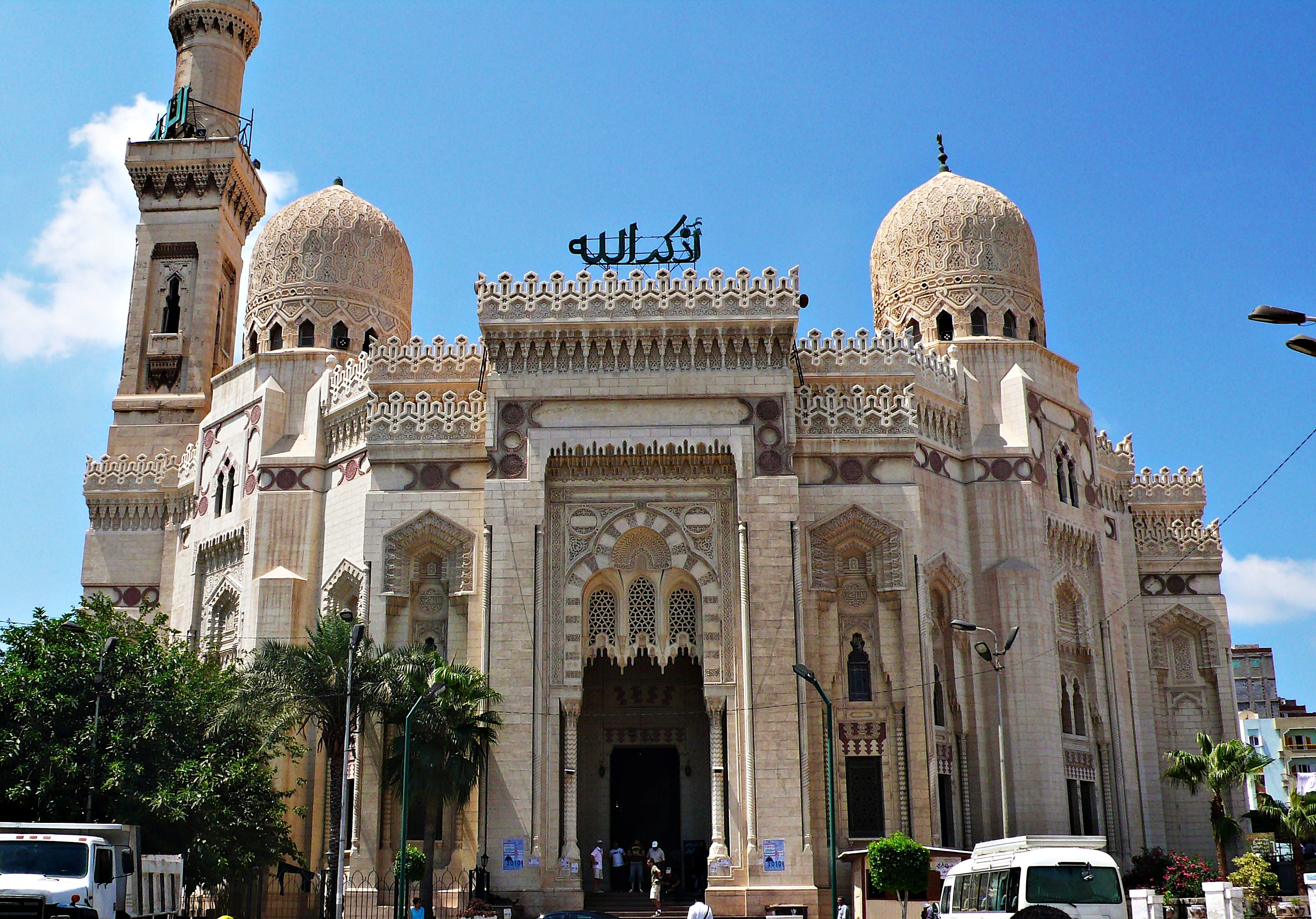
Abu al-Abbas al-Mursi Mosque

The most famous mosque in Alexandria is Abu al-Abbas al-Mursi Mosque in Bahary. Other notable mosques in the city include Ali ibn Abi Talib mosque in Somouha, Bilal mosque, al-Gamaa al-Bahari in Mandara, Hatem mosque in Somouha, Hoda el-Islam mosque in Sidi Bishr, al-Mowasah mosque in Hadara, Sharq al-Madina mosque in Miami, al-Shohadaa mosque in Mostafa Kamel, Al Qa'ed Ibrahim Mosque, Yehia mosque in Zizinia, Sidi Gaber mosque in Sidi Gaber, Sidi Besher mosque, Rokay el-Islam mosque in Elessway, Elsadaka Mosque in Sidibesher Qebly, Elshatbi mosque and Sultan mosque.

Alexandria is the base of the Salafi movements in Egypt. Al-Nour Party, which is based in the city and overwhelmingly won most of the Salafi votes in the 2011–12 parliamentary election, supports the president Abdel Fattah el-Sisi.

=== Christianity ===
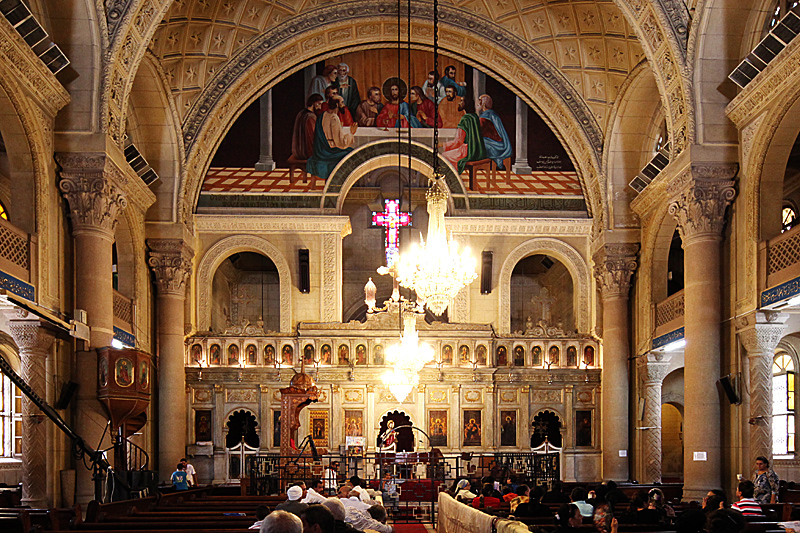
Saint Mark's Coptic Orthodox Cathedral

Alexandria was once considered the third-most important city in Christianity, after Rome and Constantinople. Until 430, the Patriarch of Alexandria was second only to the bishop of Rome. The Church of Alexandria had jurisdiction over most of the continent of Africa. After the Council of Chalcedon in AD 451, the Alexandrian Church split between the Miaphysites and the Melkites. The Miaphysites went on to constitute what is known today as the Coptic Orthodox Church. The Melkites went on to constitute what is known today as the Greek Orthodox Church of Alexandria. In the 19th century, Catholic and Protestant missionaries converted some of the adherents of the Orthodox churches to their respective faiths.

Today the Patriarchal seat of the Pope of the Coptic Orthodox Church is Saint Mark Cathedral (though in practice the Patriarch has long resided in Cairo). The most important Coptic Orthodox churches in Alexandria include Pope Cyril I Church in Cleopatra, Saint George's Church in Sporting, Saint Mark and Pope Peter I Church in Sidi Bishr, Saint Mary Church in Assafra, Saint Mary Church in Gianaclis, Saint Mina Church in Fleming, Saint Mina Church in Mandara and Saint Takla Haymanot's Church in Ibrahimeya.

The most important Eastern Orthodox churches in Alexandria are Agioi Anárgyroi Church, Church of the Annunciation, Saint Anthony Church, Archangels Gabriel and Michael Church, Taxiarchon Church, Saint Catherine Church, Cathedral of the Dormition in Mansheya, Church of the Dormition, Prophet Elijah Church, Saint George Church, Saint Joseph Church in Fleming, Saint Joseph of Arimathea Church, Saint Mark and Saint Nektarios Chapel in Ramleh, Saint Nicholas Church, Saint Paraskevi Church, Saint Sava Cathedral in Ramleh, Saint Theodore Chapel and the Russian church of Saint Alexander Nevsky in Alexandria, which serves the Russian speaking community in the city.

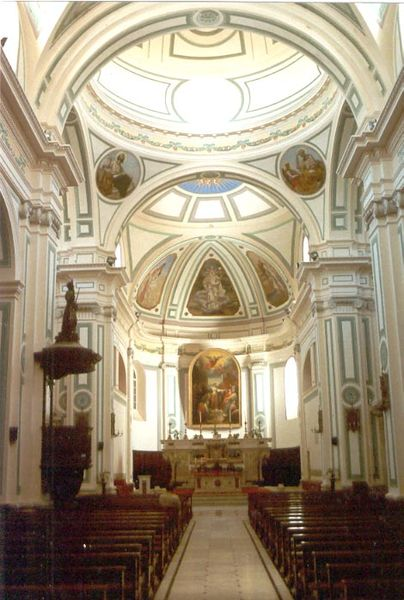
Saint Catherine's Latin Catholic Cathedral

The Apostolic Vicariate of Alexandria in Egypt-Heliopolis-Port Said has jurisdiction over all Latin Catholics in Egypt. Member churches include Saint Catherine Church in Mansheya and Church of the Jesuits in Cleopatra. The city is also the nominal see of the Melkite Greek Catholic titular Patriarchate of Alexandria (generally vested in its leading Patriarch of Antioch) and the actual cathedral see of its Patriarchal territory of Egypt, Sudan and South Sudan, which uses the Byzantine Rite, and the nominal see of the Armenian Catholic Eparchy of Alexandria (for all Egypt and Sudan, whose actual cathedral is in Cairo), a suffragan of the Armenian Catholic Patriarch of Cilicia, using the Armenian Rite.

The Saint Mark Church in Shatby, founded as part of Collège Saint Marc, is multi-denominational and holds liturgies according to Latin Catholic, Coptic Catholic and Coptic Orthodox rites.

In antiquity Alexandria was a major centre of the cosmopolitan religious movement called Gnosticism (today mainly remembered as a Christian heresy).

=== Judaism ===
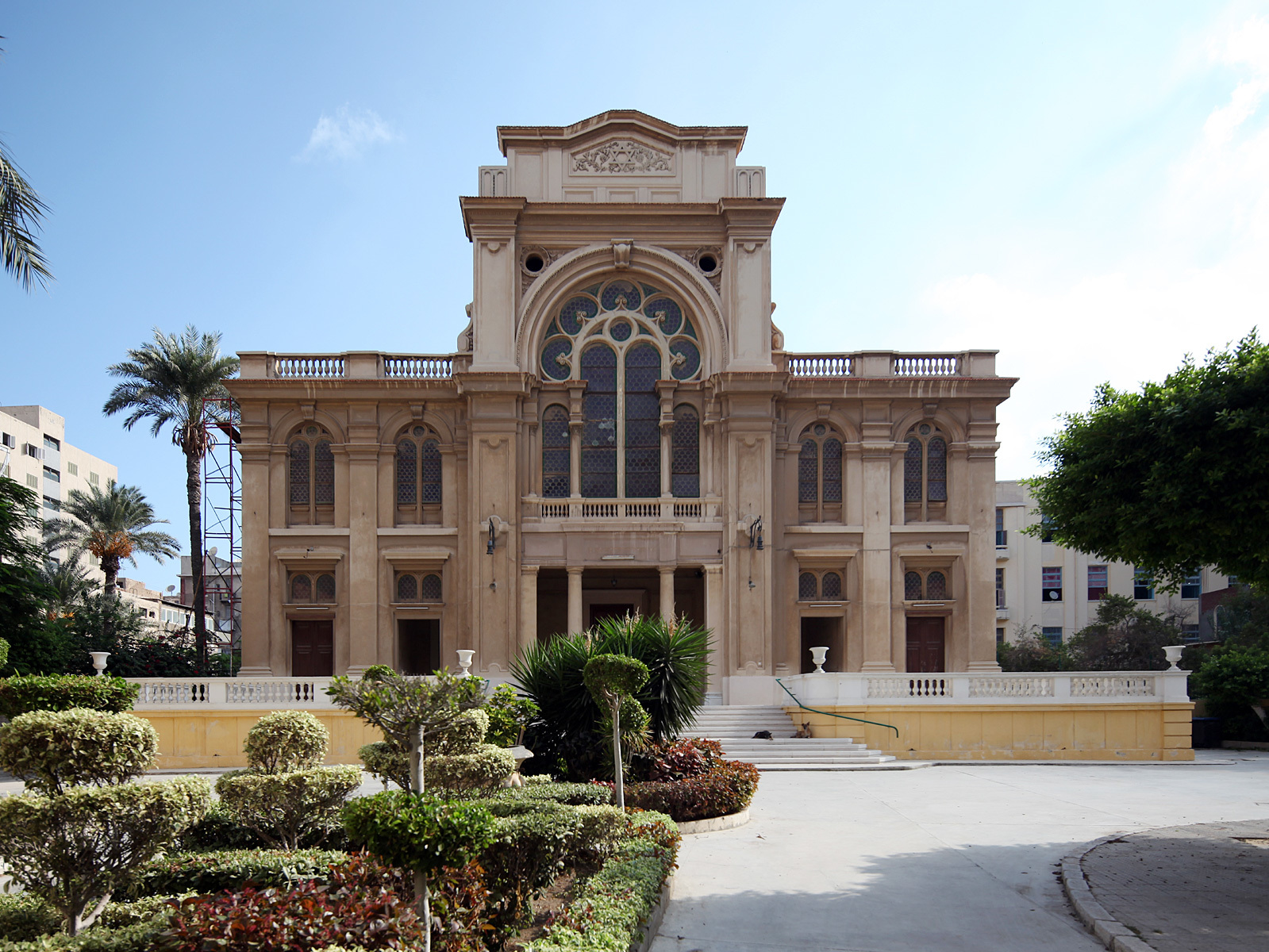
Eliyahu Hanavi Synagogue

Alexandria's Jewish community declined rapidly following the 1948 Arab–Israeli War, after which negative reactions towards Zionism among Egyptians led to Jewish residents in the city, and elsewhere in Egypt, being perceived as Zionist collaborators. Most Jewish residents of Egypt moved to the newly settled Israel, France, Brazil and other countries in the 1950s and 1960s. The community once numbered 50,000 but is now estimated at below 50. The most important synagogue in Alexandria is the Eliyahu Hanavi Synagogue.

== Sports ==
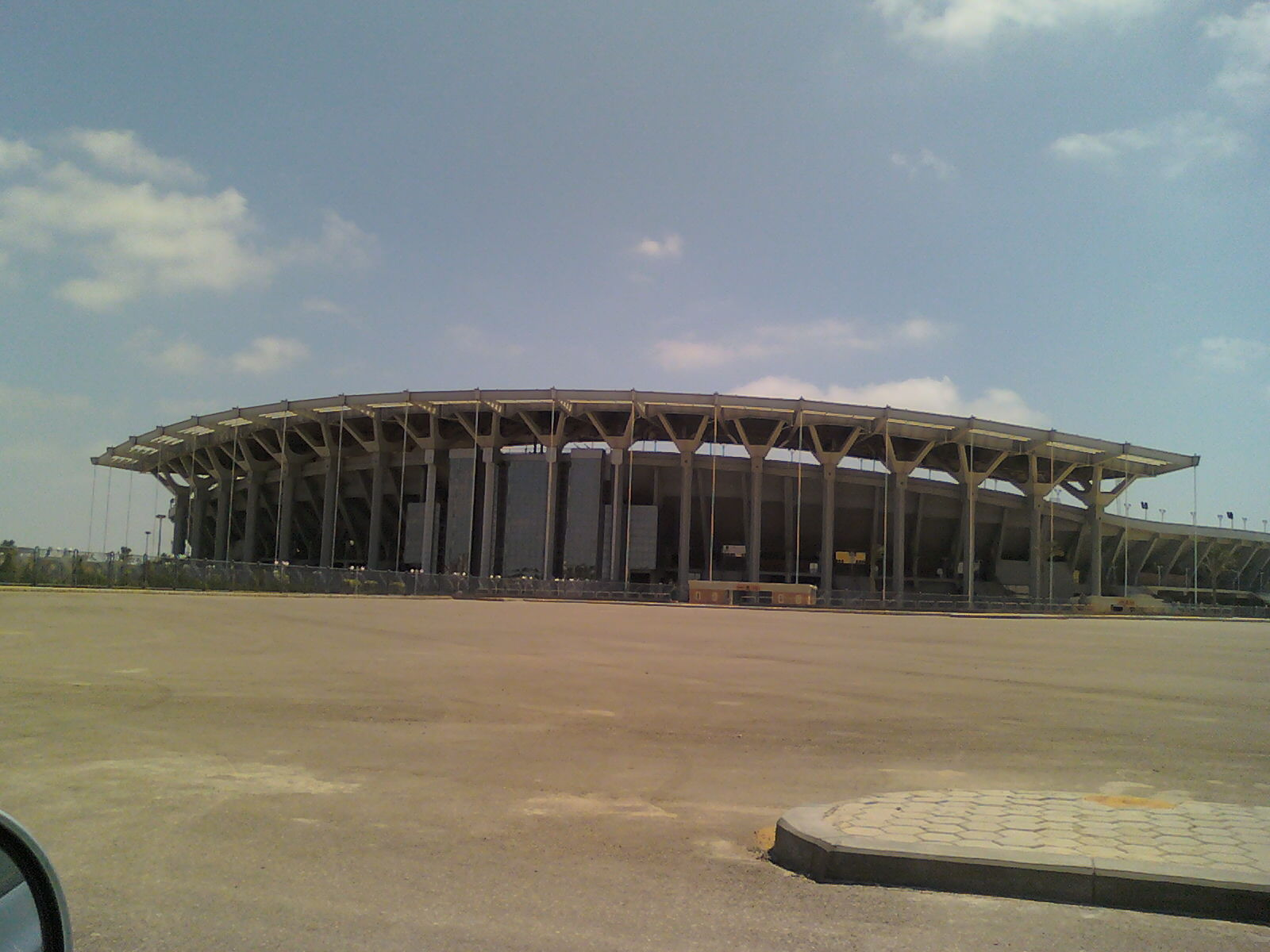
Borg El Arab Stadium

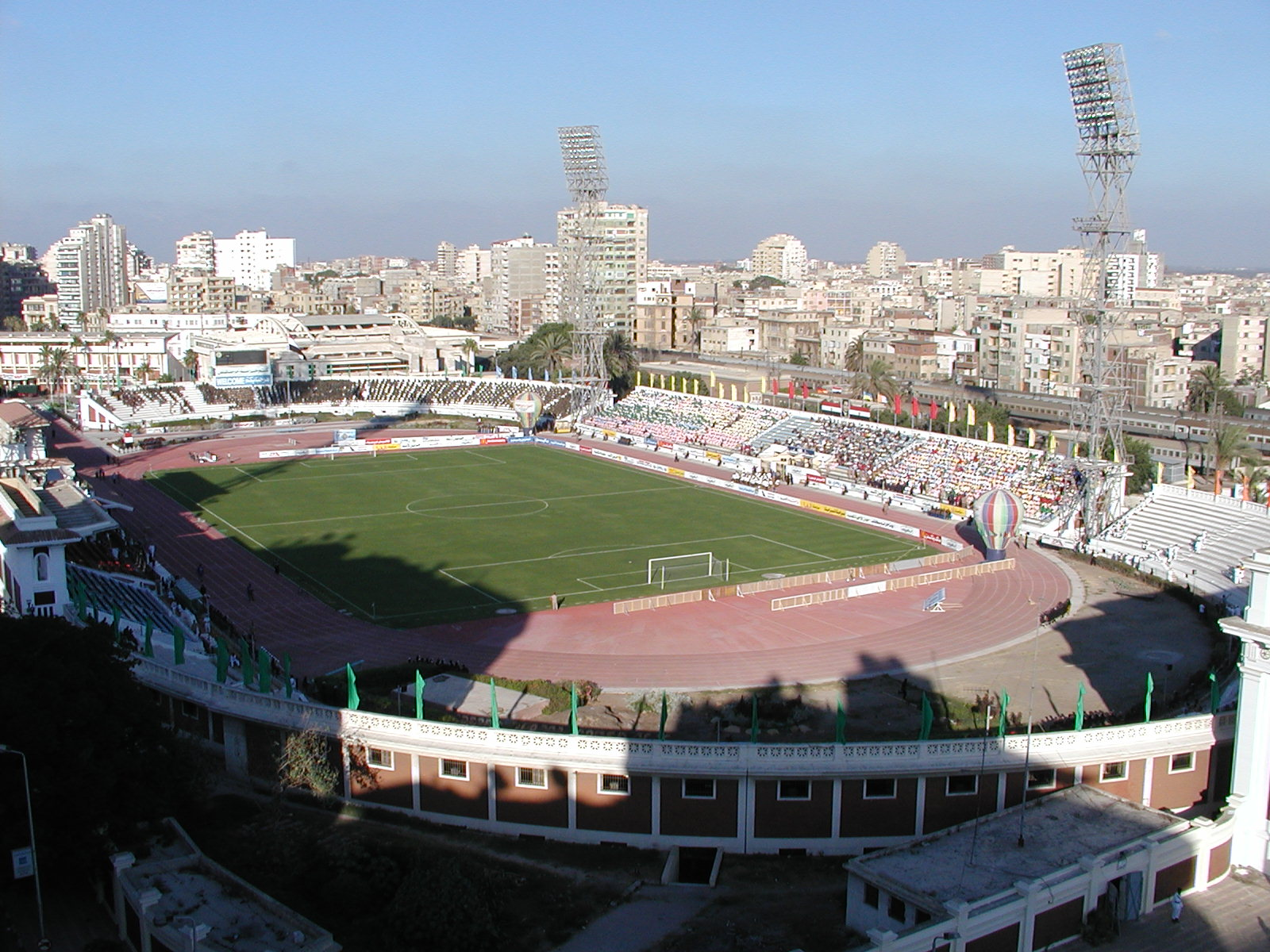
Alexandria Stadium

The main sport that interests Alexandrians is football, as is the case in the rest of Egypt and Africa. Alexandria Stadium is a multi-purpose stadium in Alexandria, Egypt. It is currently used mostly for football matches and was used for the 2006 African Cup of Nations. The stadium is the oldest stadium in Egypt, being built in 1929. The stadium holds 20,000 people. Alexandria was one of three cities that participated in hosting the African Cup of Nations in January 2006, which Egypt won. Sea sports such as surfing, jet-skiing and water polo are practiced on a lower scale. The Skateboarding culture in Egypt started in this city. The city is also home to the Alexandria Sporting Club (ASC), which is especially known for its basketball team, which traditionally provides the country's national team with key players. The city hosted the AfroBasket, the continent's most prestigious basketball tournament, on four occasions (1970, 1975, 1983, 2003).

Alexandria has four stadiums:

- Alexandria Stadium
- Borg El Arab Stadium
- El Krom Stadium
- Harras El Hodoud Stadium

Other sports like tennis and squash are usually played in private social and sports clubs, like:

- Alexandria Sporting Club – in "Sporting"
- Smouha Sporting Club – in "Smouha"
- Al Ittihad Alexandria Club
- Olympic Club
- Haras El Hodoud SC Club
- Koroum Club
- Lagoon Resort Courts
- Alexandria Country club

Alexandria is also known as the yearly starting point of Cross Egypt Challenge and a huge celebration is conducted the night before the rally starts after all the international participants arrive to the city. Cross Egypt Challenge is an international cross-country motorcycle and scooter rally conducted throughout the most difficult tracks and roads of Egypt.

== International relations ==
=== Twin towns and sister cities ===
Alexandria is twinned with:

- Almaty, Kazakhstan
- Baltimore, United States
- Bratislava, Slovakia
- Catania, Italy
- Cleveland, United States
- Constanța, Romania
- Durban, South Africa
- Incheon, South Korea
- Kazanlak, Bulgaria
- Limassol, Cyprus
- Novi Sad, Serbia
- Odesa, Ukraine
- Paphos, Cyprus
- Port Louis, Mauritius
- Saint Petersburg, Russia
- Shanghai, China
- Thessaloniki, Greece

== Notable people ==
- Ahmed Asmat Abdel-Meguid (1923–2013), Egyptian diplomat
- Soheir Bakhoum (1947–2003), Egyptian numismatist
- Camelia (1919–1950), Egyptian actress
- Constantine P. Cavafy (1863–1933), Greek poet
- Youssef Chahine (1926–2008), Egyptian filmmaker
- Ramey Dawoud, Sudanese-American rapper
- Hassan Fathy (1900–1989), Egyptian architect
- Mohamed Al-Fayed (1929–2023), Egyptian businessman
- Nagwa Fouad, Egyptian actress and dancer
- Nelly Karim, Egyptian actress
- Ahmed El Kass, Egyptian footballer
- Omar Lotfy Bey (1867–1911), Egyptian politician
- Pope Michael I of Alexandria, Egyptian patriarch
- Gamal Abdel Nasser (1918–1970), Egyptian politician, former President of Egypt
- Tewfik Saleh (1926–2013), Egyptian filmmaker
- Omar Sharif (1932–2015), Egyptian actor
- Ahmed Zaki Pasha (1867–1934), Egyptian politician

== See also ==
- Alexandria Radio
- Baucalis
- History of the Jews in Alexandria
- Cultural tourism in Egypt
- List of cities and towns in Egypt
- List of cities founded by Alexander the Great
- Of Alexandria
- Alexandria on the Indus
- Alexandrian Kings

== Notes ==
| Preceded by Sebennytos | Capital of Egypt; 331 BC – AD 641 | Succeeded by Fustat |
