= List of schools in Egypt =

This is a list of notable schools in Egypt.

== Cairo ==
- American International School in Egypt
- British International College of Cairo
- Cairo American College
- Collège de la Sainte Famille
- Collège-des-Frères
- Collège du Sacré-Coeur
- Dar El Tarbiah School
- Deutsche Evangelische Oberschule
- Deutsche Schule der Borromäerinnen Kairo
- El Zahrat Language School
- Europa-Schule Kairo
- Green Valley School
- International Italian School "Leonardo da Vinci"
- Kalousdian Armenian School
- Lycée Français du Caire
- Lycée La Liberté Héliopolis
- Malvern College Egypt
- Manarat El-Mostaqbal American School
- Manarat el Mostaqbal Language School
- Manor House School
- Misr American College
- Modern Education Schools
- New Cairo British International School
- Orouba Language School
- Ramses College
- Saint Fatima School
- St. George's College

== Giza ==
- Cairo Japanese School
- Deutsche Evangelische Oberschule
- El Alsson School
- Green Land Pré Vert International School

== 6th of October City and Sheikh Zayed City ==
- American International School in Egypt
- Beverly Hills Schools
- British International School, Cairo
- Green Land Pré Vert International School

== Alexandria ==
- The British School, Alexandria
- Collège Saint Marc
- Deutsche Schule der Borromäerinnen Alexandria
- Egyptian English Language School
- El Abbasia secondary school
- El Nasr Boys' School
- El Nasr Girls' College
- El Zahraa Language School
- Institution Sainte Jeanne-Antide
- Lycée Français d'Alexandrie
- Manar English Girls School
- New German School of Alexandria
- Schutz American School
- Victoria College

== Hurghada ==
- German School Hurghada
- Russian School Hurghada

== Kafr El-Zayat ==
- Kafr El-Zayat Secondary School For Boys

== Port Said ==
- Port Said American School
- Port Said International Schools

== Sharm El Sheikh ==
- St. Joseph Schools

== See also ==
- Education in Egypt
- List of universities in Egypt
- Lists of schools
