= Timeline of Cairo =

Coordinates: 30°3′29″N 31°13′44″E

The following is a timeline of the history of the city of Cairo, Egypt.

== Prior to 19th century ==
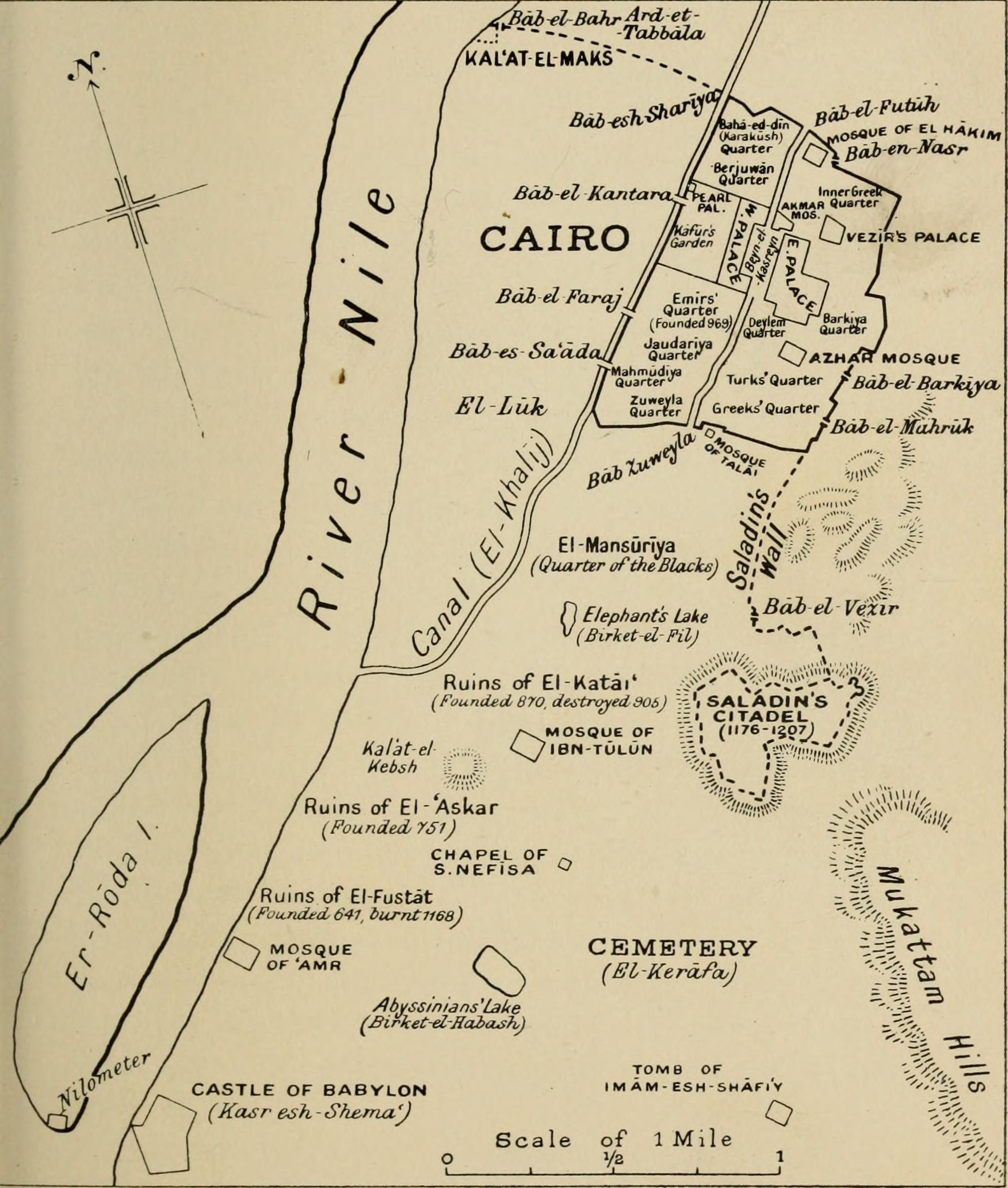
Map of Cairo, 1170.

- 1st C. BCE – Babylon Fortress built (approximate date).
- 33 CE – Origins of the Coptic Orthodox Church.
- 4th–5th C. CE – Saints Sergius and Bacchus Church (Abu Serga) built.
- 6th C. – Church of Saint Menas established.
- 642 – Mosque of Amr ibn al-As built.
- 873 – Ahmad ibn Tulun founds El-Katai.
- 879
  - Mosque of Ibn Tulun built.
  - Church of St. George built (approximate date).
  - Church of the Virgin Mary (Haret Zuweila) built (approximate date).
- 970
  - Misr al-Qahira settlement founded by Fatimid Al-Mu'izz li-Din Allah.
  - Al-Azhar University established.
- 972 – Al-Azhar Mosque established.
- 978 –The Hanging Church rebuilt (approximate date).
- 979 – Saint Mercurius Church in Coptic Cairo rebuilt (approximate date).
- 992 – Al-Hakim Mosque built.
- 11th C. – Church of the Holy Virgin (Babylon El-Darag) built.
- 1016 – Lulua Mosque built.
- 1073 – Saint Barbara Church in Coptic Cairo restored.
- 1085 – Juyushi Mosque built.
- 1092 – City wall and Gates of Cairo built (including Bab Zuweila and Bab al-Nasr).
- 1125 – Aqmar Mosque built.
- 1154 – Al-Hussein Mosque built.
- 1160 – Al-Salih Tala'i Mosque built.
- 1168 – Egypt's capital moved from Fustat to Cairo.
- 1176 – Cairo was unsuccessfully attacked in the Crusades.
- 1183 – Saladin Citadel built.
- ca.1205 – Harat el-Yahoud Synagogue rebuilt and Maimonides works there; it is rebuilt in the 19th century as the Maimonides Synagogue
- 1250 – City becomes capital of Mamluk Sultanate.
- 1280 – Qalawun complex built (approximate date).
- 1318 – Al-Nasir Muhammad Mosque built.
- 1340 – Mosque of Amir al-Maridani established.
- 1347 – Aqsunqur Mosque built.
- 1349 – Mosque of Shaykhu built.
- 1352 – Amir Taz Palace built.
- 1355 – Khanqah of Shaykhu built.
- 1359 – Mosque-Madrassa of Sultan Hassan built.

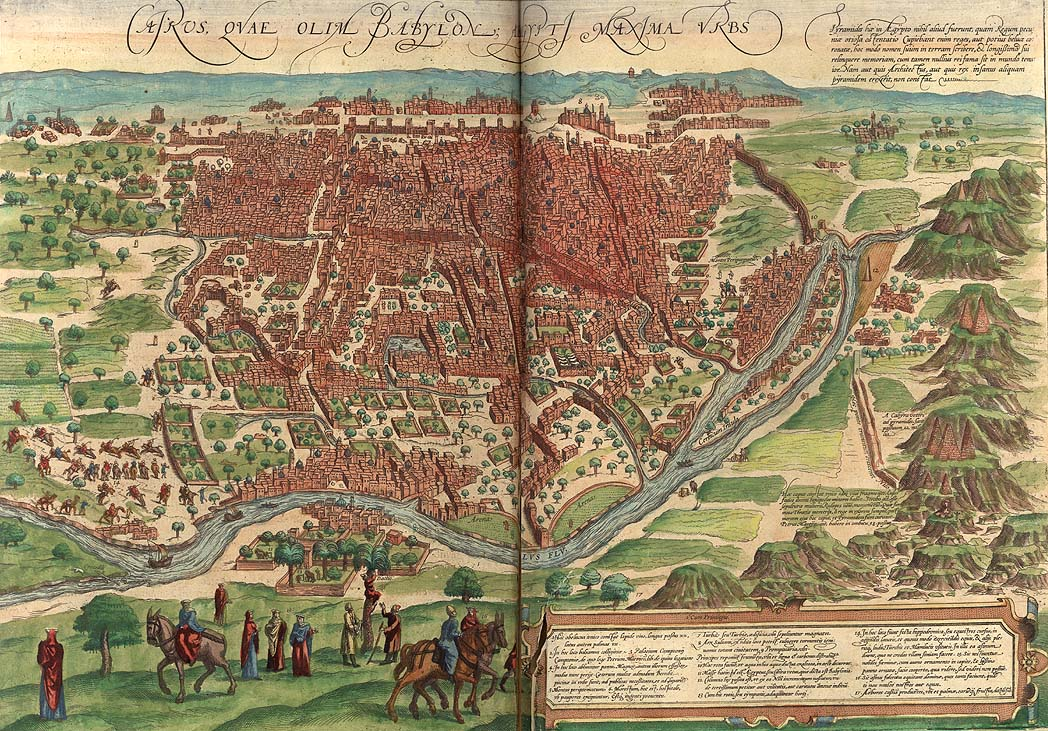
Map of Cairo, 1572

- 1421 – Mosque of Sultan al-Muayyad built.
- 1517
  - January: Battle of Ridaniya occurs near Cairo.
  - Capture of Cairo by Ottoman forces.
  - City becomes provincial capital during Selim I's rule of Ottoman Empire.
- 1774 – Mosque of Abu Dahab built.
- 1788 – Al Musafir Khana Palace built.
- 1798 – Napoleon arrives.
- 1800 – Population: 200,000 (approximate figure).

== 19th century ==
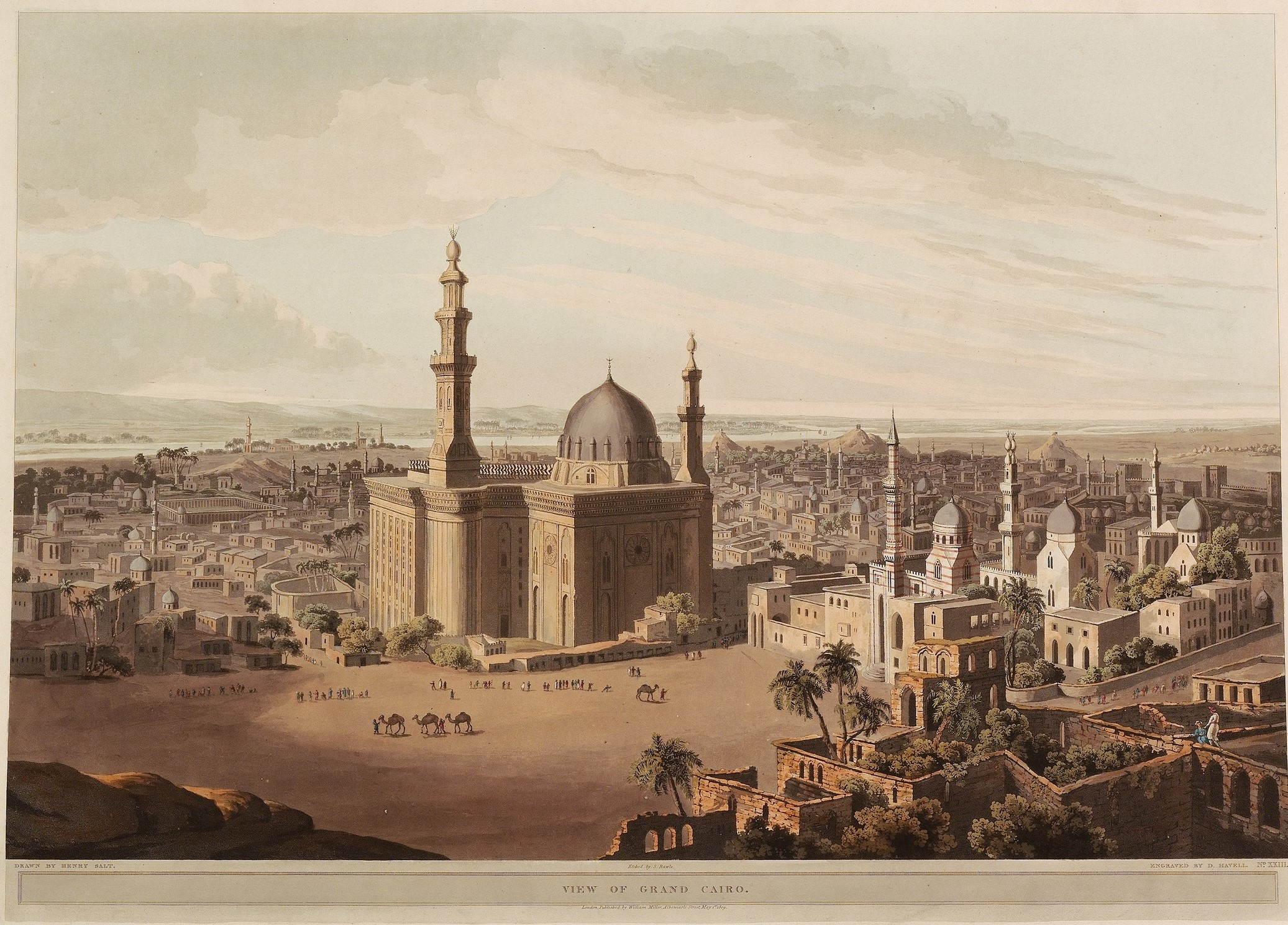
View of Greater Cairo, drawn by Henry Salt in 1805

- 1801 – June: Siege of Cairo – French surrender to British and Ottoman forces.
- 1811 – March: Massacre of the Citadel.
- 1822 – Arabic printing press in operation.
- 1827 – Kasr Al-Ainy Medical School established.
- 1828
  - Government al-Waqa'i' al-Masriyya newspaper begins publication.
  - Dar al-Mahfuzat (government archive) established.
- 1848 – Mosque of Muhammad Ali built.
- 1854 – Khorenian School begins.
- 1856 – Railway station built.
- 1863 – Museum of Egyptian antiquities founded at Bulak.
- 1860 – Shepheard's Hotel in operation.
- 1869 – Khedivial Opera House opens.
- 1870 – Egyptian National Library and Archives established.
- 1871– 24 December: Premiere of Verdi's Aida.
- 1874 – Abdeen Palace built.
- 1875 – Al-Ahram newspaper begins publication.
- 1877 – Traffic in slaves ceased.
- 1879 – Collège de la Sainte Famille founded
- 1880 – Comité de Conservation des Monuments de l'Art Arabe established.
- 1882
  - British occupation.
  - Khedivial Sporting Club founded.
  - Population: 347,838.
- 1888 – Collège des Frères (Bab al-Louq) opens.
- 1892 – Ben Ezra Synagogue built.
- 1893 – Le Progrès Egyptien newspaper begins publication.
- 1897
  - El Khalig canal filled in.
  - Population: 570,062.
- 1899
  - Sha'ar Hashamayim Synagogue built
  - Al-Ahram newspaper headquartered in Cairo.
- 1900 – Ets Hayim Synagogue (Hanan Synagogue) established
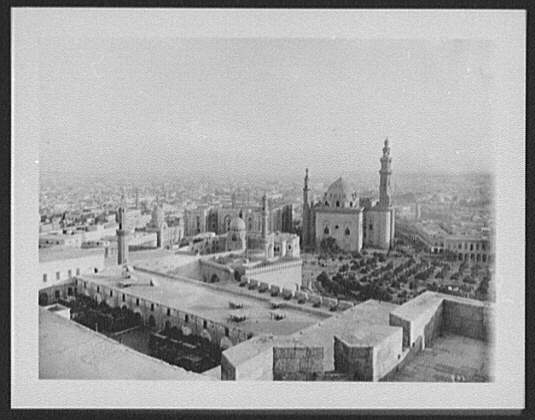
Cairo – panorama from the Citadel 1895

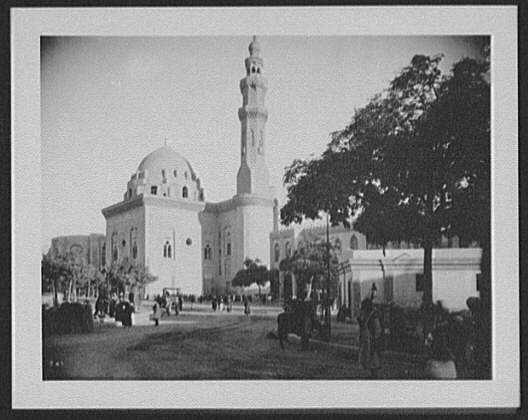
Cairo Mosque 1895

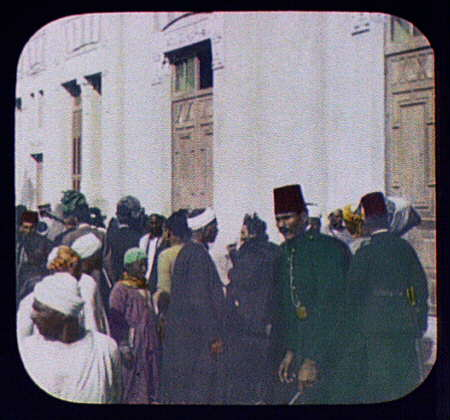
Cairo, soldiers and crowd in front of building, 1895

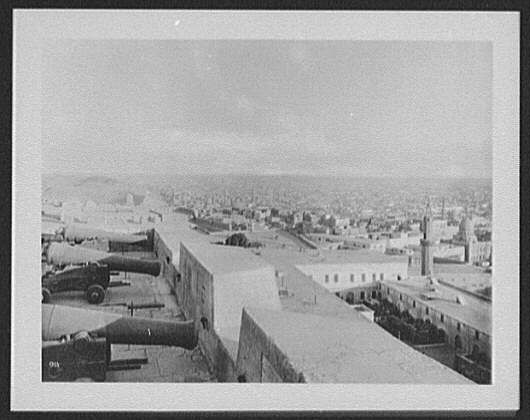
Cairo – panorama from the Citadel, 1895

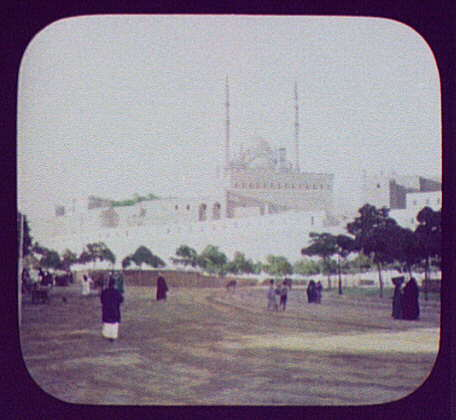
Cairo, the Citadel, 1895

== 20th century ==
=== 1900s–1940s ===
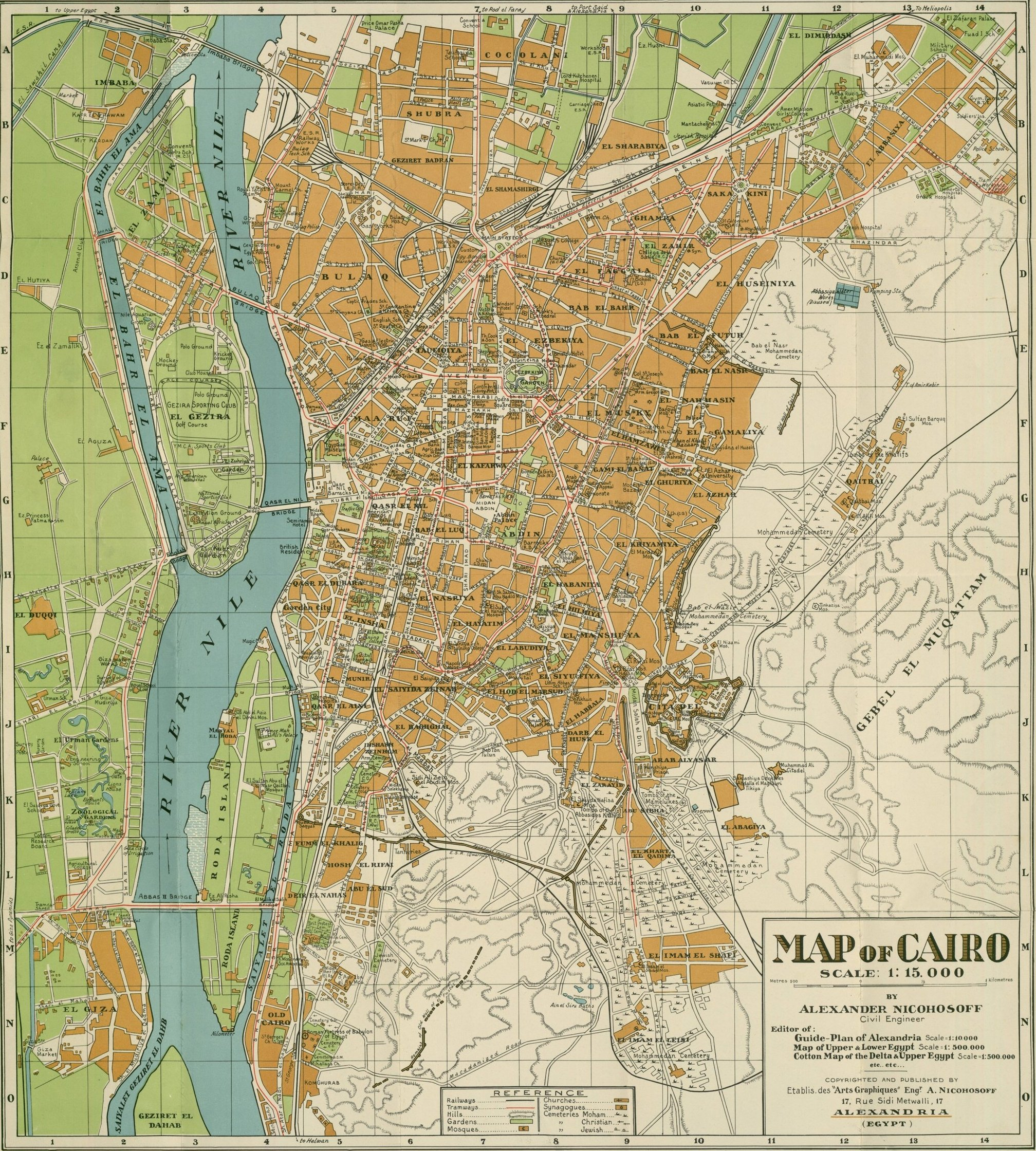
Map of Cairo, 1933

- 1902 – Museum of Egyptian antiquities moved again.
- 1905 – Chaar Hachamaim Synagogue established
- 1906 – Pathé cinema built.
- 1907
  - Al Ahly Sporting Club formed.
  - Population: 654,476.
- 1908
  - Cairo University and Café Riche opened.
  - Egyptian School of Fine Arts and American College for Girls founded.
- 1910
  - Coptic Museum built.
  - Heliopolis Palace Hotel opened.
  - Heliopolis Sporting Club founded.
- 1905 – Shimon Bar Yochai Synagogue established
- 1911
  - Zamalek Sporting Club formed.
  - Baron Empain Palace built.
- 1912
  - Boulak Bridge and Al-Rifa'i Mosque built.
- 1915
  - Arev and Housaper newspapers begin publication.
- 1919
  - Uprising against British occupation.
  - American University in Cairo established.
- 1921 – Cairo Conference held.
- 1922
  - Tutankhamun's tomb discovered.
- 1924
  - 19 November: British governor-general Stack of Anglo-Egyptian Sudan assassinated.
  - "Cairo Edition" of Quran Published
- 1925 – Pahad Itzhak (Kreim) Synagogue established
- 1929 – Manial Palace built.
- 1932
  - Society Of The Muslim Brothers headquartered in Cairo.
  - Moussa Dar'i Synagogue established
- 1933 – Qasr al-Nil Bridge built.
- 1934 – St. George's College, Cairo established.
- 1934 – Meir'enaim (Biton) Synagogue established
- 1937
  - Yacoubian Building constructed.
  - Lycée La Liberté Héliopolis opens
- 1938 – Publication of The Egyptian Gazette moves from Alexandria to Cairo.
- 1940 – Metro Cinema opens.
- 1942 – Abdeen Palace Incident.
- 1944 – Cairo Forces Parliament meeting.
  - The Arab Women's Congress of 1944 is hosted by the Egyptian Feminist Union in Cairo and the Pan-Arabian Arab Feminist Union is founded.
- 1945
  - Arab League headquartered in Cairo.
  - Ashkènazim Synagogue restored
- 1946 – Ali Baba Cinema opens.
- 1947 – Population: 2,090,654.
- 1948
  - Tchahagir newspaper begins publication.
  - Rivoli Cinema opens.
- 1949 – 12 February: Muslim leader Hassan al-Banna assassinated.

=== 1950s–1990s ===
- 1950 – Ain Shams University founded.
- 1952
  - Cairo Fire.
  - The Mogamma built.
  - Ismailia Square renamed Tahrir Square.
  - Egyptian Revolution of 1952
  - Al Akhbar starts publication.
- 1954 – Al Gomhuria newspaper begins publication.
- 1956
  - Cairo International Stadium opens.
  - City master plan created.
- 1959
  - Cairo Conservatoire opens.
  - Academy of Arts (Egypt) and Cairo Symphony Orchestra founded.
  - Arab Petroleum Congress meets in Cairo.
- 1961 – Cairo Tower built.
- 1963 – Cairo International Airport opens.
- 1964 – January: 1964 Arab League summit (Cairo) held.
- 1965 – Population: 3.3 million.
- 1966 – Cairo Opera Ballet Company founded.
- 1967 – Bab Moshé (Ibn Maimoun) Synagogue restored.
- 1968 – Saint Mark's Coptic Orthodox Cathedral built.
- 1969 – Cairo International Book Fair founded.
- 1970
  - January: Israeli forces conduct aerial attacks near Cairo.
  - September: 1970 Arab League summit held.
  - Greater Cairo Master Plan created.
- 1972 – January: Student demonstration.
- 1974 – Population: 5,715,000.
- 1975
  - January: Economic demonstration.
  - Unknown Soldier Memorial (Egypt) inaugurated.
- 1976
  - 1976 Arab League summit (Cairo).
  - Cairo International Film Festival begins.
  - British International School in Cairo established.
  - Manor House School, Cairo opens.
- 1977 – January: Economic demonstration.
- 1978 – New Cairo British International School formed.
- 1979
  - Egypt Today magazine begins publication.
  - Faisal Islamic Bank of Egypt established.
  - Sister city relationships established with Frankfurt and Stuttgart, Germany.
- 1981
  - 6 October: Assassination of Anwar Sadat.
  - Sadat Academy for Management Sciences opens.
- 1982
  - Saint Fatima School begins.
  - Sister city relationship established with New York City, United States.
- 1984
  - Master Plan for Greater Cairo approved.
  - Arab Democratic Nasserist Party founded.
- 1985
  - Child Museum opens.
  - Sister city relationship established with Paris, France.
- 1986 – February: 1986 Egyptian conscripts riot occurs.
- 1987 – Cairo Metro Line 1 begins operating.
- 1988
  - Cairo Opera House opens.
  - Sister city relationship established with Istanbul, Turkey.
- 1989
  - al-Hirafiyeen neighborhood built.
  - Sister city relationship established with Ottawa, Ontario, Canada.
- 1990
  - The American International School in Egypt opens.
  - Sister city relationship established with Beijing, China and Tokyo, Japan.
- 1991 – Al-Ahram Weekly begins publication.
- 1992
  - Earthquake.
  - Population: 6,800,000 (estimate).
- 1993
  - Asyut–Cairo highway constructed.
  - Sister city relationship established with Barcelona, Spain.
- 1995 – Dreamland development begins near city.
- 1996
  - 6th October Bridge built.
  - Cairo Metro Line 2 (Shoubra AlKheiman- AlMounieb) opened.
- 1997
  - Aldiwan Arabic Language Center opens.
  - Sister city relationship established with Xi'an, China and Seoul, South Korea.
- 1998 – Sister city relationships established with Houston, United States and Minsk, Belarus.

== 21st century ==
=== 2000s ===
- 2001
  - Misr American College established.
  - Cairo 52 arrested.
- 2003 – El Sawy culturewheel built.
- 2004
  - Al-masry Al-youm newspaper begins publication.
  - Canadian International College established.
  - Abdul Azim Wazir becomes governor of Cairo (approximate date).
- 2005
  - April 2005 Cairo terrorist attacks
  - British University in Egypt established.
  - Al-Azhar Park built.
  - El Fagr newspaper begins publication.
- 2006
  - City government website online (approximate date).
  - Al-Resalah television begins broadcasting.
- 2007
  - City hosts 11th Pan Arab Games.
  - 57357 Hospital established.
- 2008 – Youm 7 newspaper starts publication.
- 2009
  - 2009 Khan el-Khalili bombing
  - Cairo Jazz Festival begins.

=== 2010s ===
- 2010 – Population: 7,248,671.
- 2011
  - 25 January: Uprising against Mubarak regime begins.
  - April: Abdel Qawi Khalifa becomes governor of Cairo.
- 2012
  - Cairo Metro Line 3 (Imbaba / Mohandiseen – Cairo Int'l Airport) opened.
  - Heliopolis Palace incident
  - Pope Shenouda III, head of Egyptian Coptic church, died.
  - Protests against state president Mohamed Morsi.
- 2013
  - Anti-Morsi protests.
  - February: The first Iranian president, Ahmadinejad, to visit Egypt since 1979.
  - April: Violence against Coptic after funeral.
  - 3 July: 2013 Egyptian coup d'état.
  - 8 July: "Egyptian soldiers fire on Morsi supporters protesting outside a military facility in Cairo, killing over 50."
  - 14 August: "More than 600 people, mostly Morsi supporters, are killed when police clear two pro-Morsi sit-ins in Cairo."
  - Air pollution in greater Cairo reaches annual mean of 76 PM2.5 and 179 PM10, much higher than recommended.
- 2017 – Population: 9,539,673 (urban agglomeration).

=== 2020s ===
- 2021 – 2021 Cairo clothing factory fire

== See also ==
- History of Cairo
- History of Egypt
- Timeline of Egypt
- List of cities by population density
- Timelines of other cities in Egypt: Alexandria, Port Said

== Bibliography ==
=== Published in 18th–19th century ===
- Carsten Niebuhr (1792). "Of the City of Cairo". Travels through Arabia. Half-title:Niebuhr's travels through Arabia and other countries in the East. Translated by Robert Heron. Edinburgh: R. Morison and Son. hdl:2027/hvd.hxj9mv – via HathiTrust.
- C.F. Volney (1807). "De la ville du Kaire". Voyage en Egypte et en Syrie (in French). Paris: Courcier.
- H.A.S. Dearborn (1819), "Grand Cairo", A Memoir on the Commerce and Navigation of the Black Sea, Boston: Wells & Lilly
- Gardner Wilkinson (1847), "Cairo", Hand-book for Travellers in Egypt, J. Murray, OCLC 23931478
- Edward Balfour (1885). "Cairo". Cyclopaedia of India and of Eastern and Southern Asia (3rd ed.). London: B. Quaritch.
- Library, Boston Public (1893), "Egypt: Places and Cities: Cairo", Bulletin of the Public Library of the City of Boston
- Leo Africanus; John Pory (1896), "Cairo", in Robert Brown (ed.), History and Description of Africa, vol. 3, London: Hakluyt Society, OCLC 2649691

=== Published in 20th century ===
- "Cairo", Chambers's Encyclopaedia, London: W. & R. Chambers, 1901
- "Cairo", Egypt: Handbook for Travellers (5th ed.), K. Baedeker, 1902, OCLC 1384290
- Stanley Lane-Poole (1902), The Story of Cairo, London: J.M. Dent & Co., OL 7246281M
- D.S. Margoliouth (1907), Cairo, Jerusalem, and Damascus, London: Chatto & Windus, OL 23283598M
- "Cairo (Egypt)" . Encyclopædia Britannica. Vol. 4 (11th ed.). 1910. pp. 953–957.
- Benjamin Vincent (1910), "Cairo", Haydn's Dictionary of Dates (25th ed.), London: Ward, Lock & Co.
- Mrs. R.L. Devonshire (1917), Rambles in Cairo, Cairo: Sphinx Printing Press, OL 22891093M
- Gaston Wiet (1964), Cairo, city of art and commerce, US: University of Oklahoma Press, OL 5917631M
- Malise Ruthven (1980), Cairo, Great Cities, Time-Life Books, OL 7775805M
- John Flink (1996). "Cairo". In Noelle Watson (ed.). International Dictionary of Historic Places: Middle East and Africa. UK: Routledge. p. 154+. ISBN 1884964036.
- André Raymond (2000). Cairo. Harvard University Press. ISBN 0-674-00316-0.

=== Published in 21st century ===
- Julia Elyachar (2003). "Mappings of Power: The State, NGOs, and International Organizations in the Informal Economy of Cairo". Comparative Studies in Society and History. 45 (3): 571–605. JSTOR 3879462.
- "Cairo". Understanding Slums: Case Studies for the Global Report 2003. United Nations Human Settlements Programme and University College London. 2003.
- Paul Tiyambe Zeleza; Dickson Eyoh, eds. (2003). "Cairo, Egypt". Encyclopedia of Twentieth-Century African History. Routledge. ISBN 0415234794.
- Janet L. Abu-Lughod (2004). "Cairo". In Josef Gugler (ed.). World Cities beyond the West: Globalization, Development, and Inequality. Cambridge University Press. ISBN 0521830036.
- Seif El Rashidi (2004), "Chronology of Cairo", in Stefano Bianca; Philip Jodidio (eds.), Cairo: Revitalising a Historic Metropolis, Turin: Umberto Allemandi & C. for Aga Khan Trust for Culture, pp. 244–245
- Benedicte Florin (2005). "Urban Policies in Cairo: From Speeches on New Cities to the Adjustment Practices of Ordinary City Dwellers". In Abdoumaliq Simone; Abdelghani Abouhani (eds.). Urban Africa: Changing Contours of Survival in the City. London: Zed Books. ISBN 1842775936.
- Kevin Shillington, ed. (2005). "Cairo". Encyclopedia of African History. Fitzroy Dearborn. ISBN 978-1-57958-245-6.
- Omnia el Shakry (2006), "Cairo as Capital of Socialist Revolution?", in Diane Singerman; Paul Amar (eds.), Cairo Cosmopolitan: Politics, Culture, And Urban Space In The New Globalized Middle East, American Univ in Cairo Press, ISBN 9789774249280
- Clifford Edmund Bosworth, ed. (2007). "Cairo". Historic Cities of the Islamic World. Leiden: Koninklijke Brill. ISBN 9789047423836.
- Bruce E. Stanley; Michael R.T. Dumper, eds. (2008), "Cairo", Cities of the Middle East and North Africa, Santa Barbara, US: ABC-CLIO, ISBN 9781576079201
- Gabor Agoston; Bruce Alan Masters, eds. (2009). "Cairo". Encyclopedia of the Ottoman Empire. Facts on File. p. 112. ISBN 978-1-4381-1025-7.
- "Cairo". Grove Encyclopedia of Islamic Art & Architecture. Oxford University Press. 2009. p. 321+. ISBN 9780195309911.
- Gerhard Böwering, ed. (2013). "Cairo". Princeton Encyclopedia of Islamic Political Thought. Princeton University Press. p. 80. ISBN 978-0-691-13484-0.
