= El Zahraa Language School =

Coordinates: 31°14′34″N 29°58′18″E

- مدرسة الزهراء الخاصة للغات
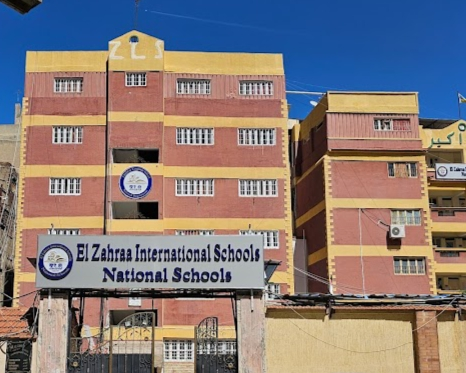
- The main building

Location
- 21 Azmi street janaklis Alexandria; Egypt

Information
- Type: Private
- Founded: 1993; 33 years ago
- Founder: Mr.Ibrahim M.Issa
- Principal: Mrs.Nashwa Samir
- Language: English
- Nickname: ZLS
- Website: https://nat.elzahraa.org/

El Zahraa Language School (Arabic: مدرسة الزهراء الخاصة للغات) is a private school located in Egypt. It is the first ACT test center in Alexandria and offers the American Diploma.

== History ==
El Zahraa Language School was established as a language school under the national educational system in 1993 by Mr.Ibrahim M.Issa. The school is located in Janakliss, Alexandria. In 2006 the school offered the American Highschool Diploma.

In 2018-2019, El Zahraa American School completed all the necessary procedures and requirements to become the first ACT test center in Alexandria, Egypt. In 2019 the school became an SAT test center.

In 2016 the school upgraded classrooms with smart boards and expanded computer labs. The facilities were improved in order to support more students.

== Curriculum ==
El Zahraa Language School is a co-educational school from Kindergarten to Grade 12, offering both the Egyptian National Curriculum and the American High School Diploma.

== Extracurricular activities ==
El Zahraa Language School organises trips for students to notable universities in Alexandria such as Pharos University. In 2018-2019, the school won the first rank among various international schools in a Tele match competition. In 2024, The school participated in Alabakera show, and won the 1st place.

== Awards and recognition ==
The school received several awards and recognition.

- 2009/10: A Certificate of Appreciation from the Social Education Department of the Educational Eastern Directorate, Alexandria.
- 2011/12: Award of Excellence in the Social Education.
- 2013-2014: The school received two certificates of appreciation for the participation in a Festival called “Alexandria the Town of Security & Tourism”
- 2014-2015: The school was awarded a Certificate of Appreciation; 4th Place in Poetry Competition at Educational Eastern Directorate, Alexandria.
- 2020-2021: The Head of English Department was awarded a certificate of approval as a member of an Advanced External Review Team.

== See also ==
- Victoria College, Alexandria
- El Nasr Boys' School
