= Manor House School =

Manor House School may refer to:

- Manor House School, Cairo, Egypt
- Manor House School, Little Bookham, England
- Manor House School, Raheny, Ireland
- The Eaton House Group of Schools § Manor House School, London, England
