= St. Joseph Schools =

School system in Egypt

St. Joseph Schools or St. Joseph's Private Language School is an international school system in Sharm El Sheikh, Egypt. It has two sections: St. Joseph's American School and St. Joseph's International School. As of 2015, the director is Amel El Maghraby.

The American school serves up to grade 12. The international school has kindergarten until secondary year 3.

== See also ==
- Education in Egypt
- List of international schools
- List of schools in Egypt
