= The British School, Alexandria =

The British School, Alexandria المدرسة البريطانية بالاسكندرية

Information
- Established: 1984
- Principal: Dawn Savage
- Age: 3 to 18
- Language: English

The British School, Alexandria (Arabic: المدرسة البريطانية بالاسكندرية) is a British international school in Roushdy, in Alexandria, Egypt. It serves students ages 3–18.

== History ==
In 1984, the school opened on the property of the British consulate and it had occupied five other locations.

As of 2015, its 433 students originated from 23 countries.

In 2019, the prep school relocated to a villa opposite the British Council offices.

In 2020, the school became an Egyptian school, taken over by Emerald (A governmental company) specialising in takeovers for the CERA group. The school has since been administered as a commercial profit making school my Eduhive, a small educational management company.

== The Prep School ==
The prep school teaches children from year 1 to year 6

== See also ==
- Education in Egypt
- List of international schools
- List of schools in Egypt
