= Manar English Girls School =

El Manar English Girls School (M.E.G.S)(Scottish school)
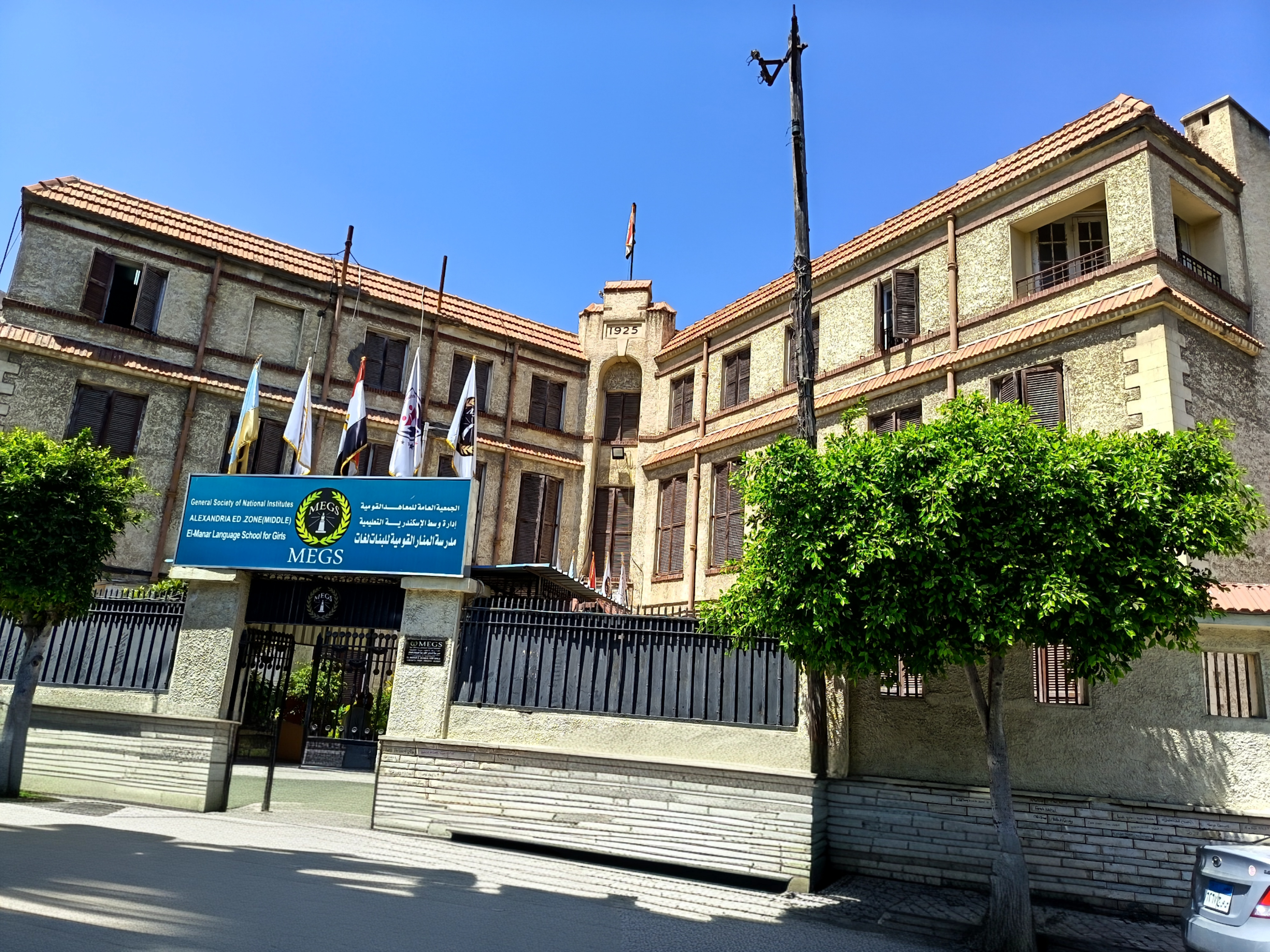
- Alexandria; Egypt

Information
- Type: Private / National Institutes
- Established: 1925
- Principal: Mrs. Noha Gafar
- Website: https://al-manar-girls.skooture.ai/

El Manar English Girls School (M.E.G.S) (Arabic: مدرسة المنار القومية للبنات لغات) is a school in El Raml Station (Mahatet El Raml), Alexandria, Egypt. It was founded in 1925 as the Scottish school in Alexandria. It includes kindergarten, primary, preparatory, and secondary sections.

The school has a theater, a gymnasium, three computer laboratories, three science laboratories, a library, two music rooms, an art room and an equipped clinic. The school has its annual bazaar and speech day. Graduates celebrate their graduation at their own Prom which is held every year. There are playgrounds for sport.

== History of the school ==
In 1968 the government founded the Cooperative Educational Institutes of National Accordance with the provisions of Law No. 317 of 1956 issuing the Cooperative Societies Act and assumed management of these schools under the supervision and control of the Ministry of Education, education. The Cooperative Association of National Institutes exercised its activities in the management of these schools until 1973.

== Staff ==
- Principal: Mrs. Noha Gafar
- Primary Department Headmistress: Mrs. Gihan Abelsalam
- Headmistress of Middle Department: Mrs. Dina El Feky
- Secondary Head of Department: Mr. Ibrahim Mamdouh

== See also ==
- List of schools in Egypt
- Educational institutions in Alexandria
- Education in Egypt
