= Malvern College Egypt =

British international school in Cairo

Location
- B2-B3 South Ring Road - Investment Zone Kattameya; Cairo; Egypt
- Coordinates: 29°58′49″N 31°20′48″E

Information
- Type: British International School, day school
- Motto: Sapiens qui prospicit (Wise is the person who looks ahead)
- Established: September 2016
- Acting Headmaster: Richard Moore
- Gender: Co-educational
- Age: 3 to 18
- Enrolment: 850
- Website: https://malverncollege.edu.eg/

Malvern College Egypt (MCE) is a British international school in Cairo, Egypt, located at B2-B3 South Ring Road. It is operated in a partnership between UK-based Malvern College and the Azazy International Group. The school opened in September 2016 with 350 students and 35 expatriate teaching staff. Malvern College Egypt offers a British curriculum, with secondary students taking the IGCSE exams, under the Edexcel syllabus, and Sixth Form students taking A-levels or the IBDP. In 2019, MCE became an IB World School, offering the Diploma Programme (IBDP).

== Opening ==
The College was formally launched in December 2014 by the former British Ambassador to Egypt, John Casson, at an event also attended by Prince Michael of Kent, members of the British Parliament’s All-Party Parliamentary Group on Egypt, former First Lady of Egypt Jehan Sadat, Egyptian actor Omar Sharif, British actress Elizabeth Hurley and former British Prime Minister Tony Blair.

== Governance ==
The founding headmaster was Duncan Grice who previously worked at Dulwich College Suzhou.

== Staff and facilities ==
The College is managed in partnership with a British independent school and has teaching staff who have exclusively attended British universities. Most lessons at MCE are taught in English, with English being the predominant language used within the College. From Nursery through to Year 12, an enhanced form of the English National Curriculum is offered. In Year 9, pupils begin the International GCSE prior to moving to the Sixth Form to study their final qualification before graduation. From September 2018, MCE has offered a full complement of A-Level courses within the school's Sixth Form. MCE applied to become a candidate school to offer the International Baccalaureate Diploma Programme (IBDP). After the two-year application process, Malvern College Egypt successfully became an IB World School. MCE began teaching IBDP courses in August 2019. The College also offers various enrichment programmes.

As of 2017, the school's facilities include libraries, science laboratories, a media centre, music studios, music practice rooms, a 25 m six-lane swimming pool, a beginners’ pool, a basketball court, a 5-a-side FIFA 2 standard all-weather pitch, a 450-seat theatre, a food technology room, art and design technology workshops, a medical centre, a coffee shop and a central piazza.

== Malvern College International Schools ==
Since opening its first international school in 2012, the Malvern College Family of Schools has continued to expand its portfolio across the world. This includes:

- Malvern College Qingdao, opened in 2012
- Malvern College Chengdu, opened in 2015
- Malvern College Egypt, opened in 2016
- Malvern College Pre-School Hong Kong, opened in 2017
- Malvern College Hong Kong, opened in 2018
- Malvern College Switzerland, opened in 2021 (Now closed permanently)

== See also ==
- List of international schools
- Lists of schools by country
- List of schools in Egypt
- New Cairo
- Maadi
