= Murder of Marwa El-Sherbini =

2009 murder in Germany of an Egyptian woman

Marwa El-Sherbini
- Born: 7 October 1978; Alexandria, Egypt
- Died: 1 July 2009 (aged 30); Dresden, Germany
- Cause of death: Stabbing
- Resting place: Alexandria, Egypt
- Occupation: Pharmacist
- Spouse: Elwy Ali Okaz
- Children: Mostafa

Marwa Ali El-Sherbini (Arabic: مروة على الشربيني), (Note: Egyptian Arabic pronunciation: [ˈmɑɾwɑ ˈʕæli (ʔe)ʃʃɪɾˈbiːni]) was an Egyptian woman and German resident who was killed in 2009 during an appeal hearing at a court of law in Dresden, Germany, when she was three months pregnant. She was stabbed by Alex Wiens, (Note: In line with common practice by the German media, Wiens is referred to as Alex W. or Alexander W. in the media in Germany. His full name became known to the international media when his identity was confirmed during the murder trial.) an ethnic German immigrant from Russia against whom she had testified in a criminal case for verbal abuse. El-Sherbini's husband, who was present at the hearing, tried to intervene. He too was repeatedly stabbed by Wiens and was then mistakenly shot and wounded by a police officer who was called to the court room. Wiens was arrested at the crime scene and subsequently tried for murder and attempted murder. He was found guilty of both charges; it was also found that Wiens's actions constituted a heinous crime, because they were committed in front of a child, against two people, in a court of law, and fulfilled the murder criterion of treacherousness, such as hatred against foreigners. Wiens was sentenced to life imprisonment.

The death of El-Sherbini immediately resulted in international reactions, with the most vocal responses coming from predominantly Muslim nations. The Egyptian public and media focused attention on the religious and racial hatred aspect of the killing, especially as the initial confrontation between the victim and perpetrator had happened because she wore an Islamic headscarf. In response to anti-German sentiments and public protests in Egypt and other countries, the German government issued a statement of condolence nine days after the incident. Wiens's trial for murder and attempted murder occurred under strict security measures and was observed by national and international media, diplomats and legal experts.

== Marwa El-Sherbini ==
Marwa El-Sherbini was born in 1978 in Alexandria, Egypt, to the chemists Ali El-Sherbini and Laila Shams. In 1995, she graduated from El Nasr Girls' College, where she had acted as a student speaker. El-Sherbini went on to study pharmacy at Alexandria University, obtaining a bachelor's degree in pharmaceutical sciences in 2000. From 1992 to 1999, she was a member of the Egypt national handball team. In 2005, El-Sherbini moved with her husband, Elwy Ali Okaz, to Bremen, Germany. In 2008, the couple and their two-year-old son moved to Dresden, where Okaz, a lecturer at Minufiya University, obtained a doctoral research position at the Max Planck Institute for Molecular Cell Biology and Genetics. El-Sherbini worked at the University Hospital Carl Gustav Carus in Dresden and at a local pharmacy as a part of an accreditation programme to practice pharmacy in Germany.

With others, El-Sherbini set up a registered voluntary association with the aim of establishing an Islamic cultural and education centre in Dresden. At the time of her death, El-Sherbini was three months pregnant, expecting her second child.

== Alex Wiens ==
Alex Wiens (Russian: Алекс Винс, also known as Alexander Wiens) was born in 1980 in Perm, Russia under the name Alexander Igorevich Neltsin. After leaving school, he completed a vocational training programme as a warehouseman. In 1999, after a medical examination for conscription, Wiens was exempted from compulsory military service in the Russian armed forces; it was stated that Wiens probably had suffered from a severe and chronic psychosis. In 2003, he immigrated to Germany and gained German citizenship as a result of his ethnic origin. In Germany, he worked as a builder and caretaker, but had been living on welfare benefits for the long-term unemployed at the time of the murder. In November 2009, at the time of sentencing, Wiens was 28 years old, unmarried and without children.

== Verbal abuse and court case for defamation ==
On 21 August 2008, Wiens and El-Sherbini met at a public playground in Dresden's Johannstadt district, where Wiens's niece and El-Sherbini's son were playing. During a quarrel over whose child should be using the playground's swing, Wiens began shouting verbal abuse at El-Sherbini. El-Sherbini who was wearing an Islamic headscarf, was called "Islamist", "terrorist" and (according to one report) "slut". (Note: The police report stated that Wiens called El-Sherbini Terroristin, Islamistin and Schlampe. (Der Spiegel, 31 August 2009, p. 65).) Other people present tried to intervene, but Wiens vehemently continued the verbal abuse for several minutes, directing epithets in Russian and German at the Russian-speaking bystanders who attempted to reason with him. El-Sherbini called the police on a bystander's mobile phone and within a few minutes four police officers arrived in two vehicles at the scene. El-Sherbini and Wiens were questioned; El-Sherbini was subsequently driven away in one of the police vehicles.

Wiens was charged with criminal defamation and given a penalty order to pay a fine of €330. (Note: A penalty order can be issued by a court in Germany, in writing without trial, as punishment for a summary offence [Ordnungswidrigkeit]. A district court on request of a public prosecutor can for instance order to pay a fine or give a suspended prison sentence of up to one year. For more information see Strafbefehlsverfahren (Germany).) After formally objecting and refusing to pay the fine, Wiens was tried at the district court of Dresden. He was found guilty by the court and fined €780 in November 2008. However, during the trial Wiens claimed mitigating circumstances for the act of insulting El-Sherbini, suggesting that "people like her" were not really human beings and therefore incapable of being insulted. The public prosecutor appealed the verdict, aiming at a custodial sentence, due to the openly xenophobic character of the incident. Wiens also appealed the verdict and was subsequently granted a court-appointed defence counsel. His counsel intended to withdraw the appeal before the scheduled hearing at the regional court, but Wiens objected to this.

== Appeal case and fatal attack in courtroom ==
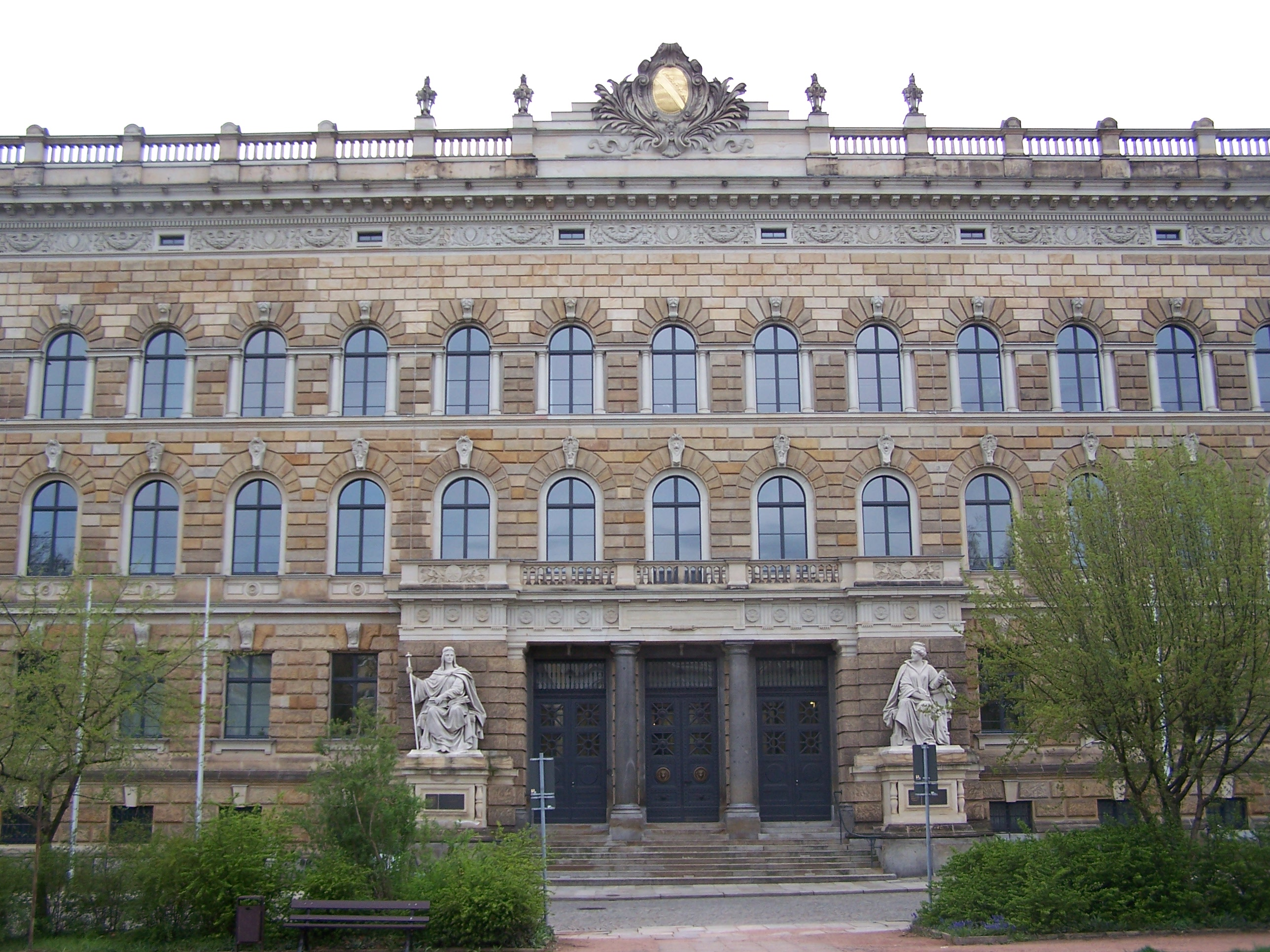
The Landgericht Dresden, the regional court where the fatal attack occurred

At the appeal hearing at the regional court in Dresden, in the morning 1 July 2009, nine people were present in the courtroom: three judges, the prosecutor, Wiens as the defendant, his court-appointed defence counsel, El-Sherbini as witness for the prosecution, and her husband and son as observers. No security personnel were present and no security searches of individuals and their possessions were carried out; this was a common procedure for cases without anticipated security concerns or detained persons present.

During the trial, the defendant Wiens appeared reserved but was noted for extreme statements. He said that Muslims were monsters to him and asked the court why they were not deported after the 9/11 attacks. He stated that German people should not mingle with foreigners and declared that he would vote for the far right National Democratic Party of Germany. The judge then requested a verbatim record, while the defence counsel tried to mediate. Wiens continued in this fashion, prompting the judge to ask whether he had ever visited a concentration camp.

Following Wiens's defence statement, El-Sherbini testified to the court. After El-Sherbini had finished her testimony, the judge asked whether there were any further questions. Wiens replied and asked why above all El-Sherbini was in Germany. The question was rejected by the judge; Wiens responded with a further question to which the defence counsel motioned for recess. El-Sherbini was not intending to wait until the end of the hearing and tried to leave. When she, her husband, and their three-year-old son were at the door, Wiens suddenly attacked El-Sherbini with a kitchen knife with an 18 cm (7.1 in) long blade, which he apparently had taken into the courtroom in a backpack. El-Sherbini received more than 15 stab wounds to the upper body and arm; the attack was carried out in such a forceful and sudden manner that it resulted in a notable absence of defence wounds. While trying to protect his wife, El-Sherbini's husband Okaz was stabbed at least 16 times to the head, neck, upper body and arm. Wiens's defence counsel tried to help El-Sherbini by obstructing Wiens with chairs and a table. The victim's three-year-old son was injured while being ushered to safety.

At 10:23, the judge raised a security alarm. Judicial officers, and a federal police officer who was in the court building testifying in an unrelated case, arrived at the scene; however, during the ongoing commotion the police officer mistook Okaz for the attacker and shot him in the upper leg. Wiens collapsed and was apprehended after one of the judges pointed out that not Okaz but Wiens was the assailant. While under arrest, Wiens resisted and begged the police officer to shoot him dead. Okaz, critically wounded in the stabbing attack, was in a coma for two days. He was subsequently treated for several weeks in a hospital near Dresden for the stabbing and shooting injuries. El-Sherbini died in the court building at 11:07, succumbing to her injuries.

== Murder trial ==
Wiens was held on remand on the suspicion of murder of El-Sherbini and attempted murder of Okaz. He was formally charged with murder, attempted murder and grievous bodily harm by the public prosecutor's office on 25 August 2009. In the indictment, prosecutors stated treacherousness and malice (based on hatred against non-Europeans and Muslims) as a motive. An application for a change of venue by Wiens's defence lawyer was refused by the upper regional court. Following a psychiatric assessment, full criminal responsibility was assumed; however, as the defendant had been diagnosed by Russian doctors to suffer from severe and chronic psychotic conditions, prosecutors requested relevant information from the Russian authorities prior to the trial. The requested documents arrived shortly before the end of the murder trial, without affecting its outcome.

The trial at the upper regional court in Dresden began on 26 October 2009. It took place under strict security precautions due to alleged death threats to Wiens. All concurrent trials were transferred to other local venues, due to the security concerns, the great interest by the national and international media, and the public. El-Sherbini's widower, brother and parents acted in the role of 'co-claimant' (Note: Under the procedural order of the German code for criminal law a victim of certain offences, or a spouse, life partner, child, sibling or parent of a homicide victim, can choose to act as a 'co-claimant' [Nebenkläger], in addition to the public prosecutor who acts as claimant during a trial. This entails certain procedural rights. For more see de:Nebenklage#Deutschland.) and were represented by eight lawyers. On the first day of the trial, the entire prosecution counsel constituted of eight lawyers from Germany, France and Egypt was present in court; (Note: In Germany anyone can give legal advice if: (i) advice is given free of charge to a person who is a member of one's family, a neighbour, or close acquaintance, or if (ii) advice is given free of charge under the supervision of a person who has certain qualifications or permissions (§ 6 RDG). Legally representing someone in a criminal trial in a court in Germany requires a relevant German legal qualification [Befähigung zum Richteramt], or a specific permission of the court in question (§ 138 StGB ).) the defendant arrived in court shrouded behind a mask, sunglasses, hat and a hood. The judge asked the defendant to remove his head attire and to confirm his name and date of birth. The defendant complied, except for removing his sunglasses, for which he was fined for contempt of court. The defence counsel motioned for the judges to be removed from the trial on the grounds of bias as they were colleagues of witnesses and worked near the crime scene. This was denied by a separate panel that had ruled on this motion.

Okaz testified on the first day of the trial. Further witnesses during the first week of the trial included an appointed medical examiner on the causes of the victim's death, the judge who had presided over the trial at the regional court on 1 July 2009, another judge (Schöffe) who had co-presided over the aforementioned trial, a social worker on the defendant's previous behaviour, the court-appointed counsel who had previously represented the defendant, a court security officer, and the judge of the defamation trial at the district court. Witnesses in the second week of the trial included people present in the original confrontation on the playground and the police officers responding to the attack on 21 August 2008. The police officer who had mistakenly shot Okaz exercised the right to remain silent during the murder trial, as a criminal investigation against him was ongoing at the time.

At the beginning of the third day of the trial, Wiens incurred a self-inflicted injury by banging his head against a table. He was diagnosed with haematomas and a suspected traumatic brain injury, but was judged fit to stand trial after a hospital-based medical examination. While continuing with noncompliant and destructive behaviour, Wiens was temporarily restrained by nine security officers in court.

The closing arguments were heard on 9 and 10 November 2009. The prosecution and the co-plaintiffs argued for a conviction for murder and attempted murder, with the legal specification "heinous crime". (Note: Besondere Schwere der Schuld (lit. particular gravity of guilt; fig. heinous crime). According to the German Criminal Code (§ 57a (1) 2 StGB) this results in a life sentence not being eligible for a parole application after 15 years. In practice, convicts serving a life sentence with this specific verdict tend to be found eligible for parole after 18 to 25 years. Parole is always conditional and subject to immediate recall until the person sentenced to life is deceased. If parole is granted, time can be spend outside prison with certain obligations for the convict.) The defence argued for a conviction for manslaughter and attempted manslaughter, by reasoning that the killing was in the heat of the moment and that the defendant may have a paranoid personality disorder. The verdict was delayed because the requested medical information from Russian authorities that arrived 9 November 2009 attested "undifferentiated schizophrenia" in 2000, thereby requiring additional testimony by a medical expert witness.

On 11 November 2009, Wiens was found guilty of the murder of El-Sherbini and the attempted murder of Okaz, and sentenced to life imprisonment. Judge Birgit Wiegand stated that the court had also found that Wiens's deeds constituted a heinous crime, because they were committed in front of a child, against two people, in a court of law, and fulfilled the murder criterion of treacherousness, such as hatred against foreigners. It meant that Wiens received the maximum sentence for this crime. Wiens appealed the conviction; however, the appeal was rejected by the Federal Court of Justice. In a decision published on 18 June 2010, the fifth criminal division of the court of justice in Leipzig stated that the appeal on points of law was unfounded and confirmed the verdict and sentence of the regional court as final matter of criminal law.

=== Redress for victim's family ===
In October 2009 in an out-of-court discussion, lawyers on behalf of El-Sherbini's family and widower approached the Ministry of Justice of the State of Saxony about compensation. In the verdict on 11 November 2009, Judge Birgit Wiegand granted the claimant's request (Adhäsionsantrag, § 406 StPO) to claim for damages against the defendant in an 'adherent case' within the remit of this criminal case. It established – without a separate trial for a private law claim – that Wiens has an obligation to compensate Okaz and El-Sherbini's beneficiaries for having harmed Okaz and killed El-Sherbini.

== Investigation of shooting of Elwy Ali Okaz ==
The shooting of El-Sherbini's husband Okaz by the federal police officer, who mistook him for the attacker, was cited by El-Sherbini's brother as indicative of racism in Germany. Following a complaint, a criminal investigation was launched against the police officer who shot Okaz. In October 2009, a criminal investigation for involuntary manslaughter and denial of assistance was launched against the judge who presided over the July trial, and against the president of the regional court. On 29 December 2009, the public prosecutor's office in Dresden announced that all investigations had been closed on 21 December 2009 without indictment, as no suspicion of a criminal offence could be substantiated. Prosecutors argued that it must have been particularly difficult to assess the situation for the intervening police officer, because when he entered the room "Elwy Okaz and Alex Wiens were both covered in blood and Elwy Okaz had just managed to grab the handle of the knife with his hand, making it appear as though he was the attacker". There were further assessment difficulties because "the actual attacker—Wiens—was holding the blade of the knife, which added to the impression that he was the one being attacked". The prosecutors' conclusion was that shooting of Okaz was a tragic mistake. In January 2010, a lawyer acting for El-Sherbini's family filed a complaint against the prosecutors' decisions to close the investigations against the police officer, the judge presiding in the 1 July 2009 trial and the regional court president.

== German media and public reaction to the crime ==
=== Initial media reports ===
The killing was reported on 1 July 2009 in German radio and television and in print media on the following day. In line with common practice regarding reporting in the German media about crime and legal proceedings, El-Sherbini was referred to as "32 [sic]-year old" witness in a Deutschlandfunk report broadcast on 1 July, without any mention to the victim's ethnic or religious background. The Minister of Justice for Saxony, Geert Mackenroth, who had visited the crime scene on the same day, publicly expressed his "deep compassion for the victim's family, for the victim herself". Another politician called for an investigation and the Association of Judges in Saxony (Sächsischer Richterbund) demanded a review of security procedures in court buildings.

Writing in The Guardian, Anja Seeliger commented that "the German media initially reported on the case at the back page", and only in the light of the vociferous protests by thousands of Egyptians in Cairo, "the German federal government, which had kept silent for nearly a week, issued words of sorrow."

=== Response by Jewish and Muslim organisations ===
The General Secretaries of Germany's Muslim and Jewish Councils visited El-Sherbini's husband in hospital on 6 July 2009. Stephan Kramer, General Secretary of the Central Council of Jews in Germany stated: "You don't have to be Muslim to oppose anti-Muslim behavior, and you don't have to be Jewish to oppose anti-Semitism. We must stand together against such inhumanity." Kramer later wrote "... as a Jew I know that anyone who attacks a person because of their race, nationality or religion is not only attacking the minority, they are attacking democratic society as a whole." He also deplored the "largely unchecked hate propaganda against Muslims".

The Central Council of Muslims in Germany suggested that the death of El-Sherbini was a result of a growing "Islamophobia", evident in many Internet discussion boards. They called upon Muslims not to instrumentalise the woman's death. A local Islamic association in Dresden stated that their planned centre for cultural exchange will be named after El-Sherbini, to promote mutual understanding between Muslims and non-Muslims.

=== Public commemoration ===
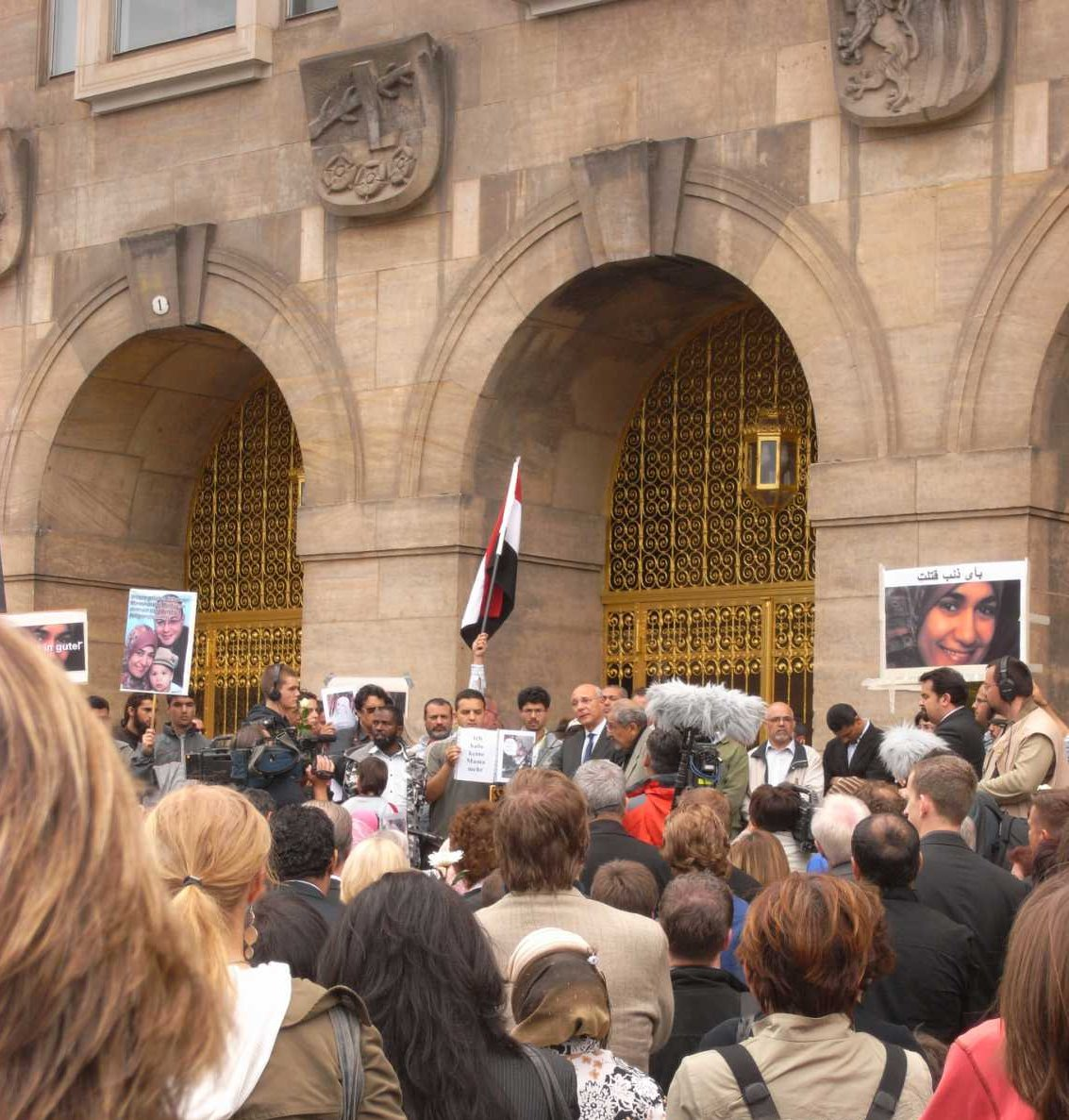
Commemorative ceremony for Marwa El-Sherbini in front of Dresden City Hall, July 2009

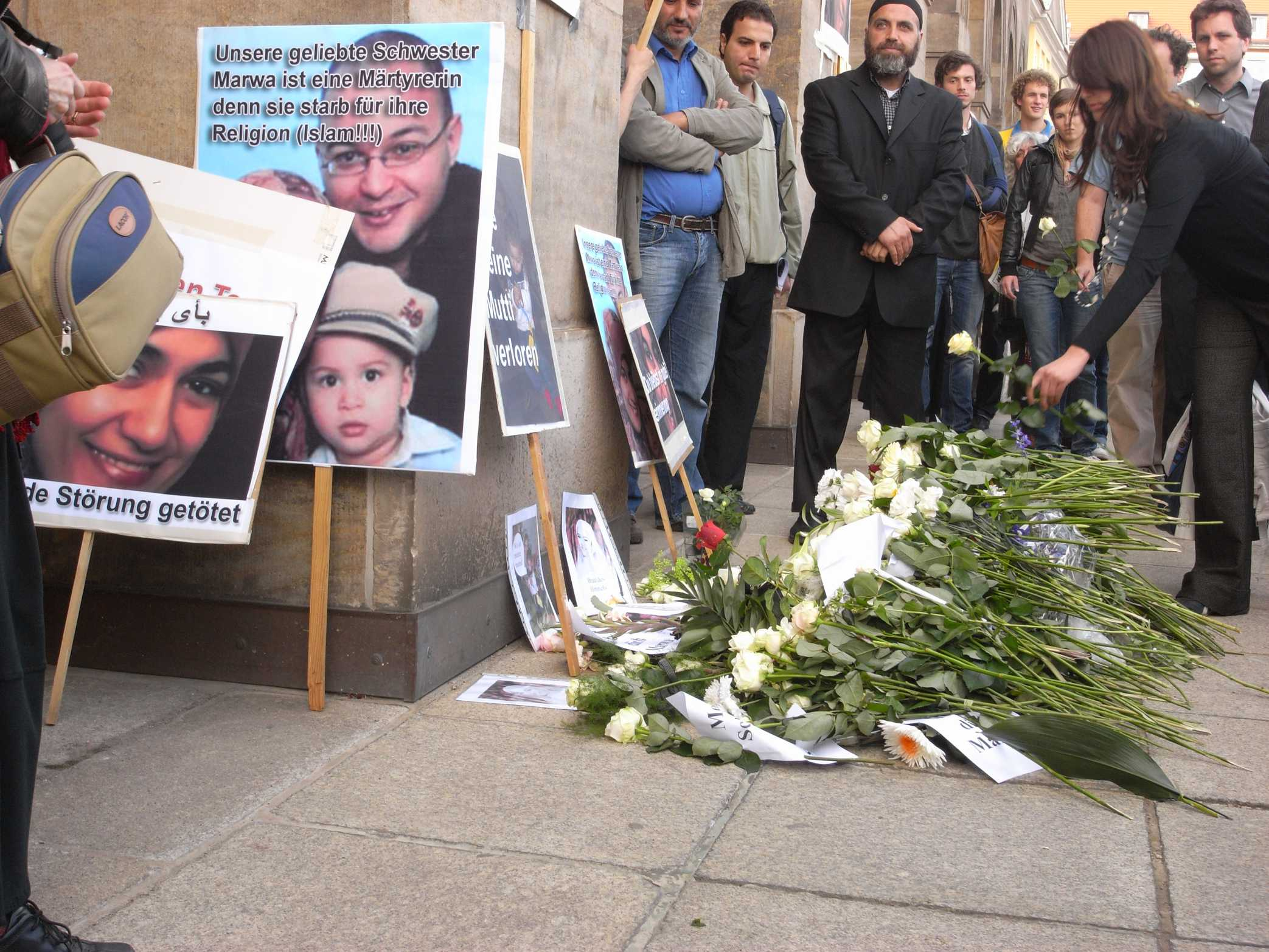
Flowers and placards at the commemorative ceremony for Marwa El-Sherbini in Dresden, July 2009

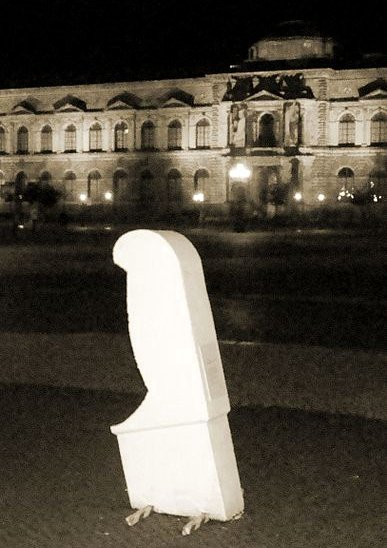
Memorial art installation "Eighteen knife stabs" July 2010, Theaterplatz (Dresden)

On 6 July 2009, about 2,000 Muslims of the Egyptian community and other nationalities in Germany held funeral prayers for El-Sherbini, in Dar Al-Salam Mosque, in Berlin. Five days later a public memorial was organized by civil rights groups in Dresden; it was attended by more than 1,000 people, including the Egyptian ambassador and officials from the state of Saxony; white roses and photos of El-Sherbini and her family were placed outside Dresden City Hall. About the same time, the Max Planck Institute for Molecular Cell Biology and Genetics, where El-Sherbini's husband researches, issued a statement on the occasion of the official ceremony, expressing shock and sympathy. This was preceded by the Max Planck Society having strongly condemned the attack on 8 July, by stating: "The fact that the attack was racially motivated is especially distressing to us, considering that the Max Planck Society is a scientific research organisation with staff members from the most various nations."

In December 2009, the Ministry of Justice in Saxony announced plans to commemorated the death of El-Sherbini with a memorial plaque in the regional court building. This plaque will state both in German and Arabic language: "[Marwa El-Sherbini] She fell victim to Islamophobia and xenophobia. With dignity and commendable moral courage she withstood this." (Note: Sie wurde Opfer von Islamfeindlichkeit und Fremdenhass. Sie ist dem mit Würde und vorbildlicher Zivilcourage entgegengetreten.)

In July 2010, one year after the murder, an association of local citizens organised a memorial art installation across Dresden, to commemorate the loss of life caused by the heinous crime and as a symbol against racism in everyday life. Eighteen concrete stelae in form of knives were temporary displayed in different public places, to represent the eighteen knife stab wounds that were inflicted on the victim. Some of the stelae were vandalised during the display.

In October 2012, a scholarship in memory of Marwa El-Sherbini was awarded for the first time. It is jointly funded by the city administration of Dresden and the state government of Saxony. The Marwa El-Sherbini Stipendium für Weltoffenheit und Toleranz (Note: Marwa El-Sherbini Scholarship for Open-mindedness and Tolerance) aims at developing future leaders who support freedom, democracy, and human rights. It is awarded to postgraduate students enrolled at an institution of higher education in Dresden.

== International reactions to killing ==
El-Sherbini's death caused considerable public and media attention in Egypt, accompanied by strong anti-German sentiments. Egypt's Prosecutor General Abdel Meguid Mahmud announced that a prosecutor from Alexandria was to be dispatched to Germany to assist in the investigation, and the Egyptian Pharmacists' Association called for a boycott of German drugs. At El-Sherbini's funeral in Alexandria, mourners referred to her as "a 'martyr' of the head scarf" and accused Germany of "racism" and "Islamophobia." Mourners carried banners criticising both German and Egyptian authorities' reactions to the crime. Egyptian police temporarily cordoned off the German embassy in Cairo to protect it from angry protesters. In response to the anti-German sentiments and public protests in Egypt and elsewhere, the German government eventually issued a statement of condolence. Some Egyptian commentators took a reconciling approach. Writing in the opinion section of Al-Ahram Weekly, Abdel-Moneim Said called on those who mourn for Marwa El-Sherbini "not [to fall] into the same morass of bigotry and hatred that killed her," but to "create Arab-Muslim-European fronts, together with other faiths, to stand up against fanaticism, bigotry and discrimination on both sides."

Iranian President Mahmoud Ahmadinejad blamed the German government for El-Sherbini's murder and called for international condemnation of Germany. In a letter to UN Secretary General Ban Ki-moon, Ahmadinejad demanded firm action against Germany and stated that "there is a strong view that the crime was a pre-planned attempt engineered by the judicial system and security forces". Iran also issued a postage stamp featuring El-Sherbini, which Press TV reported was banned in Egypt. Al-Wafd an Egyptian newspaper accused Iran of exploiting the killing of El-Sherbini to turn Muslims and Arabs against Europe and the US.

== Media reactions to murder trial ==
Interviewed by Deutschlandfunk radio, Al Jazeera correspondent to Germany Aktham Suliman said that their viewers watched the trial closely, because they were disaffected by the initial reaction in Germany to the killing. He also noted that the perceptions of a speculated verdict of not guilty by reason of insanity differed vastly between Al Jazeera and Deutschlandfunk audiences. Accordingly, the former tend to apprehend such a verdict as an absence of punishment in terms of criminal justice, whereas the latter tend to be discerned with containment away from public life through being involuntarily committed to a forensic psychiatry institution. Media scientist Hanan Badr commented on reporting in Germany and Egypt as being "a prime example of mass-media miscommunication between cultures".
