= Institution Sainte Jeanne-Antide =

Coordinates: 31°12′30″N 29°55′6″E

Location
- 1, Rue Platon, Chatby, Alexandria, Egypt; Alexandria; Egypt

Information
- Established: 1934
- Gender: girls
- Enrollment: approx. 1,000
- Language: French

Institution Sainte Jeanne-Antide is a French Catholic school for girls, located in Alexandria, Egypt built in 1934 by the sisters of Charity of Saint Jeanne-Antide Thouret.

== History ==
The "Catholic Greek Welfare Society" wanted to occupy girls in a workhouse. The first two sisters arrived in 1909 and in 1913 they established an orphanage.

In 1934, the Sisters of Charity, from Besançon, built the Holy Institution Jeanne-Antide.

== Demographics ==
Today, the school comprises more than 1000 students from pre-kindergarten to High school.
