= El Zahrat Language School =

- الزهرات التجريبية للغات
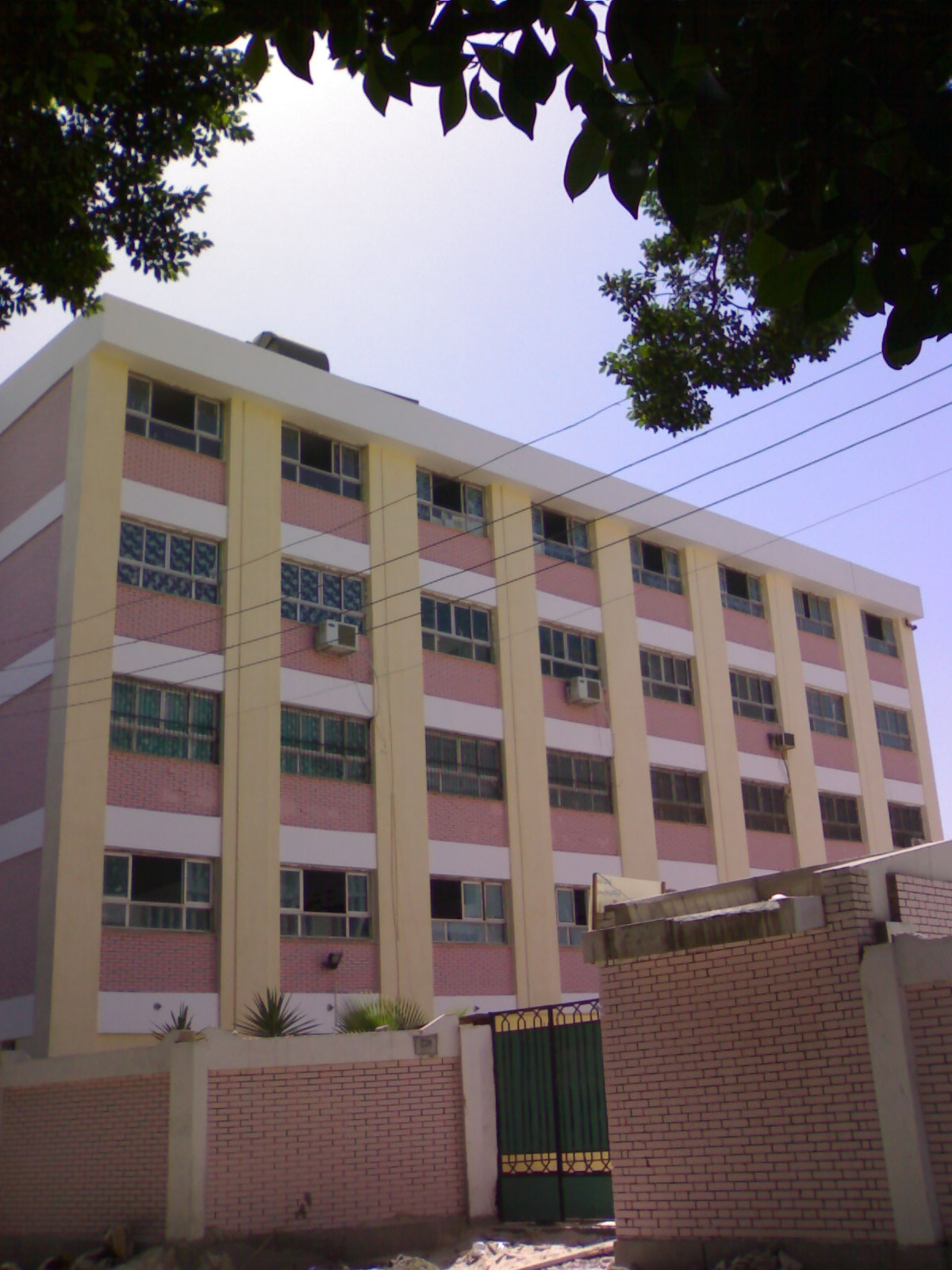
- Heliopolis; Cairo; Egypt

Information
- Language: English
- Nickname: ZLS

El Zahrat Language School (Z.L.S) is a government funded school in Heliopolis-(El Korba), Cairo, Egypt. Which offers Thanwya Amma in English and it is a co-educational primary, preparatory & secondary school. it also offers kindergarten (K.G). On 6 November 2014 the government changed the name of the school to Al Shahid Mohamed Ahmed Lotfy Alashry.
