= Lycée Français d'Alexandrie =

School in Alexandria, Egypt

Lycée français d' alexandrie, Alexandria
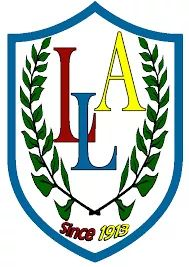

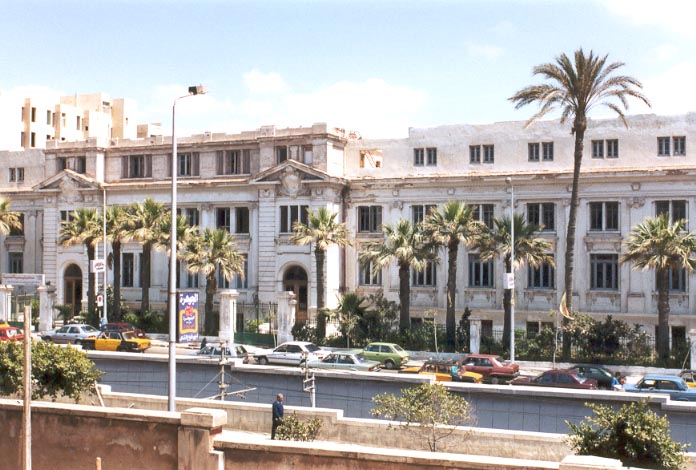

Location
- Alexandria; Egypt
- Coordinates: 31.2087°N 29.9152°E

Information
- Established: 1909
- Age: 3 to 18
- Enrollment: 826 (2025)
- Language: French
- Website: https://sites.google.com/mlfmonde.org/lfalex/accueil_1

The Lycée Français d'Alexandrie is a French international school in Chatby, Alexandria, Egypt. The Mission Laïque Française operates the school, which as of 2025 has 826 students. It serves ages 3 to 18, until the lycée (sixth form/senior high school) level.
