= El Abbasia secondary school =

- المدرسة العباسية الثانوية

Location
- Green St., Moharam Bek; Alexandria; Egypt

Information
- School type: Public School
- Established: 1910
- Founder: Abbas II of Egypt
- Language: Arabic

El Abbasia secondary school (Arabic: المدرسة العباسية الثانوية) is one of the oldest schools in Alexandria that was founded by Khedive Abbas II in 1910.

== History ==
El Abbasia secondary school is located at 11 Green Street, Moharram Bek, Alexandria. The idea for the School was proposed in 1906 by Khedive Abbas II, and construction began shortly after. The school was completed in 1910 and officially opened in 1911.

Initially, the school was located where the Faculty of Science currently stands. The Ministry of Education named the school after the Khedive in honor of its establishment during his reign, and it was called "Abbasia Secondary School." Its first location was at the Faculty of Science, which is part of "Farouk I University," now Alexandria University, in the Maharram Bey district.

The school then moved to its current building in 1942. To this day, Abbasia Secondary School is considered one of the top Public schools in Alexandria, admitting the highest-scoring students.

== Notable alumni ==
- Yousry El-Gamal, former minister of Education.
- Ahmed Badawi, former Minister of Defence of Egypt.
