= Dar El Tarbiah School =

Coordinates: 30°03′19″N 31°12′36″E

Dar El Tarbiah School Arabic: مدرسة دار التربية
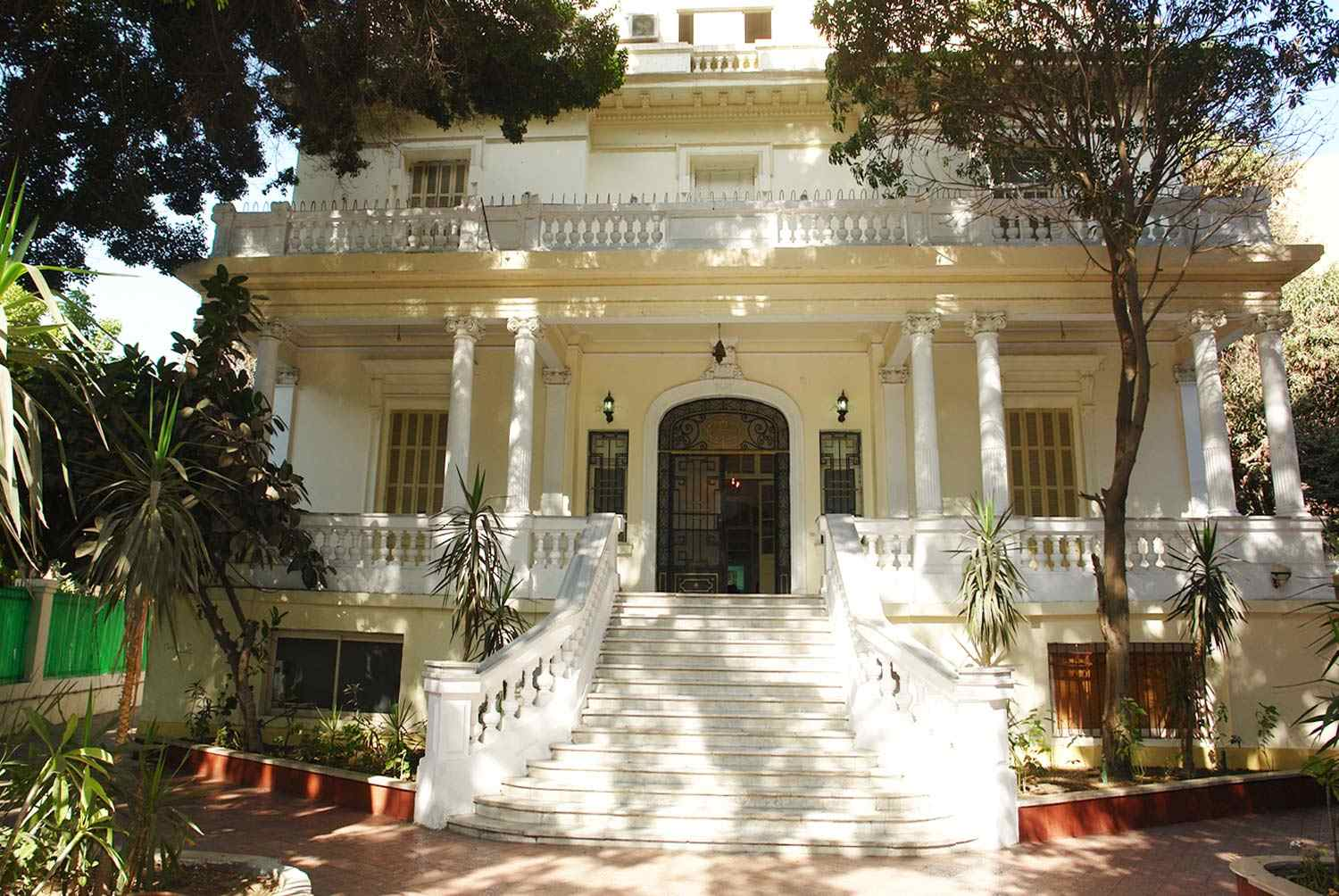

Information
- Established: 1958; 67 years ago
- Founder: Dr. Nawal El Degwi
- Grades: K-12
- Language: English

Dar El Tarbiah School (In Arabic:مدرسة دار التربية) is an Egyptian educational institution founded in 1958 by Dr. Nawal El Degwi. Dar El Tarbiah was the first English-language instruction medium institution founded by Egyptians. It provides education in the Kindergarten and Grades 1 to 12 (In the Kindergarten and Grades 1 to 6, the school is called 'Baby Home School'). The institution currently includes seven schools in Cairo and is one of the first educational institutions in Egypt. It has national, international, American and I.G.C.S.E.(British) sections.

== I.G.C.S.E. (British) section ==
=== Agouza ===
Dar elTarbiah I.G.C.S.E. Agouza was established in 1990 with grades 10 to 12. In 2007, Pre-IGCSE (usually shortened to Pre-IG) classes were opened for admission.

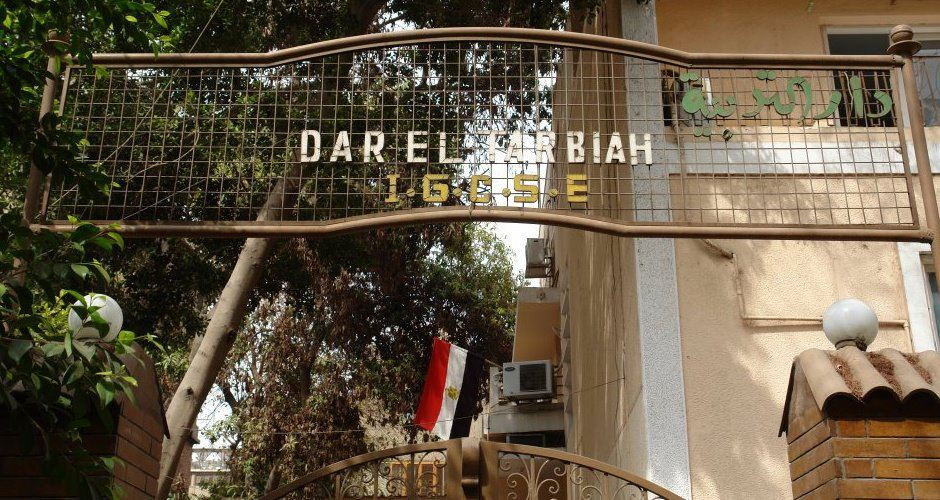
Dar El Tarbiah School IGCSE section, Agouza
