= Manarat El-Mostaqbal American School =

- مدرسة منارة المستقبل الأمريكية

Location
- Ring Road, opposite Maadi City Center; Mokattam; Cairo; Egypt

Information
- Established: 2008
- Grades: Pre-Kindergarten through Grade 12
- Slogan: Lighting the way to future success
- Accreditation: Northwest Accreditation

Manarat El-Mostaqbal American School is a private coeducational day school offering an American curriculum for Pre-Kindergarten through Grade 12 launched in the academic year 2008 – 2009. It has been given the Northwest accreditation initially in 2007.
