= Pharaonic Village =

Museum in Giza, Egypt

- القرية الفرعونية
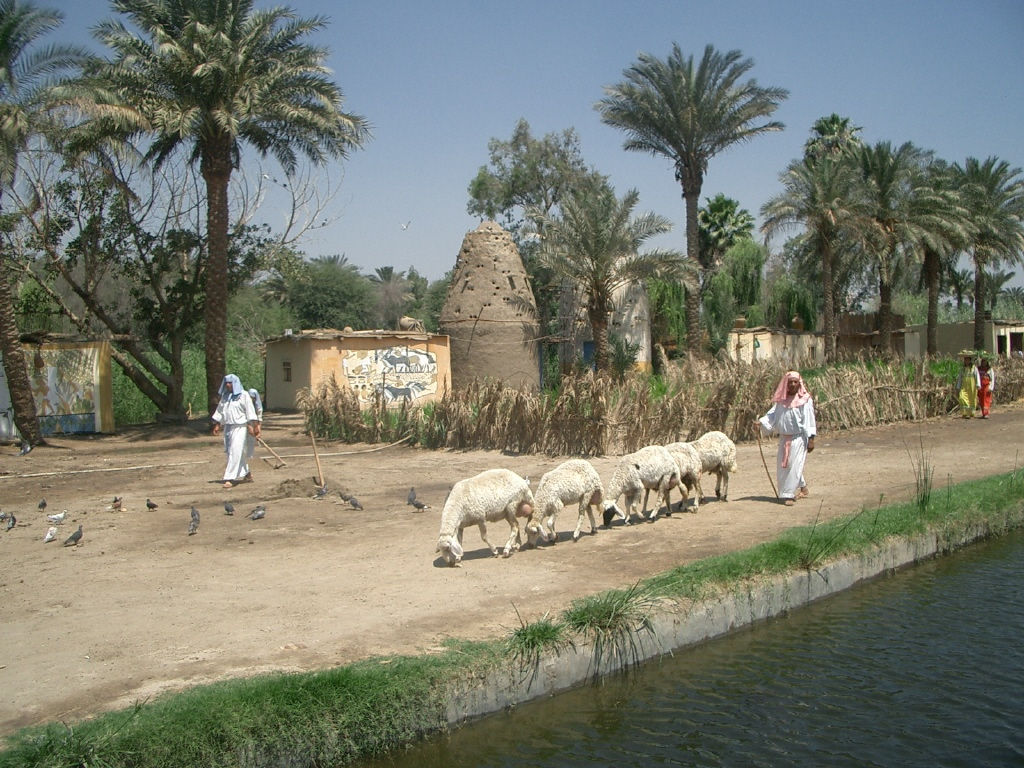
- Pharaonic Village
- Established: 1984
- Location: Giza, Egypt
- Coordinates: 29°59′50″N 31°12′55″E
- Founder: Hassan Ragab
- Website: Pharaonic Village

The Pharaonic Village is a living museum located in Giza, Egypt that exhibits ancient Egyptian life.

== History ==
The museum was founded by Hassan Ragab who envisioned a living museum where people would wear costumes and reenact ancient Egyptian life. In 1974, Ragab chose Jacob's Island as the location He planted 5,000 trees which included willow, sycamore, and date palms around the village to block out view of modern Cairo.

The nobleman's house and garden were built, along with a market, a large field for farming and harvesting, a boat-making area, roads, and farms. At the center, a massive white-stone temple was erected, later becoming the village's emblem. In 1984, Ragab officially opened the Pharaonic Village after a decade of work, at a cost exceeding six million Egyptian pounds.

In 1989, Abdel Salam Ragab joined his father in managing the village. He emphasized that the village was still evolving. Years after its opening, a replica of King Tutankhamun's tomb was unveiled.

Additionally, there are 12 museums covering different periods of Egypt's history.

== Description ==
The Pharaonic Village aims to bring ancient Egyptian history to life. Upon entering, visitors encounter actors in Pharaonic costumes reenacting daily activities such as making papyrus, fishing, painting, sculpting, farming, and mummification.

There is a floating reception hall and a small cafeteria and a shop selling Pharaonic-style artifacts. The upper floor features the Cleopatra Museum, where a guide explains Cleopatra's reign, her relationship with Julius Caesar, and the conflicts of that era.

After the Cleopatra Museum, the main tour with a boat ride that travels through the village's waterways. Along the way, visitors learn about ancient Egyptian gods, see a reenactment of the story of Moses, and gain insights into papyrus-making, mummification techniques, pottery, glassmaking, weapons crafting, and traditional agriculture, irrigation, and fishing methods. Hieroglyphic writing and ancient art are also demonstrated through live performances.

== Museums in the Pharaonic Village ==
There is a collection of specialized museums, which cover various historical periods of Egypt. These include:

- The Ptolemaic Museum
- The Heritage Museum
- The Tomb of Tutankhamun
- The Beliefs Museum
- The Boats Museum
- The Islamic Museum
- The Museum of President Mohamed Naguib (Egypt's first president)
- The Museums of Presidents Gamal Abdel Nasser and Anwar Sadat
- The Pyramids Museum
- The Coptic Museum
- The Mummification Museum
- The Modern Egypt Museum
- The Napoleon Museum
- The Cleopatra Museum

== Gamal Abdel Nasser Museum ==
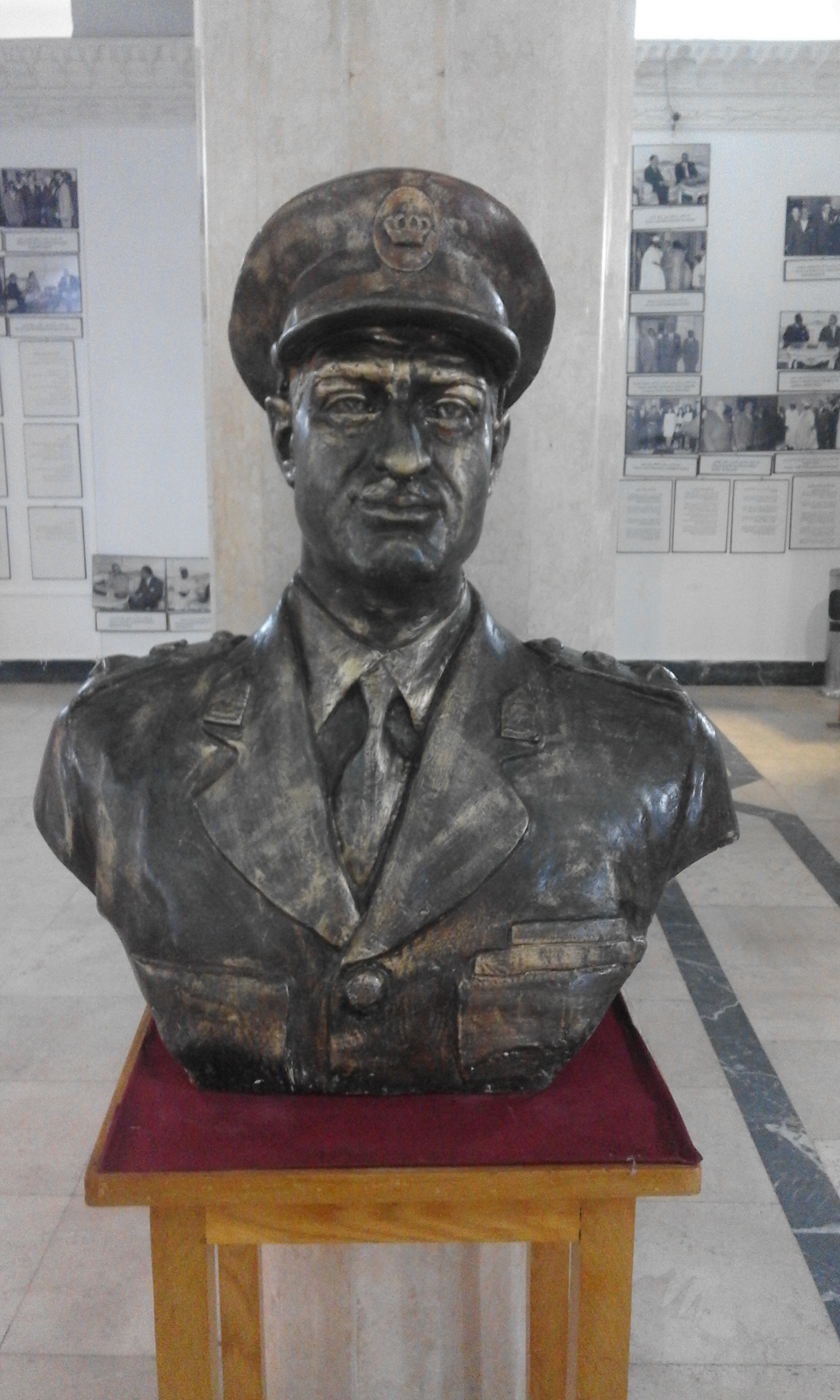
The statue of Gamal Abdel Nasser in his museum

The Gamal Abdel Nasser Museum highlights the life of the late Egyptian president from birth to his passing in the early 1970s. Located along the Nile within the Pharaonic Village, the museum houses over 170 rare photographs of Nasser at various stages of his life. It also displays a large collection of his personal belongings, including bust statues, commemorative coins, postage stamps, magazine covers featuring Nasser, and letters he wrote in 1941 and 1942. Additionally, the museum features the official decree for the nationalization of the Suez Canal (July 26, 1956), his resignation speech (June 9, 1956), and the medical report on his death.

== Anwar Sadat Museum ==
The Anwar Sadat Museum showcases an extensive collection of the former president's personal belongings, photos, and memorabilia. Some items were donated by his wife, Jehan Sadat, including his naval uniform worn at the Suez Canal inauguration, his famous walking cane, personal grooming items, and perfume. Rare photographs capture moments from his personal life, such as family pictures and images of him praying and reflecting. A model inside the museum illustrates the difficulties faced by the Egyptian army during the October War, including the Bar Lev Line and the sand barrier. The museum also displays pictures of Sadat with global leaders during the signing of the historic Camp David Accords.

== Mummification Museum ==
This museum displays models demonstrating the ancient process of mummification, as well as the deities associated with the practice. The Pyramids Museum, on the other hand, explores pyramid construction techniques and the tools used to build them.

== Replica of Tutankhamun’s Tomb ==
The village features a full-scale replica of Tutankhamun's tomb, built to the exact dimensions and layout of the original in the Valley of the Kings. It contains detailed replicas of all the artifacts found in the tomb, arranged in the same manner as they were discovered.

== Village souvenirs ==
There is a market and bazaar, where visitors can purchase a wide range of Pharaonic-inspired products, such as glassware, perfumes, copper and leather goods, sand art, henna designs, and traditional crafts. The studio offers themed photography sessions, though taking pictures inside the bazaar and studio is restricted.
