= Kafr El-Zayat Secondary School For Boys =

Coordinates: 30.829160°N 30.812917°E

Kafr El-Zayat Secondary School For Boys Arabic: مدرسة كفر الزيات الثانوية بنين

Location
- Kafr Az-Zayyat, Gharbia Governorate; Egypt

Information
- School type: Secondary school
- Gender: Boys

Kafr El-Zayat Secondary School For Boys (Arabic: مدرسة كفر الزيات الثانوية بنين) is one of the biggest high schools in the markaz of Kafr El-Zayat, in Gharbia Governorate, Egypt.
