= Victoria College, Alexandria =

Victoria College

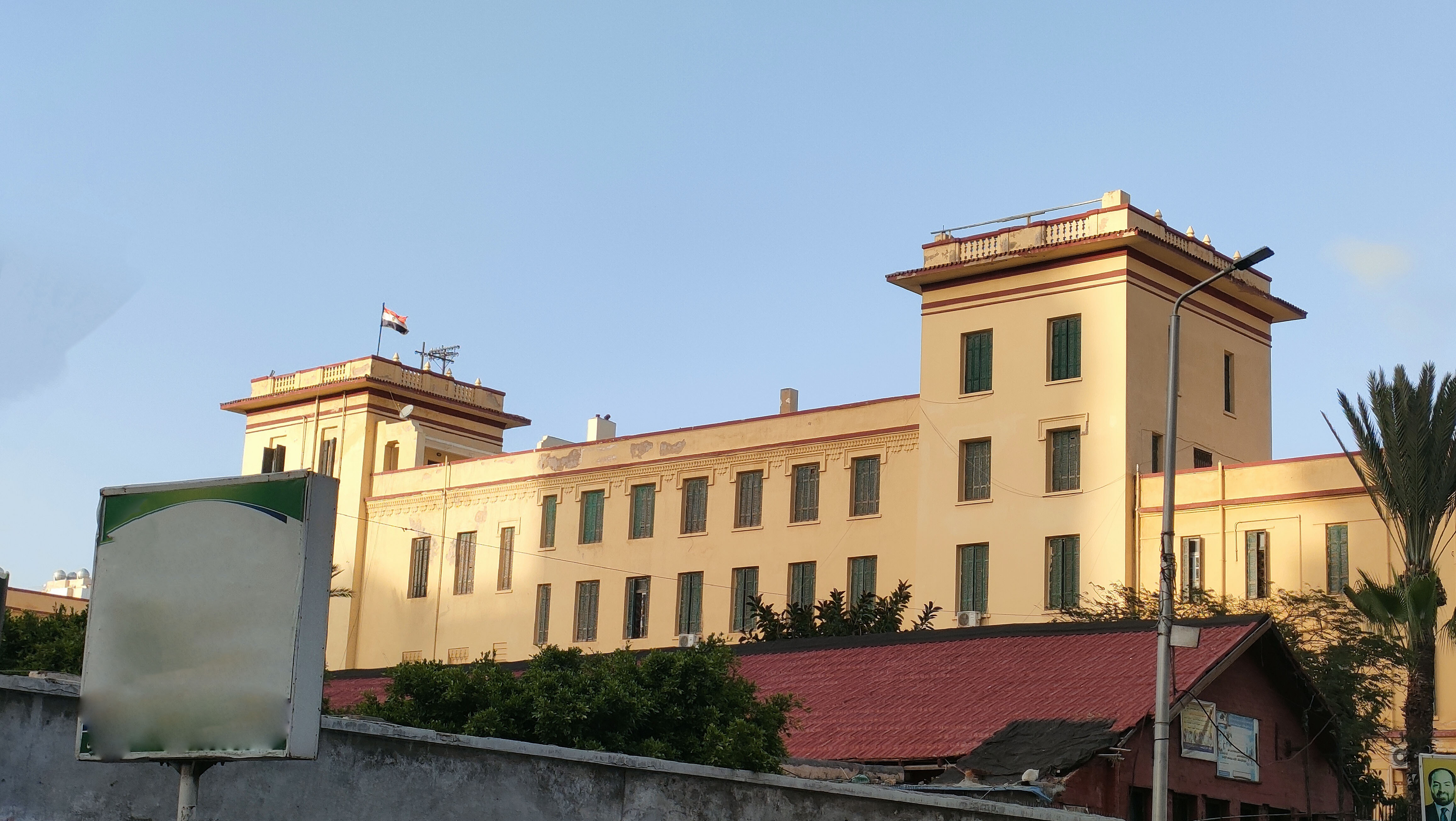
- (2024)

Location
- Alexandria; Egypt; 31.2486°N 29.9785°E

Information
- Type: Private; Under the supervision of the Ministry of Education
- Motto: Cuncti Gens Una Sumus (We Are All One People)
- Established: 1902 (124 years ago)
- Director: Saif Ahmed
- Language: English
- Campus: Urban
- Colors: Blue, golden
- Newspaper: The Victorian

Victoria College, Alexandria, (Arabic: كلية فيكتوريا) is an Egyptian private school, operating under the supervision of Ministry of Education, located in the city of Alexandria, Egypt. It was founded in 1902.

The school was founded under the impetus of the recently ennobled Evelyn Baring, 1st Earl of Cromer, of the Barings Bank, that was heavily invested in Egyptian stability. For years the British consul-general was ex officio on the board of Victoria College. The new college was to raise the standard of imperial education and free it from the influences of the madrassas and the ubiquitous Jesuits, both of whom made the British foreign office uneasy. Among prominent subscribers to the project were members of the prominent internationalized Jewish and Maltese minority in Egypt including members of the Egyptian royal family. Prior to the 1930s establishment of Baghdad College, members of the upper class of Iraq sent their children to Victoria College.

== History ==
During World War II, many displaced European royals and nobles were added to the student body:

" As the situation worsened north of the Mediterranean, scions of European monarchies expanded the student body further so that Romanovs, Saxe-Coburgs, Hohenzollerns, Zogos and Glucksburgs rubbed shoulders with the Hashemites, Mahdis and al-Sharifs. While most were treated like regular students some stood out because of restrictions imposed upon them. The Albanian royals, the Zogos, for instance, were constantly trailed by massive bodyguards, which is perhaps why they did not last long at Victoria. Years later, many among the Arab elite students would meet again this time as major players in rising petrodollar economies." (Samir Raafat)

The British imperial-outpost phase of Victoria College ended abruptly in 1956, the year that began with the dissolution of Anglo-Egyptian cooperation and saw the Suez Crisis in October. The entire British faculty was fired, including then headmaster Herbert Barritt. The school was renamed later to "Victory College" and continues to operate until this day.

At Victoria College on El Iqbal Street, former Bulgarian king and prime minister Simeon Saxe-Coburg-Gotha attended classes along with schoolmates such as King Hussein of Jordan, Zaid Al Rifai, the exiled prince of the Ottoman dynasty Osman Osmanoglu, the Kashoggi brothers (whose father was one of Saudi King Abdulaziz's physicians), Kamal Adham (who ran the Saudi external intelligence directorate under King Faisal), scholar Edward Said, present-day Saudi businessmen Mohammed Al Attas, Ambassador Mohamed Faqi and Ambassador Fouad Faqi.Shobokshi brothers and Ghassan Shaker —Internationally famous director Youssef Chahine, and actor Omar Sharif and many princes from the Libyan royal family and the Jordanian royal family.

== Notable alumni ==
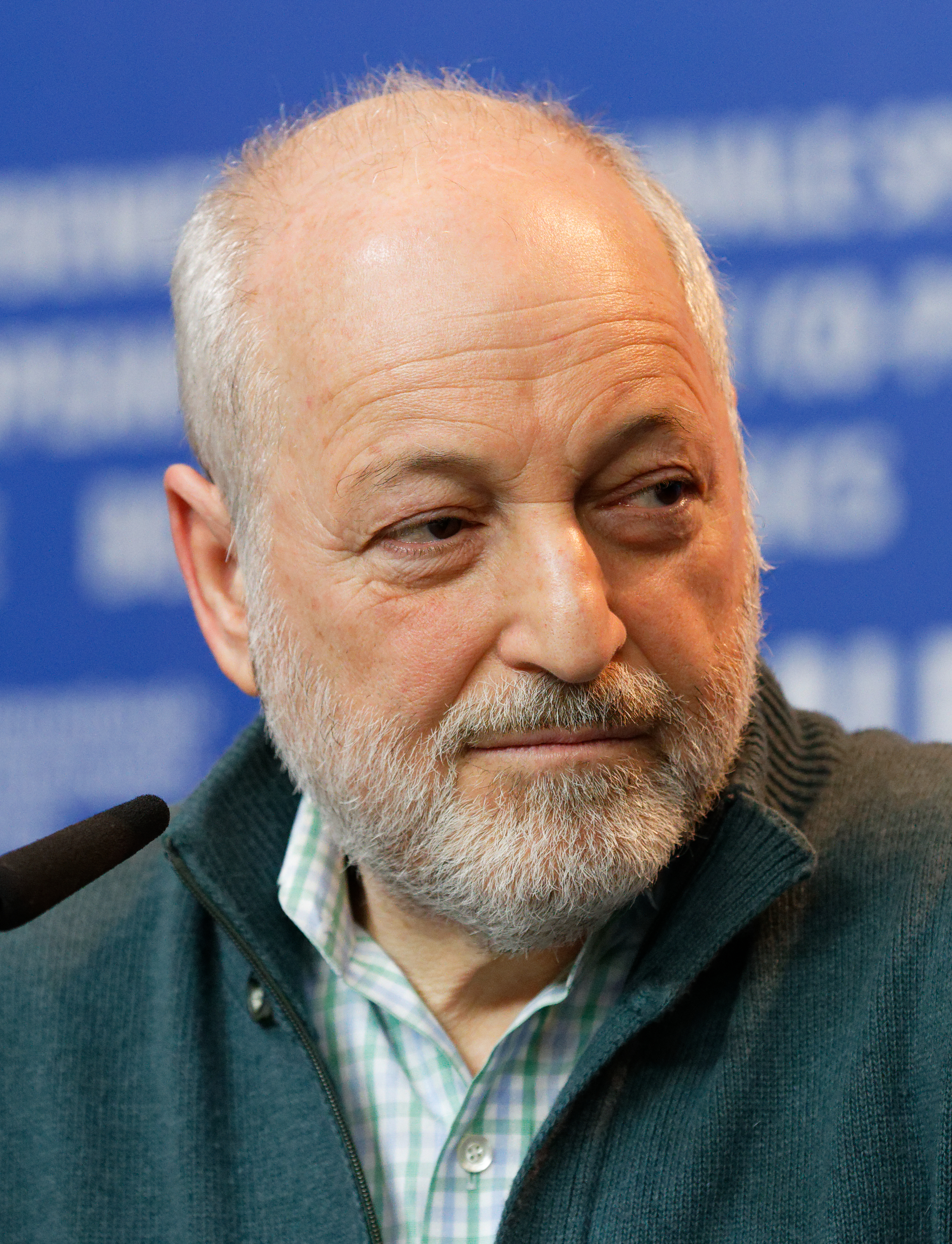
André Aciman

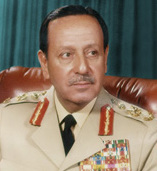
Zeid bin Shaker

- Abd al-Ilah – Crown Prince of Iraq
- André Aciman
- George Antonius
- Edward Atiyah
- Michael Francis Atiyah
- Patrick Atiyah
- Mamoun Beheiry – first president of the African Development Bank
- Gilbert de Botton
- Youssef Chahine – Egyptian film director
- Jani Christou
- Wafik El-Deiry – physician-scientist
- Foulath Hadid
- Hussein I of Jordan
- Charles Issawi
- Sayed Khadr
- Adnan Khashoggi
- Jassem Al-Kharafi
- Leka, Crown Prince of Albania
- Sadiq al-Mahdi – twice-elected prime minister of Sudan
- Abdullah Al-Nafisi
- Osman Selaheddin Osmanoğlu
- Adnan Pachachi
- Ahmed Ramzy – Egyptian actor
- Ramzy Ezzeldin Ramzy
- Zaid Rifai
- Edward Said – public intellectual; wrote Orientalism
- Omar Sharif – Egyptian actor
- Sammy Sheik
- Simeon II of Bulgaria
- Ra'ad bin Zeid
- Zeid bin Shaker
- Shadi Abdel salam

== See also ==
- Education in Egypt
- List of schools in Egypt
