= Egyptian English Language School =

Egyptian English Language School (EELS)

Location
- Alexandria; Egypt; 31°15′45″N 30°1′40″E

Information
- Type: Private School
- Established: 2002
- Grades: play school - 12
- Gender: Co-educational
- Language: English, Arabic and French
- Website: eelsschools.com

Egyptian English Language School (EELS) is a private school in Alexandria, Egypt. It was founded in 2002 and offers national education, IGCSE and American Diploma.
