= Manarat el Mostaqbal Language School =

Location
- (Egypt) Cairo; Egypt; 29°59′15″N 31°19′4″E

Information
- Type: Private
- Chairman: Omama Al Shawy
- Principal: Mohammad Fuad Rasheed
- Grades: K-12, includes the Egyptian national system and an accredited American system. In addition to the implementation of the Montessori educational system.
- Gender: Co-educational
- Language: Arabic, English, French & German

Manarat el Mostaqbal Language School is a school located in Moqattam, Cairo, Egypt.
