= Shatby =

Place in Alexandria, Egypt

Shatby الشاطبي
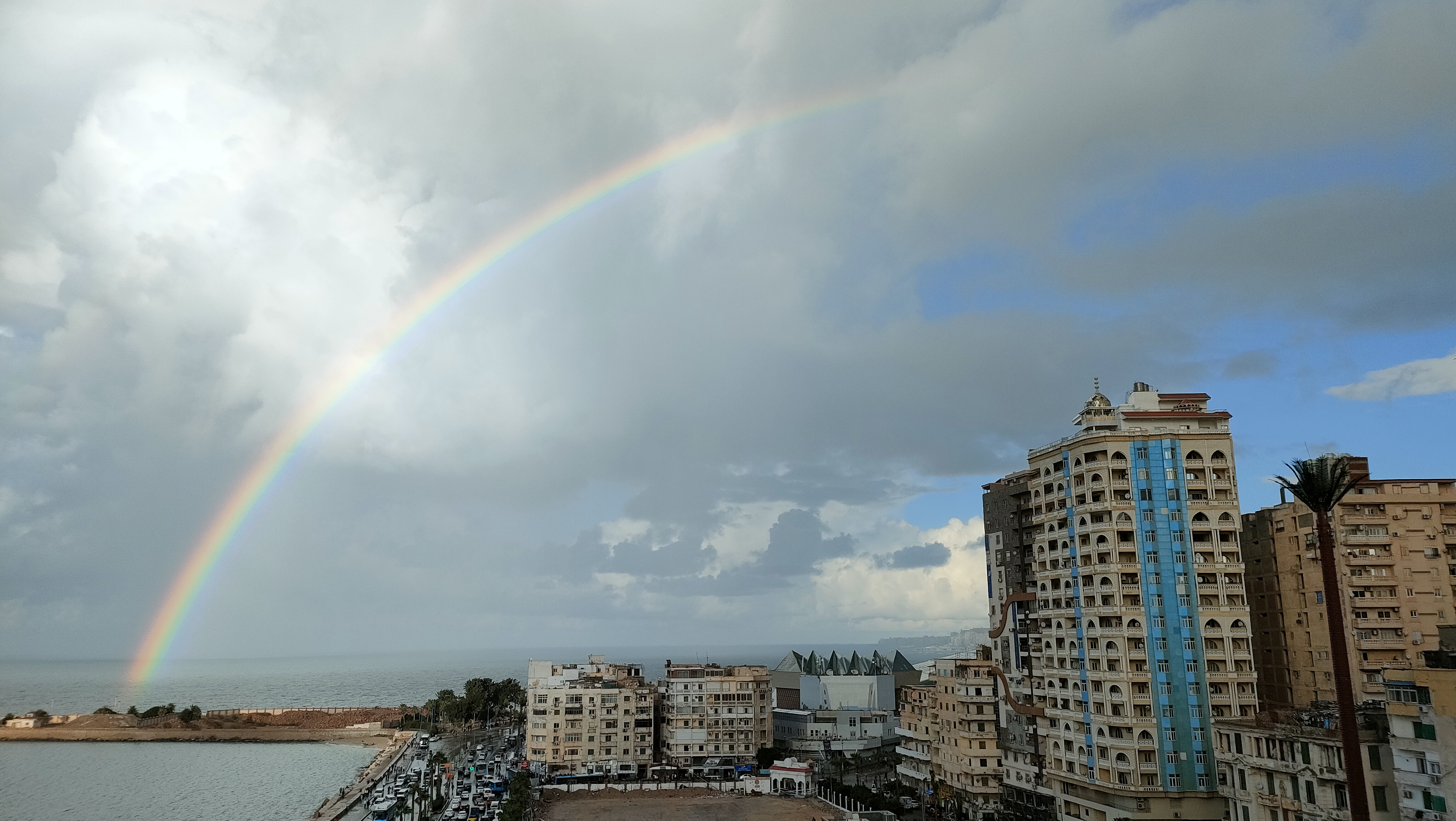
- Shatby's waterfront

- Location in Egypt
- Coordinates: 31.210819°N 29.913783°E
- Country: Egypt
- Governorate: Alexandria Governorate
- City: Alexandria
- Time zone: UTC+2 (EST)

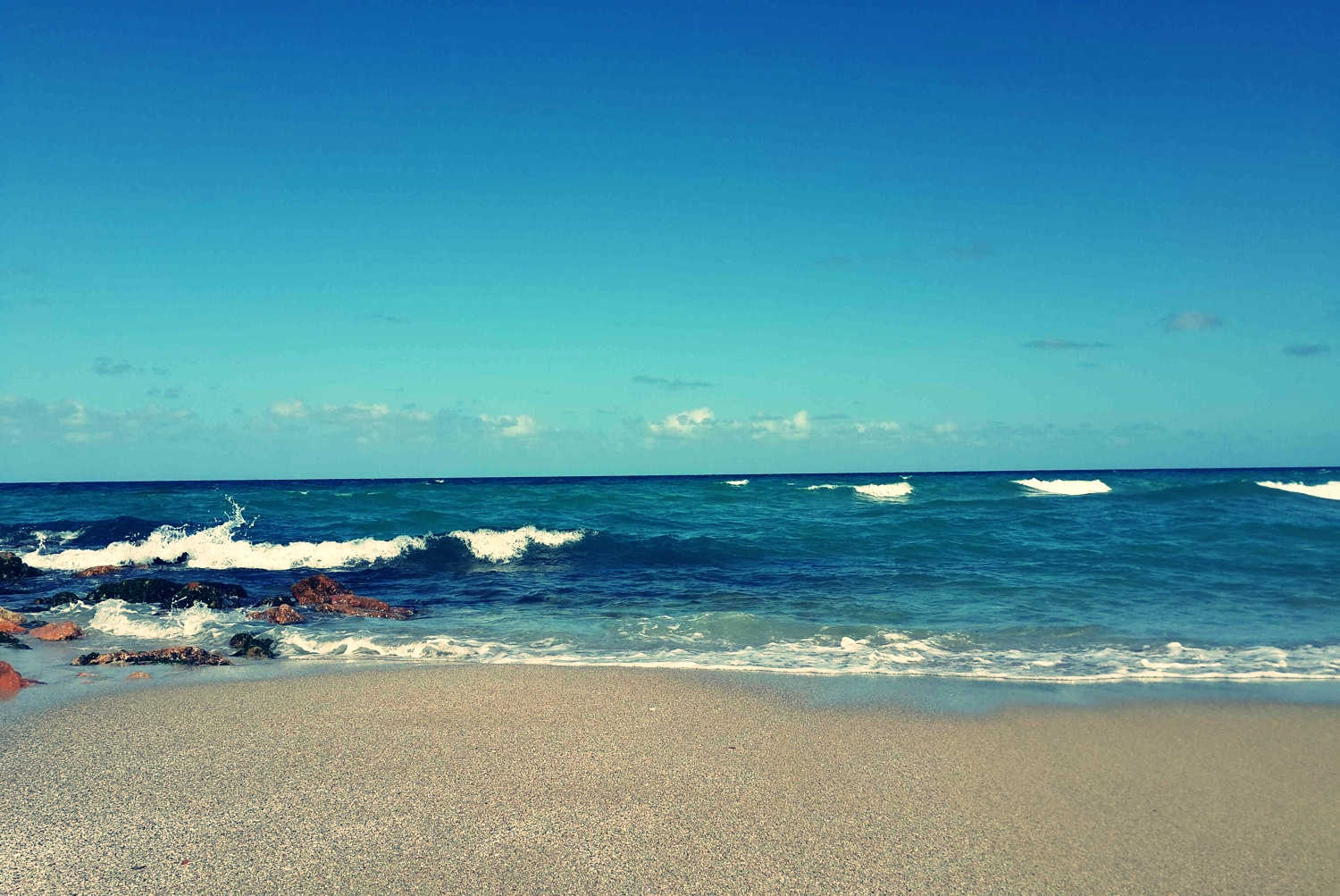
Shatby Beach

Shatby (Arabic: الشاطبي El Shatby) is a neighborhood in Alexandria, Egypt.

== Institutions ==
Many important institutes are located in Shatby, such as:

- Alexandria University
- Bibliotheca Alexandrina
- Collège Saint Marc
- El Nasr Boys' School
- El Nasr Girls' College
- Lycée Français d'Alexandrie (Lycée Al-Horreya)
- Shatby Pediatric Hospital
- Al Ittihad Alexandria Club

== Cemetery and war memorial ==
The main Alexandria cemetery complex is in Shatby. It was designed by Sir Robert Lorimer in 1919. It includes the Alexandria Military and War Memorial Cemetery, a Commonwealth War Cemetery that includes the graves of British and Empire service personnel who died in the First and Second World Wars. 2,259 are from the First World War and 503 are from the Second World War.

Also in the military cemetery is the Shatby Memorial, which commemorates 986 United Kingdom and British Empire service personnel who died at sea in the Mediterranean in the First World War and have no grave on land. Most were killed in the sinking of troop ships or defensively armed merchant ships, including HMT Aragon, HMT Cameronia, HMT Leasowe Castle, HMT Osmanieh and SS Persia.

Commonwealth war graves are also to be found in:

- Shatby British Protestant Cemetery, where are buried three British merchant seamen from HMT Aragon of World War I and seven service personnel and a war correspondent of World War II,
- Shatby Jewish Cemetery Number 3, where are buried 20 service personnel of World War I (of whom 19 are in one plot) and two of World War II, besides a memorial to fallen men of the Zion Mule Corps.

== Tombs of El Shatby (El Shatby Necropolis) ==
=== Location ===
These tombs are situated at the north of Collège Saint Marc from the seaside, in the city of Alexandria east of Selsela area (ancient Lochias). The tombs were discovered by chance in 1893 and 1904 by chance by Giuseppe Botti and Evaristo Breccia.

=== History ===
The tombs are considered to be the most ancient tombs in Alexandria as it dates back to 320 B.C. The site was first located and explored in the first decade of the 20th century by Evaristo Breccia, the second director of the Graeco-Roman Museum in Alexandria. Breccia revealed an impressive monumental subterranean multichambered complex known as Hypogeum A, two smaller corresponding complexes (Hypogea B and C), and an area covered with above-ground monuments in the form of stepped towers (once bases of funerary stelae, or altars over pit tombs). The site was dated back to the last quarter of the 4th Century and the beginning of the 3rd century B.C. As this period corresponds to the time immediately after Alexander The Great found the city of Alexandria, the site was identified with the final resting place of people from Macedonia, Thessaly, Crete, and Asia Minor who came to populate the new city. Still, Breccia never completed the excavation. In 2020 the site was revisited by an international team working in the framework of the Alexandria Necropolis Project (funded by the A.G. Leventis Foundation). The team, under the direction of Prof. Mona Haggag (University of Alexandria, President of the Archaeological Society of Alexandria), Dr. Kyriakos Savvopoulos (University of Oxford) and Professor Hussein Abd El Aziz, aimed at completing the work of Breccia by fully excavating and documenting the site, as well as restoring it into a modern, safe and fully functional and informative heritage site. The project which also involved Egypt' s Ministry of Antiquities (supervision), the Cyprus Institute (digital documentation, 3D model creation) and the National and Kapodistrian University of Athens (excavation, recording, study), was completed in 2023 and provided a complete picture of Hypogeum A, identified the monument’s ancient southern facade, and brought to light skeletons, and abundant portable finds in good condition. After three years of systematic work, the Hellenistic necropolis of Shatby is now a modern archaeological park, unique of its kind in Egypt.

== See also ==
- Neighborhoods in Alexandria
