= El Nasr Girls' College =

El Nasr Girls' College (E.G.C.)
- كلية النصر للبنات

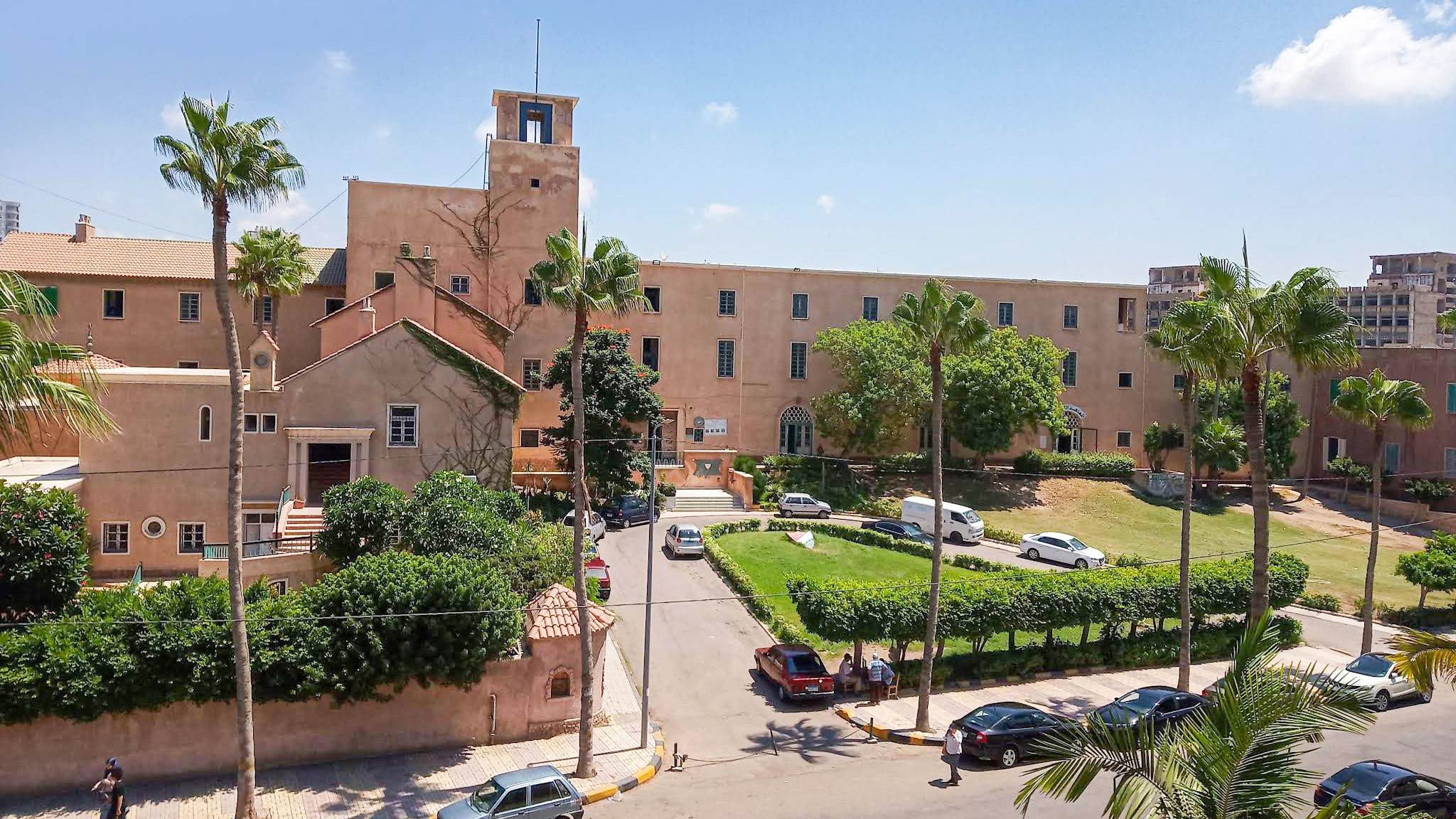

Location
- Shatby; Alexandria; Egypt; 31°12′21.1″N 29°55′16.9″E

Information
- Motto: love, truth, worthiness
- Established: 1935
- Principal: Soheir Abdel Fattah
- Grades: kindergarten to grade 12
- Colors: pink, blue, yellow, green

El Nasr Girls' College (EGC) (Arabic: كلية النصر للبنات) is a school in Shatby, Alexandria, Egypt. It was established in 1935, and was originally known as English Girls College.

== History ==
The college was founded in October 1935 to commemorate the Silver Jubilee of George V during the time when Egypt was under Protectorate status.

The buildings were designed by the English architect George Grey Wornum in a “Spanish – Arabic style of architecture” to accommodate a maximum of 1000 pupils. The buildings stood in over 20 feddans of land donated by the Governorate of Alexandria. The school site went up to the main Boulevard "Abu Keir Avenue". The Minister of Education donated a big section to the faculty of science, which stands there today.

It followed the British education system for a very select group of girls. Historically modelled on English public schools, it originally prepared students for Oxford and Cambridge examinations and also introduced British games.

Until 1956 the staff were all British, but they were expelled as a result of the Suez crisis of 1956.

== Notable alumnae ==
- Queen Sofía of Spain.
- Reem Bassiouney, author and professor of sociolinguistics
- Marwa Ali El-Sherbini, pharmacist and murder victim.
- Mona Makram-Ebeid.
- Mai Ezz Eldin.
- Camelia.

== See also ==
- Educational institutions in Alexandria
- Education in Egypt
- El Nasr Boys' School
