= New Cairo British International School =

- Road 17, 1st Zone, 3rd Settlement, 5th District, New Cairo, Cairo Governorate, Egypt

Information
- Type: Coeducational & Non-profit
- Established: 1978
- Principal: Trevor kearsley
- Website: www.ncbis.co.uk

The New Cairo British International School (NCBIS; Arabic: المدرسة البريطانية الدولية بالقاهرة الجديدة) is a British International school in New Cairo, Cairo Governorate, Egypt.

It was established in 1978 by a group of parents, most of whom were connected with the World Health Organization (WHO). The school has operated since that time as a "not-for-profit organisation" under the auspices of the Heliopolis Society for the Cultural and Social Care of English Speaking Foreigners ('The Society'), and is managed through a board of directors "elected" from amongst the parent community.

The school continues to operate as an international institution offering a British-style and IB-enriched curriculum.
