= Saint Fatima School =

Egyptian private school with many branches

St Fatima School

Location
- 66 Ismail El Kabbany Street; Nasr City, Cairo; Egypt; 30.05901°N 31.333775°E

Information
- Established: 1982
- Director: Nader Younan
- Enrollment: 5000
- Website: stfatima.edu.eg

St. Fatima School is a school in Egypt. Established in 1982, the school serves students in across their entire childhood education. There are many branches, there's one in Nasr City, Badr Suez, Heliopolis, and the New Capital.

== Curriculum ==
The curriculum students follow is dependent on which division of the school they choose to attend. The Language Division follows the Egyptian National Curriculum; the British Division, the British curriculum; which is managed by the Cambridge University, and the American Division, the American curriculum.
