= Manor House School, Cairo =

Coordinates: 30.008278°N 31.418661°E

Manor House School
- Heliopolis, Cairo, Egypt

Information
- Type: Private
- Established: 1976
- Founder: Wanda Bullen
- Website: Manor House School

Manor House School is a private school in Cairo, Egypt. The school provides both National and International certificates (British and American).

The school in its current creation was founded at Heliopolis in 1976 by Mrs Wanda Bullen at the request of the Egyptian government. Mrs Bullen, widow of Keith Bullen, had opened a Manor House School in Cairo some 30 years previously in 1946. This school, however, was sequestered by the Egyptian authorities at the time of the Suez Crisis and the name was changed to Port Said School. Mrs Bullen and her daughter Anne had operated Manor House School in Beirut in the meantime.

In 1977, an additional branch was opened in Mohandeseen and - in 1992 - a separate International faculty was also established at Mohandaseen offering the International General Certificate of Secondary Education based on the British system of education.

The original Mohandeseen National School branch also continued to grow, so another Manor House School section was opened in October 2000, 20 km west of Cairo. This school includes KG to Grade 11 and Grade 12.

== See also ==
- List of schools in Egypt
