= Orouba Language School =

The Orouba Language School is an Egyptian school located at Maadi and Dokki. It was established in Dokki in 1960 and in Maadi in 1985, and offers schooling from preschool through all twelve grades. The institution is equipped with gymnasia, athletic fields, a computer lab, and a library.
