= El Nasr Boys' School =

- مدارس النصر للبنين
- British Boys' School

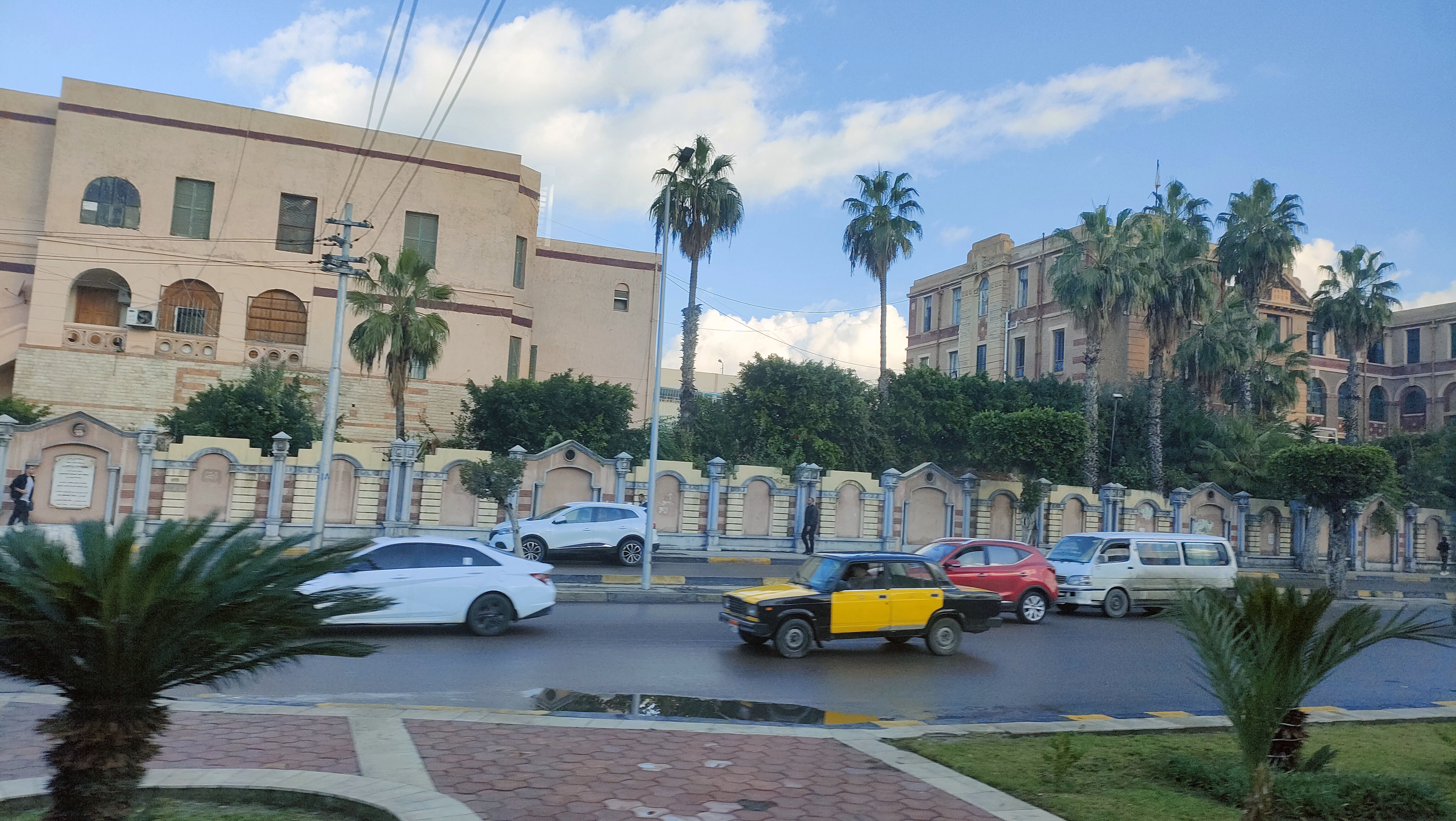

Location
- Shatby; Alexandria; Egypt
- Coordinates: 31.20392°N 29.92056°E

Information
- Type: Private National Institution (previously British system)
- Motto: Long Live E.B.S
- Established: June, 1929
- School district: District of Shatby
- Principal: Mr. Ahmed ElShamy
- Grades: Kindergarten, Primary, Preparatory and Senior, including Foundation to Grade 12 IGCSE and American Diplomafor boys and girls.
- Campus type: Urban
- Colors: Red, Blue and White

El Nasr Boys' School (EBS; Arabic: مدارس النصر للبنين) is a PreK - Grade 12 school in Shatby, Alexandria, Egypt. Founded in 1929, it is one of the oldest schools in the city, and has more than 7,000 students each year.

== History ==
The school was founded in 1929 by the British while Egypt was under British occupation, as the "British Boys' School". After the Egyptian Revolution of 1952, it was renamed the El Nasr Boys' School. It was built in the Shatby area of Alexandria, between Abo Quer and Aflaton streets. Across the street is the El Nasr Girls' College. Also there is another El Nasr school in Heliopolis, Cairo. It provides primary, preparatory, secondary and IGCSE education.

== Education system ==
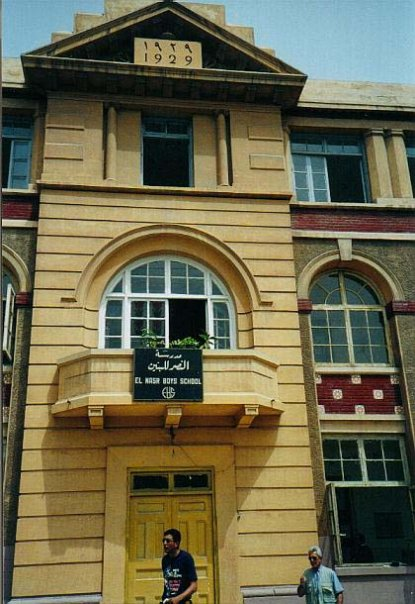
The main building

The school goes from kindergarten through high school, and offers an American Diploma and the IGCSE for boys and girls.

== School anthem ==
Usually, the school anthem is used only on primary stage. After that, in the preparatory and the senior stages, only the national anthem is used.

== Alumni ==
- Robert Bauval, Belgian author
- Ahmed Nazif, former Prime Minister of Egypt
- Amr Waked, Egyptian actor
- Islam El-Shater, Egyptian footballer
- Amr Warda, Egyptian football player
- Erol Gelenbe, French-Turkish Computer Scientist and Member of several National Academies of Science and Engineering
- Adham Sharara, President of the International Table Tennis Federation 1999-2014

== See also ==
- Educational institutions in Alexandria
- Education in Egypt
