= Timeline of Alexandria =

The following is a timeline of the history of the city of Alexandria, Egypt.

== Greek era (331–30 BC) ==
- 331 BC – Rhacotis renamed "Alexandria" by Alexander the Great (approximate date).
- 330 BC – Cleomenes of Naucratis appointed Governor of Egypt by Alexander, begins to turn the small village into the Capital of Egypt.

=== 323–30 BC ===
Egypt's capital under Ptolemaic dynasty

- 323 BC – Alexander dies. Ptolemy I Soter appointed "Satrap" of Egypt.
- 305 BC – Ptolemy I proclaims himself king.
- 283 BC – Library of Alexandria opens (approximate date).
- 247 BC – Lighthouse of Alexandria built (approximate date).
- 170 BC – Seleucid "Emperor" Antiochus IV Epiphanes briefly conquers Egypt
- 168 BC – First Roman intervention. City briefly invaded.
- 1st century BC – Caesareum built.

== 48 BC–365 AD Romans in power ==
- 48 BC – Julius Caesar conquers Alexandria.
- 48 BC – Great Royal Library of Alexandria burned.
- 47 BC – Siege of Alexandria.
- 47 BC – Caesar victorious.
- 44 BC – Assassination of Julius Caesar in Rome.
- 40 BC – Cleopatra VII marries Roman triumvir Mark Antony.
- 30 BC – Battle of Alexandria. Death of Antony and Cleopatra.
- 29 BC – Augustus takes city. Cornelius Gallus first prefect of Egypt.
- 25 BC – Strabo, the Greek geographer and philosopher, visits Alexandria.
- 19 AD – Germanicus resident in city.

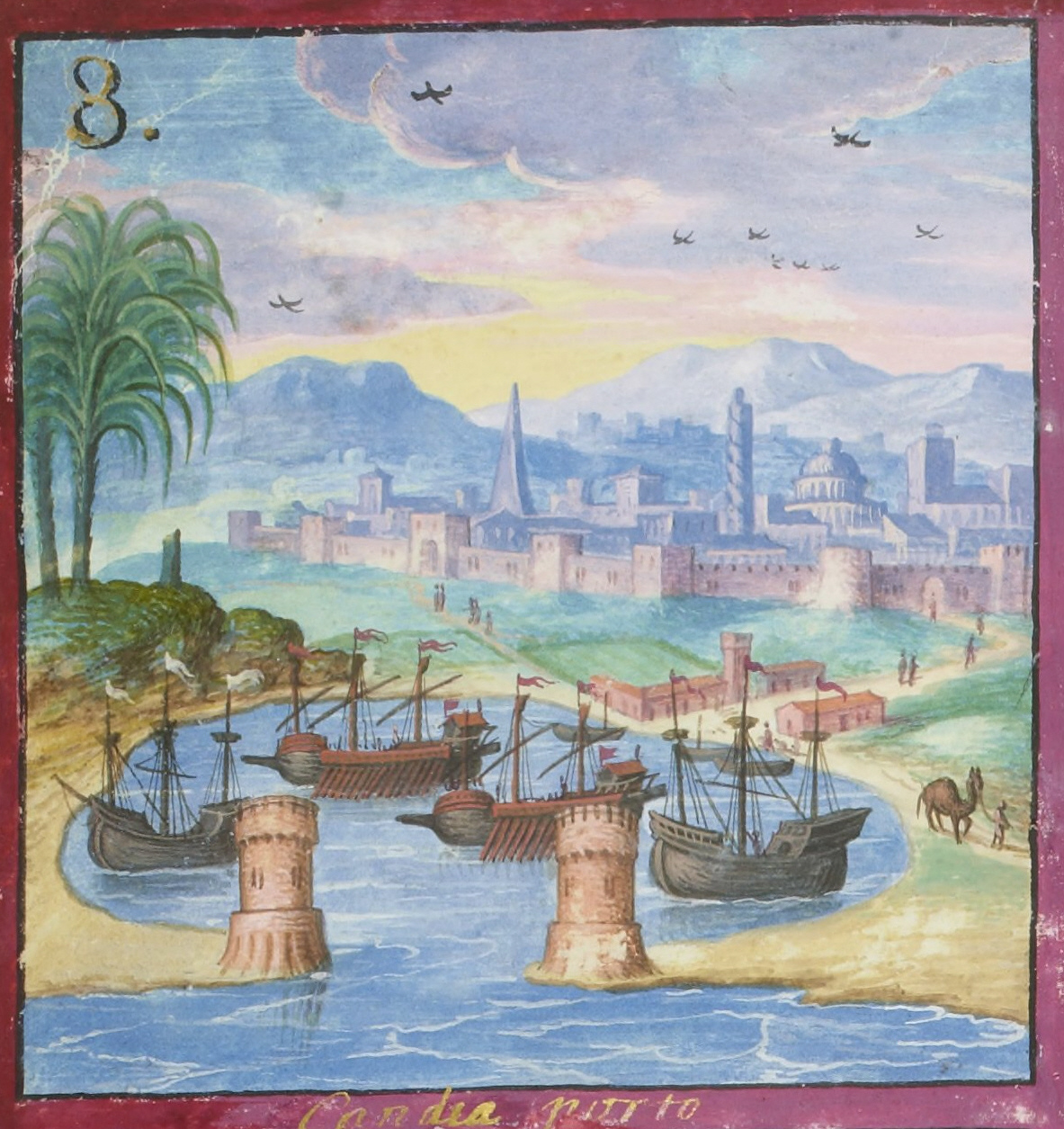
Alexandria, 16th century

- 38 AD – Pogrom against Jews.
- 115 AD – City sacked during a Jewish revolt. Possible genocide.
- 122 AD – Hadrian rebuilds city.
- 175 AD – Failed revolution of Avidius Cassius.
- 176 AD – Catechetical School of Alexandria (oldest such school in the world) founded. Some records say 190 AD; see article.
- 297 AD – Pompey's Pillar built.
- 365 AD – The 365 Crete earthquake affects the Greek island of Crete with a maximum Mercalli intensity of XI (Extreme), causing a destructive tsunami that affects the coasts of Libya and Egypt, especially Alexandria. Many thousands were killed.

== Byzantine rule 390–650 ==
- 391 – Theodosius I orders destruction of pagan temples.
- 395 – Roman Empire formally split in two. The official start of so-called Byzantine Empire.
- 415 – Lynching of the philosopher Hypatia by a radical Christian mob. The expulsion of the Jews from Alexandria, in 414 or 415 under the leadership of Saint Cyril. Around 100,000 Jews expelled—another Pogrom or "Alexandria Expulsion".
- 619 – City besieged; Sassanid Persians in power.
- 641–642 – City besieged; Arabs in power; capital of Egypt relocates from Alexandria to Fustat.
- 645 – Byzantines back in power.
- 646 – Arabs back in power, following the Battle of Nikiou

== Muslim Rule 700–1800 ==
- 680 – Saint Mark's Coptic Orthodox Cathedral rebuilt.
- 956 – Earthquake.
- 1303 – Earthquake.
- 1323 – Earthquake. The Pharos lighthouse collapses.
- 1354 – Eliyahu Hanavi Synagogue built.
- 1365 – October: City besieged by Cypriot forces.
- 1381 – Zaradel Synagogue established
- 1477 – Citadel of Qaitbay established.
- 1519 – Ottoman conquest
- 1775 – El-Mursi Abul Abbas Mosque built.
- 1798 – French forces under Napoleon Bonaparte besiege and conquer what is now just a town.
- 1800 – Nadir of the city. Population: a mere 8,000.

== 19th century ==
- 1801
  - 21 March: Battle between French and British forces.
  - 17 August – 2 September: City besieged by British forces.
  - 2 September: Capitulation to British.
- 1807
  - 7 March - September 25: City occupied by the British forces
- 1819 – Mahmoudiyah Canal constructed.
- 1821 – Population: 12,528.
- 1829 – Dockyard and arsenal open.
- 1833 – April: Luxor Obelisk shipped to Paris.
- 1834 – Ras el-Tin Palace construction begins.
- 1840 – Population: 60,000.
- 1847 – Ras el-Tin Palace built.
- 1850 – Eliyahu Hanavi Synagogue restored.
- 1853 – Azouz Synagogue rebuilt.
- 1856
  - Cairo-Alexandria railway begins operating.
  - Cathedral of Evangelismos dedicated.
- 1859
  - Institut d'Egypte founded.
  - Theatre Europeen reopens.
- 1860 – Alexandria Ramleh Train Station established.
- 1862 – Zizinia Theatre built.
- 1861 – Cotton boom.
- 1863
  - Horse-drawn trams begin operating.
  - Population: 170,000.
- 1865 – Gas lighting introduced.
- 1865–1869 – New port created.
- 1871 – International Cotton Exchange (Bourse) of Minet el-Bassal built.
- 1872 – Population c. 200,000 (ca. 20% foreigners).
- 1873
  - Breakwater built in harbour.
  - Statue unveiled in Midan Muhammad Ali.
- 1875 – Al-Ahram newspaper begins publication.
- 1877 – One of Cleopatra's Needles shipped to London.
- 1880 – The Egyptian Gazette launched in Alexandria.
- 1880 – One of Cleopatra's Needles shipped to New York City.
- 1880 – Zaradel Synagogue restored.
- 1881 – al-Tankit wa al-Tabkit newspaper begins publication.
- 1882
  - 11 July: Anti-European riots; city bombarded by British naval forces.
  - Population: 232,626.
- 1883 – Alexandria Stock Exchange founded.
- 1887 – El-Hakaneia Palace built.
- 1892
  - Graeco-Roman Museum established.
  - Salamlek Palace built.
- 1896 – First Cinema Projection in the city took place.

== 20th century ==
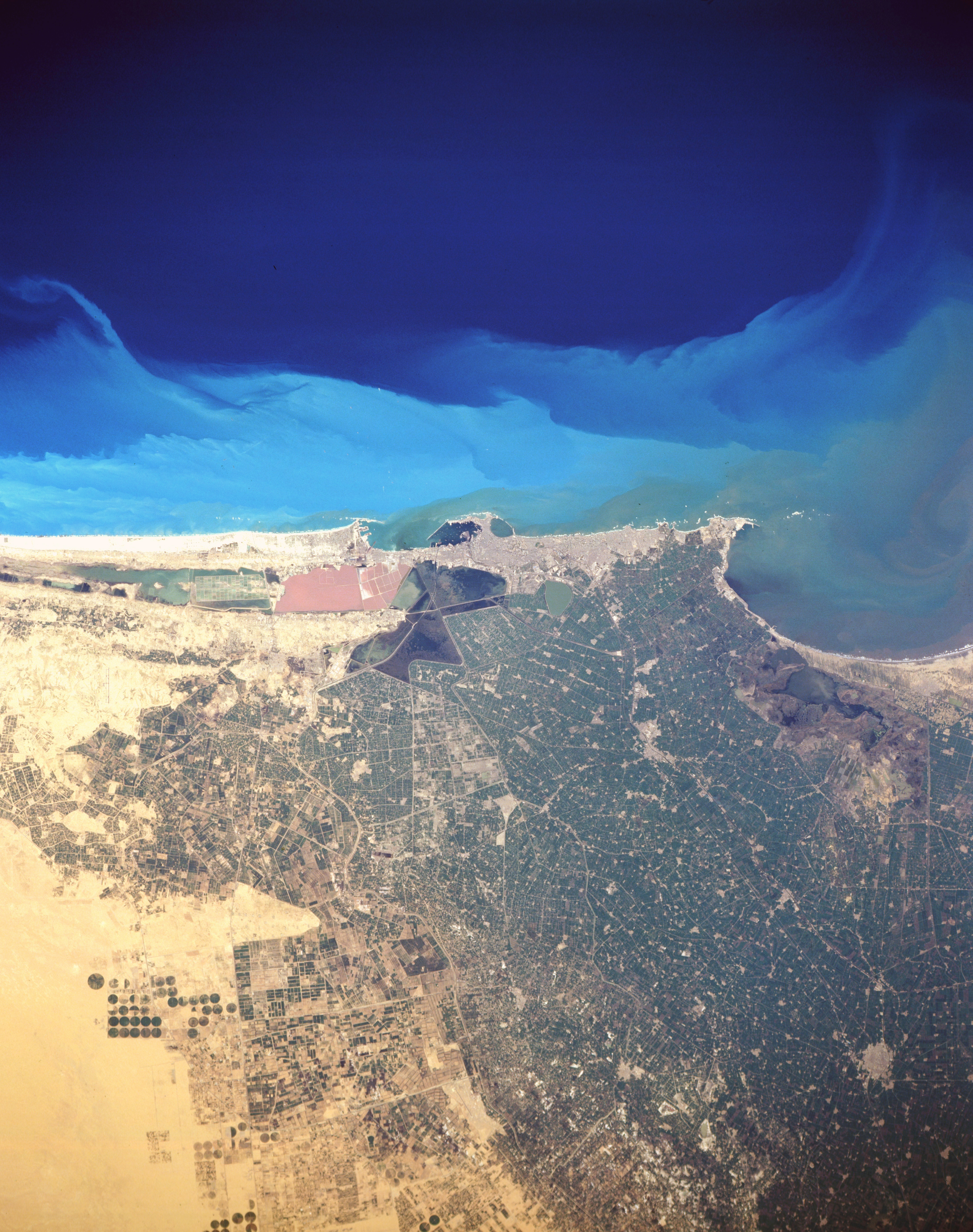
Aerial view of Alexandria, 1990

- 1901 – Green Synagogue established.
- 1902
  - Electric trams begin operating.
  - Victoria College founded.
- 1903 – Khedivial yacht club built.
- 1905 – Sea wall constructed.
- 1907 – Population: 332,246.
- 1910 – Hellenic Football Club Alexandria formed.
- 1910 – Sasson Synagogue established.
- 1914 – Al Ittihad Alexandria Club formed.
- 1917 – Population c. 460,000 (c. 20% foreigners).
- 1919 – Princess Fatma Al-Zahra palace built.
- 1920 – Castro Synagogue established.
- 1920 – Nezah Israel Synagogue established.
- 1921 – Alexandria Opera House opens.
- 1922 – Shaaré Tefila Synagogue established.
- 1925 – Scottish School for Girls founded.
- 1927 – Population c. 600,000 (ca. 17% foreigners).
- 1928 – Collège Saint Marc founded.
- 1929
  - Alexandria Stadium opens.
  - English Boys' School established.
- 1930 – Alexandria Aquarium opens.
- 1932 – Al-Haramlik Palace built.
- 1934 – Corniche constructed.
- 1935 – English Girls College founded.
- 1937 – Eliahou Hazan Synagogue established.
- 1938 – Publication of The Egyptian Gazette moved from Alexandria to Cairo.
- 1941 – 19 December: Conflict between Italian and British naval forces.
- 1942 – Farouk University established.
- 1947 – Population: 919,024; (c. 11% foreigners).
- 1950 – Hassab hospital established.
- 1952 – Egyptian coup d'état.
- 1954 – 26 October: Alleged assassination attempt of Nasser during speech in Mansheya.
- 1958 – Alexandria Zoo opens.
- 1960 – Siddiq Abdul-Latif becomes mayor.
- 1964 – September: Arab League summit held.
- 1965 – Population c. 1.5 million.
- 1969 – St. Takla Haymanot's Church consecrated.
- 1974 – Population: 2,259,000.
- 1980 – El Alamein-Alexandria highway constructed.
- 1986
  - Ismail El-Gawsaqi becomes mayor.
  - Port of Dekheila constructed.
  - Royal Jewelry Museum inaugurated.
- 1990 – Senghor University founded.
- 1992 – Population: 3,380,000 (estimate).
- 1996 – Alexandria Institute Of Technology founded.
- 1997 – Abdel-Salam El-Mahgoub becomes mayor.
- 1999 – Swedish Institute Alexandria established.

== 21st century ==
- 2001 – Alexandria Center of Arts opens.
- 2002
  - Bibliotheca Alexandrina inaugurated.
  - City named World Book Capital by UNESCO.
- 2003
  - Harras El-Hedoud Stadium opens.
  - Alexandria National Museum inaugurated.
- 2006
  - Adel Labib becomes mayor.
  - January–February: 2006 Africa Cup of Nations held.
  - Population: 4,110,015.
  - Pharos University established.
- 2007
  - Borg El Arab Stadium opens.
  - San Stefano Grand Plaza built.
- 2009 – Sadat Museum inaugurated.
- 2010 – Population: 4,358,439.
- 2011
  - Egyptian revolution
  - 1 January: Bombing of Saints Church.
- 2012 – Protests against state president Mohamed Morsi.
- 2013 – January: Anti-Morsi protests.
- 2017 – Population: 5,163,750 (urban agglomeration).

== See also ==
- History of Alexandria
- List of mayors of Alexandria since 1960 (in French)
- Of Alexandria
- Timelines of other cities in Egypt: Cairo, Port Said
- Timeline of Egypt

== Bibliography ==
Published in 18th–19th century

- Carsten Niebuhr (1792). "Of the City of Alexandria". Travels through Arabia. Half-title:Niebuhr's travels through Arabia and other countries in the East. Translated by Robert Heron. Edinburgh: R. Morison and Son. hdl:2027/hvd.hxj9mv – via HathiTrust.
- H. A. S. Dearborn (1819), "Alexandria", A Memoir on the Commerce and Navigation of the Black Sea, Boston: Wells & Lilly
- Jedidiah Morse; Richard C. Morse (1823), "Alexandria", A New Universal Gazetteer (4th ed.), New Haven: S. Converse
- Josiah Conder (1827), "Topographical Description: Alexandria", The Modern Traveller, London: J.Duncan, OCLC 8876014
- Gardner Wilkinson (1847), "Alexandria", Hand-book for Travellers in Egypt, J. Murray, OCLC 23931478
- J. Willoughby Rosse (1858). "Alexandria". Index of Dates ... Facts in the Chronology and History of the World. London: H.G. Bohn. hdl:2027/uva.x030807786 – via HathiTrust.
- I. Smith Homans (1859), "Alexandria", Cyclopedia of Commerce and Commercial Navigation (2nd ed.), New York: Harper
- Bayard Taylor (1874), "Alexandria After 22 Years", Egypt and Iceland in the Year 1874, New York: G.P. Putnam
- H. de Vaujany (1885), Alexandrie et la Basse-Égypte (in French), Paris: Librairie Plon, OL 24146809M
- Ali Mubarak (1886–1889). "v.7: Alexandria". Al-Khitat (in Arabic). al-Maṭbaʻah al-Kubrá al-Amīrīyah.
- Ibrahim-Hilmy (1886), "Alexandria", The literature of Egypt and the Soudan from the earliest times to the year 1885 inclusive: a bibliography, London: Trübner and Co.
- "Alexandria", Appleton's European Guide Book, New York: D. Appleton & Co., 1888
- Library, Boston Public (1893). "Egypt: Places and Cities: Alexandria". Bulletin of the Public Library of the City of Boston (94).

Published in 20th century

- "Alexandria". Guide to Palestine and Egypt. London: Macmillan and Co. 1901.
- T.G. Bonney; et al. (1904), "Alexandria", The Mediterranean, its Storied Cities and Venerable Ruins, New York: J. Pott
- Ernest Alfred Wallis Budge (1906), "Alexandria", Cook's Handbook for Egypt and the Sudan (2nd ed.), London: T. Cook & Son, OCLC 7434398
- "Alexandria". Guide to Egypt and the Sudan (5th ed.). London: Macmillan and Co. 1908.
- Cana, Frank Richardson; Atkinson, Charles Francis; Hogarth, David George (1910). "Alexandria (Egypt)" . Encyclopædia Britannica. Vol. 1 (11th ed.). pp. 568–572.
- "Alexandria", The Mediterranean, Leipzig: Karl Baedeker, 1911, OCLC 490068
- Rhuvon Guest (1913–1936), "al-Iskandarīya", Encyclopaedia of Islam (1st ed.), Brill, ISBN 978-90-04-08265-6
- Breccia, Evaristo (1914), Alexandrea ad Aegyptum; guide de la ville ancienne et moderne et du Musée gréco-romain (in French), Bergamo: Istituto italiano d'arti grafiche, OL 13523639M
- Jonet (1921). Atlas historique de la ville et des ports d'Alexandrie (in French). Cairo.
- E. M. Forster (1922), Alexandria: a History and a Guide, Alexandria: W. Morris
- Michael J. Reimer (1988). "Colonial Bridgehead: Social and Spatial Change in Alexandria, 1850–1882". International Journal of Middle East Studies. 20 (4): 531–553. doi:10.1017/S0020743800053885. JSTOR 163400. S2CID 162806230.
- Noelle Watson, ed. (1996). "Alexandria". International Dictionary of Historic Places: Middle East and Africa. UK: Routledge. ISBN 1-884964-03-6.

Published in 21st century

- Paul Tiyambe Zeleza; Dickson Eyoh, eds. (2003). "Alexandria, Egypt". Encyclopedia of Twentieth-Century African History. Routledge. ISBN 0-415-23479-4.
- Kevin Shillington, ed. (2005). "Alexandria". Encyclopedia of African History. Fitzroy Dearborn. ISBN 978-1-57958-245-6.
- Josef W. Meri, ed. (2006). "Alexandria". Medieval Islamic Civilization. Routledge. p. 30. ISBN 978-0-415-96691-7.
- Gabor Agoston; Bruce Alan Masters, eds. (2009). "Alexandria". Encyclopedia of the Ottoman Empire. Facts on File. p. 33. ISBN 978-1-4381-1025-7.
- David Abulafia (2011). "A Tale of Four and a Half Cities, 1900–1950". The Great Sea: A Human History of the Mediterranean. Oxford University Press. p. 588. ISBN 978-0-19-975263-8. (about Alexandria, Jaffa, Salonika, Smyrna)
