= Shaaré Tefila Synagogue =

Former synagogue in Alexandria, Egypt

Religion
- Affiliation: Judaism (former)
- Ecclesiastical or organizational status: Synagogue
- Status: Closed

Location
- Location: Camp Sheraz, Alexandria
- Country: Egypt

Architecture
- Funded by: Enzarawat and Sharbein families
- Completed: 1922

The Shaaré Tefila Synagogue, also known as the Anzarut Synagogue, or Charbit Synagogue, was a former Jewish synagogue, that was located in the Camp Sheraz district of Alexandria, Egypt. The synagogue was completed in 1922 by the Enzarawat and Sharbein families.

== See also ==
- History of the Jews in Egypt
- List of synagogues in Egypt
- Azouz Synagogue
- Castro Synagogue
- Eliyahu Hanavi Synagogue
- Green Synagogue
- Zaradel Synagogue
