= GLIM =

GLIM or Glim may refer to:

- Glim, a neighborhood in Alexandria, Egypt
- GLIM (software) (Generalized Linear Interactive Modelling), a statistical software program for fitting generalized linear models
- Jonas Glim, a DC Comics character
- Glim (or glimmer), a reflective device used for cheating in poker or other card games
- Great Lakes Institute of Management in Chennai, India
- Gradient light interference microscopy, a version of Differential interference contrast microscopy
