= Zaradel Synagogue =

Former synagogue in Alexandria, Egypt

Religion
- Affiliation: Judaism (former)
- Rite: Nusach Sefard
- Ecclesiastical or organizational status: Synagogue
- Status: Closed

Location
- Location: Rue de France (Amram Street), Old Fish Market, Alexandria
- Country: Egypt

Architecture
- Founder: Saul the Sephardi
- Funded by: Zaradel family
- Established: 1381 (as a congregation)
- Completed: 1881 (rebuild)

The Zaradel Synagogue was a former Jewish synagogue, that was located on Rue de France (Amram Street), in the Old Fish Market (Souk el-Samak el Kadim), in Alexandria, Egypt. It was the oldest synagogue in Alexandria.

== History ==
The first synagogue in the Old Fish Market was built in 1381 by Judah, the son of Saul, the Sephardic Abu Isaac. The original foundation stone of the 1381 building, since dislocated, read:

I, Yehouda, son of Rav Saul Sephar, son of Isaac of revered memory, have brought…, built… for the forgiveness of my soul and my parents’ soul in the year 1311 of the destruction of the Temple… .

In 1881 the synagogue went through renovations, which changed it completely. The Spanish origins of the founder (Saul the Sephardi), do not testify to the identity of the congregation who prayed in the synagogue during later periods. Dedications inscribed on ritual objects donated to the Zaradel Synagogue reveal that some of them were of North African origin, known as Mughrabim, as the finial donated by Jacob Zuaris and his sons, who originated from Guarish (Gawarish) in Libya.

== See also ==
- History of the Jews in Egypt
- List of synagogues in Egypt
- Azouz Synagogue
- Eliyahu Hanavi Synagogue
- Green Synagogue
