= Timeline of Port Said =

The following is a timeline of the history of the city of Port Said, Egypt.

== Prior to 20th century ==
- 1859
  - Port Said founded.
  - Population: 150.
- 1861 - Population: 4,000.
- 1863 - Sweet Water Canal built.
- 1869
  - Port Said Lighthouse begins operating.
  - November: Suez Canal opens.
- 1870 - Coal heaving porters guild established.
- 1870s - Anti-European unrest.
- 1881 - Abbas Mosque commissioned (built later).
- 1883 - Population: 17,000.
- 1895 - Headquarter of the Suez Canal Authority in Port Said built.
- 1896 - First Cinema Projection in the city took place.
- 1899 - De Lesseps statue unveiled on Jetee Ouest (pier).

== 20th century ==
- 1904 - Cairo-Port Said railway begins operating.
- 1917 - Russian battleship Peresvet sinks offshore.
- 1920 - Al-Masry Sporting Club founded.
- 1926
  - Port Fouad founded on opposite side of Suez Canal.
  - Catholic Diocese of the Canal of Suez established.
- 1947 - Population: 177,703.
- 1955 - Port Said Stadium opens.
- 1956
  - 5 November: British and French forces arrive during Suez Crisis.
  - 23 December: British and French troops depart.
  - December: Moorhouse Affair.
- 1960 - Population: 244,000.
- 1967 - After Israeli forces occupy Sinai Peninsula, some residents begin to flee city.
- 1974 - Population: 342,000.
- 1976
  - Suez Canal University established.
  - Port Said declared a duty-free port.
- 1992 - Population: 460,000 (estimate).
- 1995 - Museum of Modern Art opens.
- 1998 - History Gardens laid out.
- 1999 - Port Said Hall (arena) opens.

== 21st century ==
- 2004
  - Suez Canal Container Terminal begins operating.
  - Misr Public Library inaugurated.
- 2005 - Port Said International School opens.
- 2008
  - December: 2008 Arab Futsal Championship held.
  - Population: 588,938.
- 2010
  - Port Said University established.
  - Population: 603,787.
- 2012 - 1 February: Port Said Stadium riot.
- 2013
  - 26 January: Unrest begins after verdict of stadium riot.
  - 27 January: Anti-Morsi protest.
  - 17–19 February: Labor strike, protest.
  - March: Unrest.
- 2017 - Population: 749,371 (urban agglomeration).

== See also ==
- History of Port Said
- Timelines of other cities in Egypt: Alexandria, Cairo
- Timeline of Egypt
