= Green Synagogue =

Former synagogue in Alexandria, Egypt

- Location of the former synagogue, relative to the Nile Delta

Religion
- Affiliation: Judaism (former)
- Ecclesiastical or organizational status: Synagogue
- Status: Closed

Location
- Location: Wabour Al Mey, Bab Sharqi, Moharam Bek, Central District, Alexandria
- Country: Egypt
- Interactive map of Green Synagogue
- Coordinates: 31°12′00″N 29°55′07″E

Architecture
- Architect: Abraham Green
- Type: Synagogue architecture
- Completed: 1901

The Green Synagogue was a former Jewish synagogue, that was located near Wabour Al Mey, Bab Sharqi, in the Moharam Bek neighborhood, in the Central District of Alexandria, Egypt. The synagogue was completed in 1901 and draws its name from its architect, Abraham Green.

== See also ==
- History of the Jews in Egypt
- List of synagogues in Egypt
- Eliyahu Hanavi Synagogue
- Castro Synagogue
- Azouz Synagogue
