= Shaare Tefila =

Shaare Tefila or Shaarei/Shaarey Tfiloh/Tphiloh (Hebrew: שַׁעֲרֵי תְפִלָה "Gates of Prayer") may refer to the following synagogues:

- Shaaré Tefila Synagogue (Alexandria, Egypt)
- Shaarei Tfiloh Synagogue (Baltimore, Maryland, U.S.)
- Shaarey Tphiloh (Portland, Maine, U.S.)
- Temple Shaaray Tefila (Manhattan, New York, U.S.)
- Congregation Shaaray Tefila (Lawrence, New York, U.S.)
- Shaare Tefila Congregation (Olney, Maryland, U.S.), target of antisemitic vandalism that became the subject of the decision in Shaare Tefila Congregation v. Cobb
