= History of the Jews under Muslim rule =

Jews in the Muslim world in 2021
Jews in Iran during the commemoration of Jewish martyrs of the Iran–Iraq War
Country	Population
Azerbaijan	20,000–30,000
Turkey	14,000 to 26,000
Nigeria	10,000-13,000
Uzbekistan	9,865–10,000
Iran	9,000–15,000
Kazakhstan	2,000–3,300
Morocco	2,000–2,500
Tunisia	1,500–2,000
Kyrgyzstan	500–1,500
Bosnia and Herzegovina	500–1,000
Turkmenistan	200–1,000
Algeria	100–200
Others	7,000+ (including Jewish expats)
Total (approx)	73,700 – 109,500

Countless Jewish communities were among the peoples who lived under Muslim rule with the spread of Islam, which began in the early 7th century in the time of Muhammad and the early Muslim conquests.

Under Islamic rule, Jews, along with Christians and certain other pre-Islamic monotheistic religious groups, were considered "People of the Book" and given the status of dhimmi (Arabic: ذِمّيّ 'of the covenant'), which granted them certain rights while imposing specific obligations and restrictions. The treatment of Jews varied significantly depending on the period and location. For example, during the Almohad period in North Africa and Spain, Jews faced harsh persecution and were forced to convert to Islam, flee, or face severe consequences. In contrast, during waves of persecution in medieval Europe, many Jews found refuge in Muslim lands where conditions were comparatively more tolerant during certain eras, such as in the Ottoman Empire, where many Jews living in Spain migrated to after the Expulsion of Jews from Spain.

The introduction of nationalist ideologies (including Zionism and Arab nationalism), the impact of colonial policies, and the establishment of modern nation-states altered the status and the dynamics of Jewish communities in Muslim-majority countries. These shifts culminated in the large-scale emigration of Jews from the Middle East and North Africa and other various Muslim countries during the mid-20th century. Today, Jews residing in Muslim countries have been reduced to a small fraction of their former sizes, with Azerbaijan, Iran, Nigeria, Uzbekistan and Turkey being home to the largest remaining Jewish populations, followed by significant communities in Morocco, Tunisia, and Kazakhstan and remaining smaller ones in Lebanon, Yemen, Algeria, Syria, Pakistan and Iraq. This was due to Arab nationalism, religious beliefs, economic reasons, widespread persecution, antisemitism, political instability and curbing of human rights in Muslim-majority countries. In 2018, the Jewish Agency for Israel estimated that around 27,000 Jews live in Arab and Muslim countries.

== Introduction ==
At the end of the 19th century, early modern chroniclers such as Moïse Franco, Samuel Rozanes, and Abraham Galante began documenting various aspects of Ottoman Jewish history. One of the first works on the subject—at least in French—was Moïse Franco's Essai sur l'Histoire des Israélites de l'Empire Ottoman: Depuis les Origines Jusqu'à Nos Jours (1897).

The second generation of studies focused more on rabbinic responsa, using them as primary historical sources. At the same time, "[Jewish] Orientalists looked back, nostalgically, to medieval Islam, especially Muslim Spain, 'mythically' imagining Islamdom to have been a tolerant society, granting Jews the freedom and equality that they, as Central European Jews, particularly those in Germany, yearned for from their Christian compatriots."

Among the most prominent scholars on this topic is Bernard Lewis, whose book The Jews of Islam remains a key reference in the field. Additionally, the collective volume led by Abdelwahab Meddeb and Benjamin Stora, A History of Jewish-Muslim Relations: From the Origins to the Present Day, provides a comprehensive perspective by incorporating insights from scholars of various backgrounds.

A persistent debate in this field concerns the actual conditions of Jewish life under Muslim rule. Historians offer divergent perspectives, often shaped by historical, ideological, or methodological considerations. The diversity of Jewish experiences across different Muslim dynasties and regions complicates efforts to present a single, uniform narrative.

Bernard Lewis summarized this complexity as follows:

The claim to tolerance, now much heard from Muslim apologists and more especially from apologists for Islam, is new and of alien origin." [...] Discrimination was always there, permanent and indeed necessary, inherent in the system and institutionalized in law and practice. Persecution, that is to say, violent and active repression, was rare and atypical.

Historian Mark R. Cohen has a very similar understanding:

In the Middle Ages, tolerance, in the modern, liberal meaning of full equality, was not considered to be a virtue to be emulated. Monotheistic religions were by nature mutually intolerant. Adherents of the religion in power considered it their right and duty to treat the others as inferiors rejected by God, and, in extreme cases, to treat them harshly, even to encourage them (in some cases by force) to abandon their faith in favor of the faith of the rulers. Though the religious minorities (Jews living under Christian rule; Jews and Christians living under Muslim rule) were hardly happy with their second-class status and legal inferiority, let alone the occasional persecutions, for the most part they accepted their inequality and subordination with resignation. As long as they were allowed to live in security and practice their religion without interference—this was “toleration” in the medieval sense of the word—they were generally content."

In addition, he proposes a comparative approach to understanding Jewish life under Islamic rule, noting that Jews in Islamic lands often experienced less physical violence than Jews under Western Christendom. He posits that Muslims considered Jews less theologically threatening than Christians did, suggesting that the Christians wanted to establish a separate religious identity from Judaism, from which their faith split and diverged. According to him, instances of persecution were occasional, more the exception than the rule.

In contrast, historians as Raphael Israeli, Paul Fenton, David Littman present a significantly different perspective, emphasizing the structural discrimination and subjugation of Jews under Islamic rule. Israeli further stresses that, unlike in Christian Europe, where Jews were often expelled, Muslim rulers typically allowed Jewish communities to remain but under conditions of perpetual dependency and vulnerability to arbitrary state policies. Raphael Israeli argues that the perception of Islamic tolerance toward Jews is an oversimplification that ignores the recurrent episodes of forced conversion, massacres, and humiliating regulations imposed on Jewish communities throughout Islamic history.

The situation where Jews in the Muslim world both enjoyed cultural and economic prosperity at times, but were widely persecuted there at other times, was summarised in 1971 by the historian Gustave E. von Grunebaum:

It would not be difficult to put together the names of a very sizable number of Jewish subjects or citizens of the Islamic area who have attained to high rank, to power, to great financial influence, to significant and recognized intellectual attainment; and the same could be done for Christians. But it would again not be difficult to compile a lengthy list of persecutions, arbitrary confiscations, attempted forced conversions, or pogroms.

== The emergence of Islam ==
Since classical antiquity, Jewish communities have existed across the East Asia, North Africa, and the Mediterranean that would later come to be parts of the Muslim world. By the time of the early Muslim conquests in the seventh century, these ancient communities had been ruled by various empires and included the Babylonian, Persian, Carthaginian, Greek, Roman, Byzantine, Ottoman and Yemenite Jews.

=== Jewish tribes in Medina ===
By the time of Muhammad’s birth in 570 CE, the Jewish communities of the Hijaz had become integral to Arabian society, participating as merchants, farmers, poets, artisans, and warriors. At the time of his migration to Yathrib (Medina) in 622 CE, Jewish tribes such as the Banu Qurayza, Banu Nadir, and Banu Qaynuqa coexisted with Arab tribes like the Banu Aws and Banu Khazraj. These groups often lived together based on shared economic, social, and political interests rather than strict tribal divisions. In Medina, the Jewish tribes held significant influence, including control over agriculture and the ability to act as intermediaries in local disputes.

=== The constitution of Medina ===
Upon arriving in Medina, Muhammad mediated between the city’s factions and established the Constitution of Medina, which aimed to unify its Jewish and Muslim inhabitants. This agreement declared, “The Jews of the Banu Awf are one community (umma) with the believers. The Jews have their laws (dīn), and the Muslims have theirs.” Other Jewish tribes were also included in the agreement, which emphasized mutual support and protection against external threats. Scholars suggest that the final redaction of this agreement may have been made after conflicts between Muhammad and certain Jewish groups escalated.

=== Islam’s connections to Judaism ===
The Qur’an reflects a cultural and religious heritage influenced by Judaism. Many Qur’anic stories about figures such as Moses, Joseph, and David align with Jewish midrashic traditions rather than directly with the Tanakh. Islamic concepts like zakāt (almsgiving), salāt (prayer), and nabī (prophet) have roots in Hebrew and Aramaic, indicating linguistic and theological connections. “Islam and Judaism shared another fundamental worldview: both religions were from the beginning religions where practice, religious law, and ritual purity are central.”

=== Conflicts and expulsions ===
Over time, tensions between Muhammad and certain Jewish tribes grew. The Banu Qaynuqa were expelled after a confrontation, while the Banu Nadir were forced to leave following accusations of conspiring against Muhammad. The Banu Qurayza, accused of allying with Muhammad’s Meccan enemies, faced the harshest fate: the men were executed, and the women and children were enslaved. This period was characterized by “a fateful and sometimes fatal conflict with Islam.”

=== Jewish communities after conflict ===
Even after the expulsion and subjugation of several Jewish tribes, Jewish communities persisted in other regions of Arabia. In Khaibar, Jews remained under treaty agreements, provided they paid an annual capitulation tax (Jizya). Some Jewish groups migrated to the Holy Land, while others maintained connections with Jewish intellectual and religious centers in Babylonia and Palestine. These events illustrate the diverse outcomes of Muhammad’s interactions with Jewish communities, ranging from conflict to coexistence under negotiated terms.

=== Reflections in the Qur’an ===
The Qur’an provides insight into Muhammad’s encounters with Arabian Jews. It refers to Jewish practices and beliefs while addressing specific disagreements, such as claims about Ezra being regarded as a "son of God" or critiques of mystical practices. Shared ethical values and practices, such as the laws of kashrut, reflect the broader religious context in which Islam emerged.

== During the caliphates ==
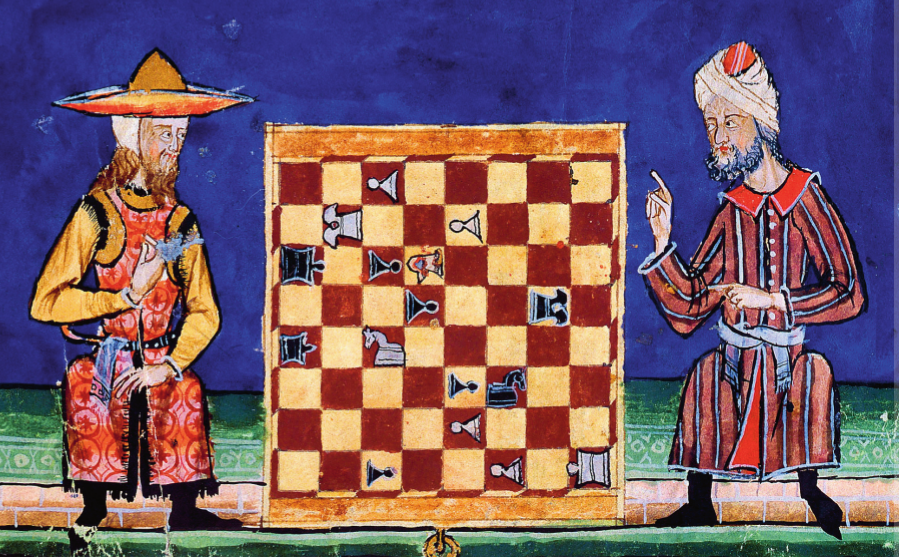
A Jew and a Muslim playing chess in 13th century al-Andalus in the Libro de los juegos

Leon Poliakov wrote that Jews in Medina could freely practice their own teachings so long as they respected and paid tributes towards Muslims under the Pact of Umar.

=== Jews and Muslims in the eastern islamic world (7th–13th centuries) ===
For much of the medieval period, Jews were treated as equals by Muslims due to their similarities shared in both religion's central monotheistic theme and scriptures. The Charter of Medina was then issued by Muhammad to create an interreligious harmony between the two religions, following the Muslims relocation to Medina. Strife between the two however replaced replaced the charter by recognizing Jews as dhimmis.

==== Conquests and governance ====
Following the Islamic conquests of the 7th century, the Rashidun, Umayyad, and Abbasid caliphates conquered many regions with significant Jewish population strecthing from Spain (specifically Toledo, Córdoba, Granada) and North Africa. Jewish aspects of life including political, legal, social, economic, and cultural were improved. Jews were granted second-class citizenship in these areas, given rights and protection (for a pay of jizya), and able to practice freely.

==== Migration and urbanization ====
Jewish populations shifted, increasingly toward urban centers, driven in part by economic opportunities and the imposition of land taxes (kharāj) on non-Muslims. "Urbanization itself thus made life for peasants more difficult, and ultimately, the burden of subsistence farming and the increasing viability of earning a livelihood through crafts and trade encouraged many to move to towns and cities".

==== Integration with urban elites ====
Jewish professionals often occupied urban professions, including roles as merchants, scholars, and courtiers. By the 10th century, Jewish elites played significant roles in commerce and administration. "The cities of the Islamic Empire became centers of territorial bureaucracies, and interurban links themselves tended to encourage geographic mobility and the tighter integration of the elites". Social integration allowed Jews to make great advances in new fields, including mathematics, astronomy, philosophy, chemistry and philology, with some even gaining political power under Islamic rule. For example, the vizier of Baghdad entrusted his capital to Jewish bankers, Jews were put in charge of certain parts of maritime and slave trade, and Siraf, the principal port of the caliphate in the 10th century, had a Jewish governor. Jews who moved to Muslim lands found themselves free to engage in any profession, resulting in less stigma than in Europe where such restrictions were still in force.

==== The role of the yeshivot ====
Under Islamic rule, the rabbinic academies in Mesopotamia (Sura and Pumbedita) rose to prominence as centers of Jewish learning, governance, and law. The geonim (heads of these academies) corresponded with Jewish communities across the empire, standardizing religious practices and legal interpretations. "Thousands of surviving letters, legal responsa, and copies of sections of the Babylonian Talmud sent throughout the Mediterranean basin attest to the influence the yeshivot developed outside their immediate geographic orbit".

==== Linguistic and literary advances ====
Arabic became the lingua franca for Jews in the Islamic world, often written in Hebrew script as Judeo-Arabic. "For Jews, Arabic took the form of Judeo-Arabic, a range of Arabic registers and dialects written in Hebrew characters that served as a koine, enabling Jews across vast distances to communicate with each other".

==== Innovations in written culture ====
The introduction of paper and the codex revolutionized Jewish textual traditions. The Abbasid Caliphate’s promotion of papermaking enabled the widespread production of books and documents. "Paper totally transformed written culture all over the Islamic world... By the mid-tenth century it had become the preferred medium for both everyday and scholarly writing in the Islamic world".

==== Taxation and economic policies ====
Islamic taxation policies, including the kharāj (land tax) and jizya, influenced Jewish economic activities. While these taxes placed financial burdens on non-Muslims, they also incentivized urban migration and engagement in trade and crafts. "The kharāj was a collective tax, and that meant that when individuals fled to cities, they increased the tax burden on those who remained behind".

==== Organization of communities ====
Jewish communities under Islamic rule were organized along religious lines, with local leaders overseeing communal affairs. These leaders, often titled muqaddam or ra’īs al-yahūd (head of the Jews), managed taxation, charity, and legal disputes. They also served as intermediaries between the Jewish community and Islamic authorities. "The Jewish communities distributed charity, ransomed captives, collected taxes and fees, adjudicated disputes through a system of courts and legal specialists, and elected and appointed leaders".

==== The role of the geonim ====
The geonim of Mesopotamia and Palestine were central figures in Jewish religious life. They provided guidance on religious practices, resolved disputes, and maintained connections with Jewish communities across the Islamic world. "Responsa came to constitute the primary literary output of the yeshivot and their most important means of contact with their followers".

==== Political fragmentation ====
The decline of the Abbasid Caliphate and the rise of regional powers, such as the Fatimids and Umayyads, reshaped the political landscape of the Islamic world. This fragmentation impacted Jewish communities, shifting centers of Jewish life to new regions, including Egypt and al-Andalus. "Paradoxically, [political fragmentation] furthered [cultural unification], for one main reason: the crisis in the Iraqi heartland sent waves of migrants westward, and those migrants brought Iraqi customs and culture with them".

==== Anti-Jewish legislation ====
While Jews generally experienced tolerance under Islamic rule, periods of political instability and economic decline occasionally led to discriminatory policies.

==== Cultural influence - Sanctity of Jerusalem ====
In early Islamic history, some Muslim scholars viewed the sanctification of Jerusalem as a possible Judaizing influence, introduced by Jewish converts like Kaʿb al-Aḥbār. A well-known anecdote recorded by Ṭabarī depicts Caliph ʿUmar rebuking Kaʿb for suggesting the Rock as the site of Muslim prayer, accusing him of following Jewish traditions. This reflects an early resistance among theologians who rejected Jerusalem's sanctity in Islam, considering it a deviation from the exclusive focus on Mecca. Such views, however, gradually lost prominence. Over time, particularly following the Crusades and later European interventions, Jerusalem’s status as Islam’s third holiest city became widely accepted.

=== Jews during Fatimid rule (909–1171) ===
The Fatimid Caliphate (909–1171), an Isma'ili Shia dynasty that ruled over North Africa, Egypt, and parts of the Levant, significantly influenced Jewish communities within their territory. The Fatimids, particularly under Caliph al-Mu'izz li-Din Allah (r. 953–975) and his successors, generally adopted a policy of tolerance toward non-Muslims, including Jews, in accordance with the dhimma system, which granted them legal protection in exchange for a special tax (jizya).

==== Political fragmentation and migration ====
By the mid-tenth century, the Abbasid Caliphate faced military and fiscal crises, leading to political fragmentation. The rise of the Fatimids further destabilized Abbasid authority, and by 969, they had conquered Egypt, shifting the center of Islamic power westward. This had significant consequences for Jewish communities, as migration from Iraq to Egypt increased, spreading Iraqi Jewish customs and traditions westward. Jewish communities in Egypt and Palestine absorbed cultural influences from Iraq, creating a more unified Jewish identity across Fatimid territories.

Egypt’s economic and political rise under the Fatimids made it a desirable destination for merchants, scholars, and state officials. By the twelfth century, Fustat and Cairo had become the most important Jewish centers in the east, rivaling the Iberian Peninsula in the west. The arrival of Maimonides in Egypt around 1165 marked the culmination of this shift, as he became the de facto leader of Egyptian Jewry and one of the most influential Jewish scholars of the Middle Ages.

==== Jewish life in Egypt and trade networks ====
During the Fatimid period, Egypt became a major center of Jewish life. Cairo, especially the area around Fustat, housed a vibrant Jewish community engaged in trade, crafts, and administrative roles. Jewish merchants, particularly those involved in long-distance commerce, benefited from the security and stability provided by the Fatimid state. The Geniza documents from the Ben Ezra Synagogue in Fustat reveal extensive Jewish participation in Mediterranean trade networks, with correspondence between merchants in Egypt, North Africa, and even India.

One of the most notable Jewish merchant groups of this period were the Radhanites, who operated extensive trade networks spanning from Western Europe to China. Described in the ninth century by the Abbasid geographer Ibn Khurradadhbih, the Radhanites were multilingual and traded in luxury goods, including slaves, furs, textiles, weapons, and spices. While their presence predated Fatimid rule, Jewish merchants in Fatimid territories continued to play a crucial role in international trade, as evidenced by later Geniza documents. The Fatimid conquest of Egypt and the shift of the Islamic economic center westward further strengthened Jewish participation in commerce, as Cairo became a key hub in Mediterranean and Indian Ocean trade.

The Fatimid court occasionally appointed Jews to high-ranking positions. Yaqub ibn Killis, a Jewish convert to Islam, became vizier under Caliph al-Aziz Billah (r. 975–996) and played a crucial role in state administration. Despite these opportunities, Jews, like other dhimmis, faced occasional persecution. Under Caliph al-Hakim bi-Amr Allah (r. 996–1021), harsher policies were briefly implemented, including the destruction of synagogues and restrictions on religious practice, though these measures were later reversed.

The Jewish community in Fatimid lands was closely linked to the academies in Iraq. The heads of the Babylonian yeshivot (geonim) maintained extensive correspondence with Jewish communities in Egypt, providing legal and religious guidance. The position of nagid (leader of the Jewish community) emerged in Egypt under Fatimid rule, consolidating Jewish leadership within the empire.

=== The Jews in Al-Andalus (711–1492) ===
The Jewish communities of al-Andalus thrived during the period of Muslim rule on the Iberian Peninsula, particularly between the reign of Abd al-Rahman III (912–961) and the Almohad conquest after 1140. This era, often referred to as a "Golden Age," saw an unprecedented flourishing of Jewish culture, intellectual life, and political influence. Despite earlier persecution under the Visigoths, when Jews "lived in great social and legal insecurity" and faced forced conversions, the Jews of al-Andalus embraced Arab culture and language, enabling their integration and the development of a rich literary tradition. This unification under Arabic culture, "constituted a fundamental change" that facilitated communication and cooperation among Jewish communities and strengthened their cohesion.

Prominent Jewish figures held high-ranking positions in political and economic spheres, with some serving as viziers, diplomats, and advisors to Muslim rulers. Hasdai ibn Shaprut, described as "surpassing all the royal servants in his manners, intellectual discipline, subtlety, patience, and intelligence," played a key role in the Umayyad court, where he also contributed to the importation of Hebrew texts from the East.

Despite the significant achievements of Jewish communities in al-Andalus, episodes of persecution revealed the fragility of their position. The 1066 Granada massacre (the razing of the entire Jewish quarter in the Andalucian city of Granada) marked a particularly violent moment when Joseph ha-Nagid, a prominent Jewish vizier, was assassinated. This event led to widespread looting and the killing of many members of the Jewish community. Similarly, the Almohad dynasty’s rise in the mid-12th century imposed forced conversions to Islam, causing many Jews to flee to Christian territories in the north or to Islamic regions such as Morocco and Tunisia. According to some Arabic sources, even those who converted faced suspicion and were required to wear distinctive clothing to identify themselves. The philosopher Maimonides, one of the most notable Jewish figures of the era, was among those who emigrated during this period, epitomizing the broader Jewish diaspora prompted by these events. In 1465, a mob enraged by stories about the behavior of a Jewish vizier killed many of the Jews and the Sultan himself. The community was temporarily converted but soon reverted to Judaism.

In al-Andalus, Jews contributed to scholarship, literature, and governance. Scholars like Yehuda Halevi and Shlomo ibn Gabirol played pivotal roles in bridging Jewish and Islamic traditions. "The Hebrew language could not isolate itself from the cultural world in which it was located," indicating the influence of Arab-Muslim culture on Jewish thought and literature.

The Jewish aristocracy in al-Andalus also mirrored the manners and values of their Muslim counterparts, participating in poetry contests, composing qasidas in Hebrew, and engaging in intellectual debates. Grammarians and philologists, such as Yehuda Hayyuj, made groundbreaking advances by applying Arabic linguistic principles to Hebrew, which enriched the understanding of biblical texts.

=== Almohad (1121–1269) persecution of Jews in north Africa ===
The Almohad Caliphate, ruling parts of North Africa and the Iberian Peninsula during the 12th and 13th centuries, subjected Jewish communities to widespread persecution. Under Almohad rule, synagogues were destroyed, Jewish practices were outlawed, and forced conversions to Islam were imposed. Almohad chronicler ʿAbd al-Wāḥid al-Marrākushī noted that “no church or synagogue is to be found in the entire Maghreb” and described Jews outwardly practicing Islam while secretly maintaining their faith at home.

Jewish sources provide a mixed perspective on these events. While some, such as Abraham Ibn Daʾūd, depict the Almohad persecutions as a program of mass forced conversion, others, like Maimonides, suggest that these conversions often involved verbal declarations that did not deeply disrupt Jewish life. In his Epistle on Martyrdom, Maimonides described forced conversions as superficial and advised Jews to preserve their faith secretly rather than face martyrdom. However, Mark R. Cohen, claims that “Maimonides’s famous statement “[n]o nation has ever done more harm to Israel” than Islam [...] reflects the great sage’s own recent experience of Almohad persecution in his native Spain and Morocco.”

The persecutions led to significant theological reflections within the Jewish community. While earlier Islamic regimes were relatively tolerant, the Almohad period marked a profound shift, forcing Jews to reconsider their relationship with Islam and their theological understandings of suffering. Some, like Joseph Ibn ʿAqnīn, regarded the Almohad era as one of the most devastating periods in Jewish history, and he argued for migration to more tolerant lands as a solution.

== Early modern period ==
=== Ottoman Empire ===
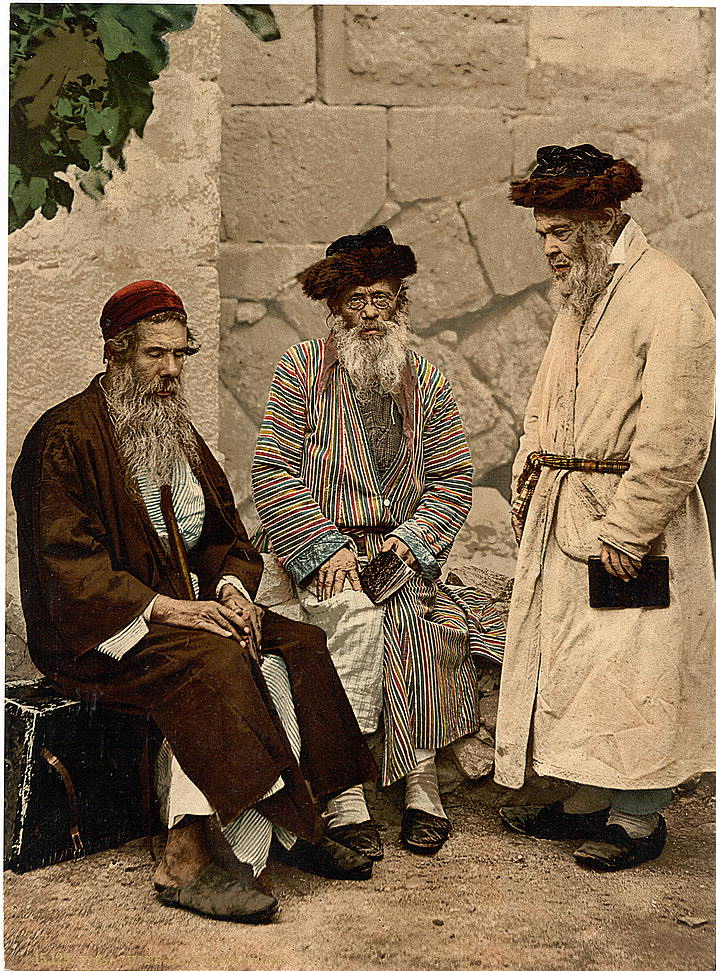
Photochrom of Jews in Jerusalem, in the 1890s.

The Ottoman Empire served as a refuge for Jewish refugees from the Spanish Empire, especially after the fall of Muslim Spain and the imposition of the Edict of Expulsion in 1492. This continued through the Roman Catholic Inquisition, as secret Jews and forced converts continued to flee Spain. The Maghreb from North Africa similarly found refuge among the Ottomans, as large Arabian cities created their own restrictive Jewish quarters (Mellahs).

In 1834, in Safed, Ottoman Syria, local Muslim Arabs carried out a massacre of the Jewish population known as the Safed Plunder.

In 1840, the Jews of Damascus were falsely accused by Christians of having murdered a Christian monk and his Muslim servant and of having used their blood to bake Passover bread. A Jewish barber was tortured until he "confessed"; two other Jews who were arrested died under torture, while a third converted to Islam to save his life. After the Damascus affair, the Ottoman Empire banned blood libel accusations. Most of the blood libel assucations were initiated by Greek Christians due to historical animosity between Greeks and Jews.

During the final chapter of the Ottoman Empire, increasing nationalism and economic hardship lead to anti-Jewish setiment in the region. In 1864, around 500 Jews were killed in Marrakesh and Fez in Morocco. In 1869, 18 Jews were killed in Tunis, and an Arab mob on Djerba Island looted and burned Jewish homes, stores, and synagogues. In 1875, 20 Jews were killed by a mob in Demnat, Morocco; elsewhere in Morocco, Jews were attacked and killed in the streets in broad daylight. In 1867, 1870, and 1897, synagogues were ransacked and Jews were murdered in Tripolitania.

==== Kurdistan ====
Jews lived in Kurdistan for thousands of years, before the final and mass migration in 1951–1952 to Israel. For many years, the Jews lived under the rule of the Turkish and Persian Empires and following World War I, they mainly lived in Iraq, Iran and Turkey, some Jews lived in Syria. Jews lived in many Kurdish urban centers such as Aqra, Dohuk, Arbil, Zakho, Sulaimaniya, Amadia, in Southern Kurdistan, in Saqiz, Bana and Ushno, in Eastern Kurdistan, in Jezira, Nisebin, Mardin and Diyarbakır in Turkey and Qamishle in North-Western Syria. Jews also lived in hundreds of villages in the rural and tribal area of Kurdistan, usually one or two Jewish families lived in a village, where they worked as weavers of traditional Kurdish clothing or they lived as tenants of the agha, the landlord or the head of the village.

=== Persia ===
In 1656, all Jews were expelled from Isfahan and forced to convert to Islam because of a common belief that their Jewishness was impure. However, as it became known that the converts continued to practice Judaism in secret and because the treasury suffered from the loss of jizya collected from the Jews, in 1661 they were allowed to revert to Judaism, although they were still required to wear a distinctive patch on their clothing.

In 1839, in the eastern Persian city of Meshed, a mob burst into the Jewish Quarter, burned the synagogue, and destroyed the Torah scrolls. The Jews themselves were violently forced to convert, narrowly avoiding complete massacre. There was another massacre in Barfurush in 1867. In 1839, the Allahdad incident, the Jews of Mashhad, Iran, now known as the Mashhadi Jews, were coerced into converting to Islam.

In the middle of the 19th century, J. J. Benjamin wrote of Persian Jews:

"…they are obliged to live in a separate part of town…; for they are considered as unclean creatures… Under the pretext of their being unclean, they are treated with the greatest severity and should they enter a street, inhabited by Mussulmans, they are pelted by the boys and mobs with stones and dirt… For the same reason, they are prohibited to go out when it rains; for it is said the rain would wash dirt off them, which would sully the feet of the Mussulmans… If a Jew is recognized as such in the streets, he is subjected to the greatest insults. The passers-by spit in his face, and sometimes beat him… unmercifully… If a Jew enters a shop for anything, he is forbidden to inspect the goods… Should his hand incautiously touch the goods, he must take them at any price the seller chooses to ask for them... Sometimes the Persians intrude into the dwellings of the Jews and take possession of whatever please them. Should the owner make the least opposition in defense of his property, he incurs the danger of atoning for it with his life... If... a Jew shows himself in the street during the three days of the Katel (Muharram)…, he is sure to be murdered."

=== Jews in central Asia under Muslim rule ===
The Jewish presence in Central Asia dates back to antiquity, predating the Islamic conquest of the region in the 8th century. The Bukharan Jews, a distinct Jewish community, primarily settled in major oasis cities such as Bukhara, Samarkand, Merv, Khiva, and Balkh, speaking a dialect of Judeo-Tajik, a variant of Judeo-Persian.

==== Status under Muslim rule ====
The Bukharan Jews lived under the dhimmi system, which granted them limited religious autonomy in exchange for the payment of the jizya tax. Their legal status was regulated by the emir of Bukhara, and they were led by a kalontar (Tajik) or nasi (Hebrew), who managed internal community affairs. While relations with the Hanafi Sunni Muslim majority were generally stable, Jews faced periodic discrimination and forced conversions, particularly in the 18th and 19th centuries. Converted Jews, known as Chala, formed a distinct community that retained Jewish customs despite officially identifying as Muslims

Jews were subject to several discriminatory regulations, including dress restrictions, bans on horse riding, and segregation into specific neighborhoods (mahallas). They were also often barred from holding certain professions but engaged in trade, artisan work, and medicine.

==== Impact of Russian expansion ====
The Russian conquest of Central Asia in the 19th century significantly altered the status of Bukharan Jews. Seeking allies against local Muslim rulers, Russian authorities granted Bukharan Jews a privileged legal status, allowing them to engage in commerce across the empire. This led to economic growth within the community, with some Jewish families, such as the Vodiaevs and Davidoffs, amassing considerable wealth in trade, textiles, and industry. By the late 19th century, Russian authorities began reversing some of these privileges due to economic and political tensions, leading to new restrictions on Jewish settlement and land ownership.

=== Zaydi Yemen ===
Under Zaydi rule, discriminatory laws which were imposed on the Yemenite Jews became more severe, eventually culminating in their exile, in what later became known as the Exile of Mawza. They were considered impure, and as a result, they were forbidden from touching a Muslim and they were also forbidden from touching a Muslim's food. They were obligated to humble themselves before a Muslim, they were also obligated to walk to the left side, and they were also required to greet him first. They could not build houses higher than a Muslim's house nor could they ride a camel or a horse, and while they were riding on a mule or a donkey, they had to sit sideways. As soon as a Jew entered the Muslim quarter, a Jew had to take off his foot-gear and walk barefoot. If he was attacked with stones or fists by Islamic youth, a Jew was not allowed to defend himself. In such situations, he had the option of fleeing or seeking intervention by a merciful Muslim passerby.

== Post-colonial era ==
=== Arab League ===
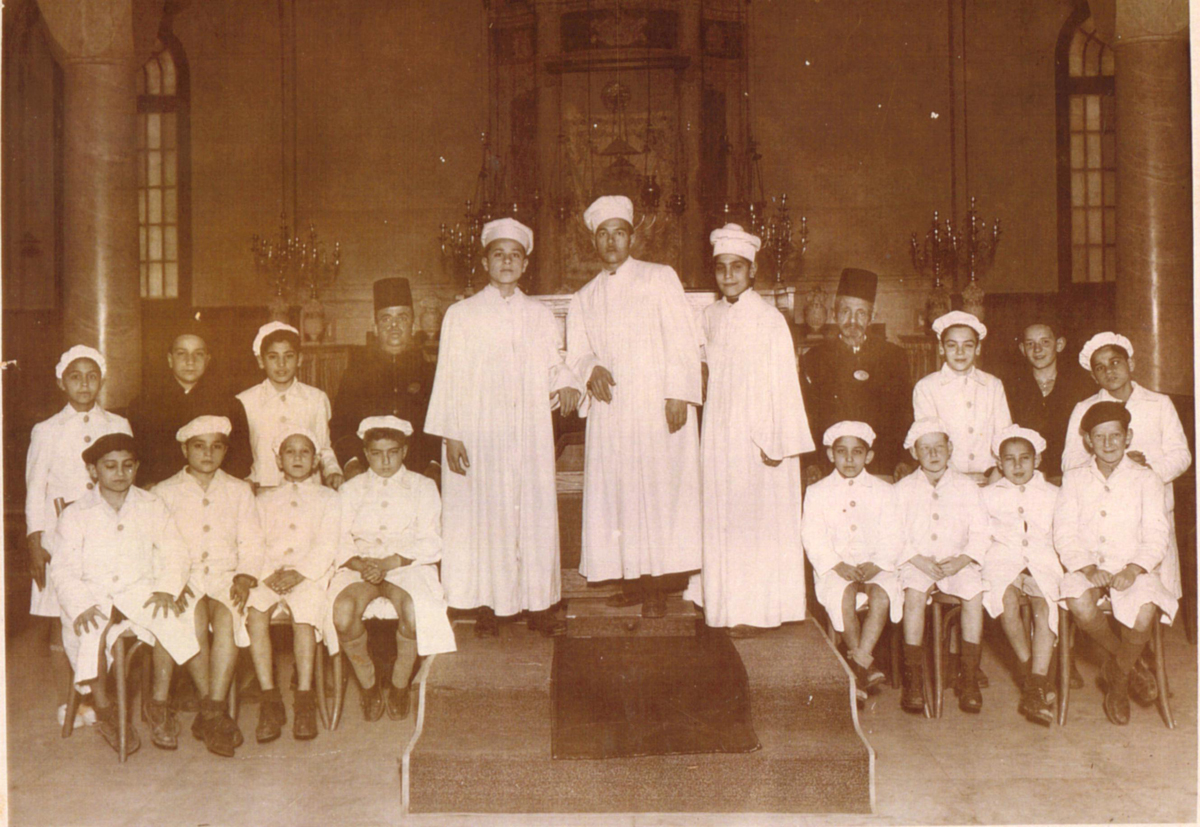
Choir of Rabbin Moshe Cohen in the Menasce synagogue, part of the Jewish community in Alexandria, Egypt.

Before the rise of Zionism, Jews lived in many Arab countries. In the early decades of independent Iraq and Egypt, Jews played an important role in society. The Jews held important positions such as administrators, bureaucrats and officers. They were pioneer in trade and commerce. Iraq's first minister of finance (Sassoon Eskell) was Jewish. In Egypt, Jews established some of the well-known companies.

By the mid-1970s the vast majority of Jews had left, fled or had been expelled from Arab and Muslim-majority countries, moving primarily to Israel, France and the United States. The reasons for the exodus are varied and disputed. In 1945, there were between 758,000 and 866,000 Jews living in communities throughout the Arab world. Today, there are fewer than 8,000. In some Arab states, such as Libya, which once had a Jewish population of around 3 percent (similar proportion as that of the United States today), the Jewish community no longer exists; in other Arab countries, only a few hundred Jews remain. However, in Libya, the Jewish community declined due to French colonialism.

In Iraq and Syria, which were ruled by the Ba'ath Party, Jews were treated well by the government. The government of these countries tried to present a number of members of other minorities and raise their status, in order to hide the abhorrent sectarian nature of its rule, and show the world that it is a secular nationalist who believes in pluralism, protects these minorities, ensures their safety and continued existence, and encourages their integration into society. However, their population continued to decline, as Jews seized opportunities to travel and settling abroad.

The largest communities of Jews in Muslim countries exist in the non-Arab countries of Iran (9,500) and Turkey (14,500); both, however, are much smaller than they historically have been. But, possibly there are more. Among Arab countries, the largest Jewish community now exists in Morocco with about 2,000 Jews and in Tunisia with about 1,000. The Jews in these countries are well-integrated in society. Hundreds of Jews are also found in Lebanon, Yemen, Syria, Algeria and Iraq.

=== Imperial Iran and the Islamic Republic ===
Judaism is the second-oldest religion which still exists in Iran after Zoroastrianism. About one-third of the some 120,000-150,000 Iranian Jews in the mid-20th century fled the country during the 1950s, as a consequence of political instability. Most of the remaining 80,000-100,000 Jews fled during and following the Islamic Revolution of 1979. Today, the largest groups of Persian Jews are found in Israel (236,000-360,000 in 2014, including second-generation Israelis) and the United States (45,000, especially in the Los Angeles area, home to a large concentration of expatriate Iranians). There are also smaller communities in Western Europe.

By various estimates, between 8,000 and 10,000 Jews remain in Iran, mostly in Tehran and Hamedan. While other sources suggest the population ranges between 15,000 and 35,000. Just like other parts of the Arab and Muslim world, many Jews distance themselves from census. The Jews are recognized the government of Iran as a minority and have a reserved seat in the parliament. Though just like other minorities, Jews are not allowed to go for higher ministerial positions. But the elected representative can hold positions within the parliamentary committees. The Jews have also gained recognition for their achievement in different areas and participated in society even at international levels.

=== Other countries ===
Unlike India's Mumbai and Kolkata, Pakistan had small but thriving Jewish community, numbering around 7,000. Many of them fled after the establishment of Israel. The community dwindled time to time. According to a survey in the early 2000s, around 1,000 Jews lived in Pakistan. Among them, 12 Jews hold government jobs and Jews were also registered as voters in elections. Today around 200 Jews live in Pakistan.

== See also ==
- Bukharan Jews
- Golden age of Jewish culture in Spain
- History of the Jews in Africa
- History of the Jews in the Arabian Peninsula
- Islamic–Jewish relations
- Jewish exodus from the Muslim world
- Maghrebi Jews
- Mizrahi Jews
- Mountain Jews
- Musta'arabi Jews
- Persian Jews
- Sephardic Jews
- Ashkenazi Jews
