= Mohamed Abdul Salam Mahgoub =

Egyptian politician (1935–2022)

Egyptian Minister of Local Development
- In office 27 August 2006 – 2011?
- President: Husni Mubarak
- Prime Minister: Ahmed Nazif

Governor of Alexandria Governorate
- In office 1997–2006
- President: Husni Mubarak
- Prime Minister: Kamal Ganzouri; Atef Ebeid; Ahmed Nazif
- Succeeded by: Adel Labib

Governor of Ismailia Governorate
- In office 1994–1997
- President: Husni Mubarak
- Prime Minister: Atef Sedky; Kamal Ganzouri

Personal details
- Born: 1935 Dakahlia Governorate, Egypt
- Died: 31 January 2022 (aged 86)
- Party: National Democratic Party
- Education: Egyptian Military Academy
- Occupation: Soldier, military attaché
- Website: (in Arabic) www.almahgoub2010.com (2010 People's Assembly campaign website)

Military service
- Allegiance: Egypt
- Branch/service: Egyptian Army
- Rank: Colonel

Colonel Mohamed Abdul Salam Mahgoub (Arabic: محمد عبد السلام المحجوب, Muḥammad `Abdul-Salām al-Maḥgūb) (1935 – 31 January 2022) was an Egyptian politician. Through 2006 to his death, he was the Minister of Local Development in the Cabinet of Egypt. He was previously Governor of Alexandria Governorate, his term expiring upon his appointment to the Cabinet.

Mahgoub was born in Dakahlia Governorate in 1935. Prior to entering politics, Maghoub had been an officer of the Egyptian Army, having graduated from the Egyptian Military Academy in 1955 with a degree in military science. He was assigned as military attaché in several Egyptian embassies around the world prior to being appointed Vice-Chair of National Security in 1992. He subsequently served as Governor of Ismaïlia prior to being reassigned to Alexandria in 1997.

He was seeking election to the People's Assembly for the District of al-Raml in Alexandria. He sought to replace the retiring Sobhy Saleh Moussa Abu Amer.

Mahgoub died on 31 January 2022, at the age of 86.

== See also ==
- Timeline of Alexandria, 1990s–2000s
