= Sasson Synagogue =

Former synagogue in Alexandria, Egypt

Religion
- Affiliation: Judaism (former)
- Ecclesiastical or organizational status: Synagogue
- Status: Closed

Location
- Location: Rue Temple Sasson, Glymenopoulo, Alexandria
- Country: Egypt

Architecture
- Funded by: Jacob Sassoon
- Completed: 1910

The Sasson Synagogue, officially the Jacob Sasson Synagogue, is a former Jewish synagogue, that was located on Rue Temple Sasson, in the Glymenopoulo neighborhood of Alexandria, Egypt. The synagogue was completed in 1910 and, despite its misspelling, was named in honour of Jacob Sassoon.

== See also ==
- History of the Jews in Egypt
- List of synagogues in Egypt
