= Mohammed Feiter Building =

Building in Alexandria, Egypt

Coordinates: 31.198300°N 29.900800°E

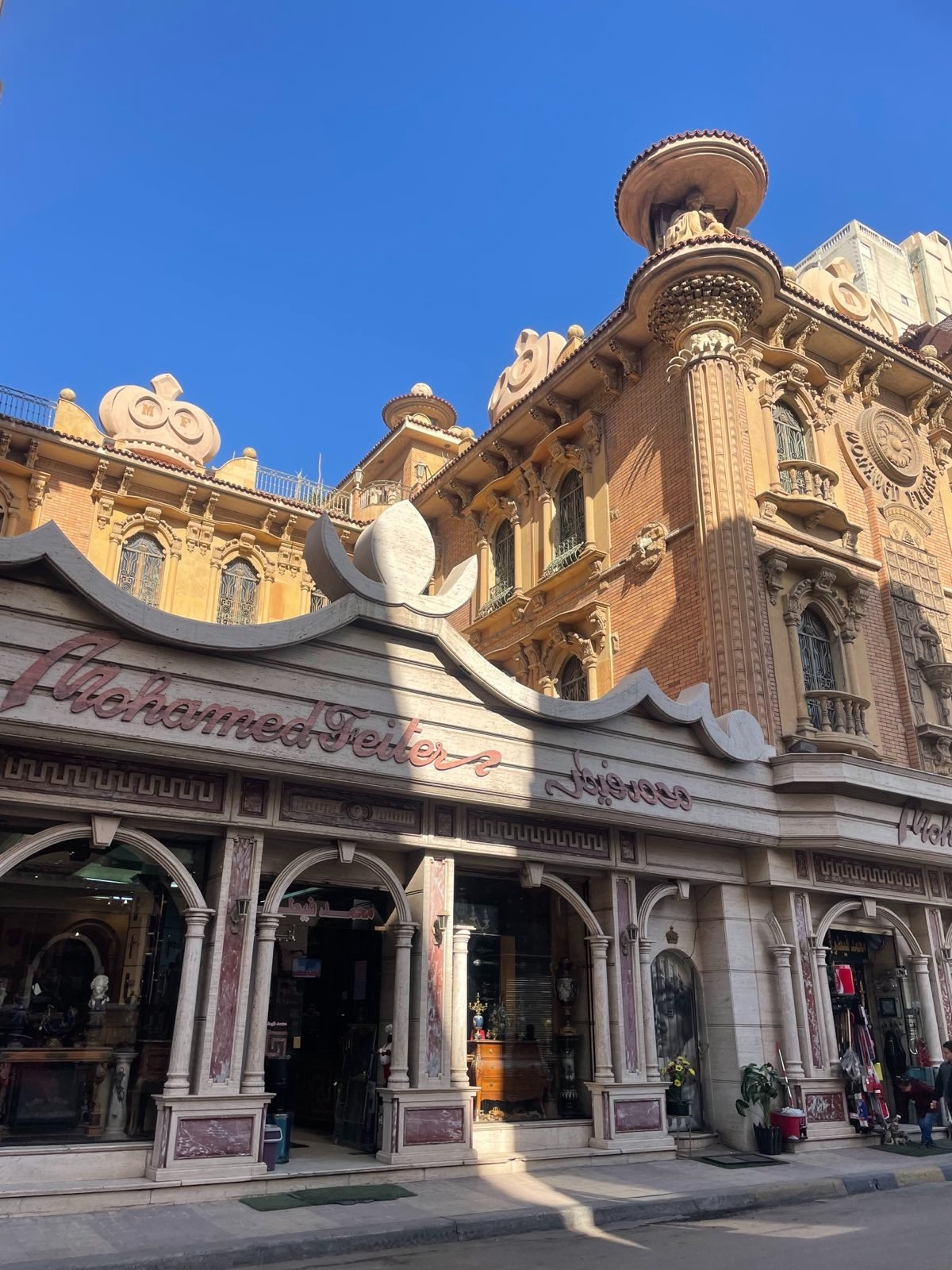
Photograph of the Mohammed Feiter Building in Alexandria

Mohammed Feiter Building is a building built in the early 20th century on Istanbul Street, Alexandria, Egypt. It is close to Cavafy Museum and Eliyahu Hanavi Synagogue. It was built by a Greek resident of Egypt. It was sold to Mohammed Feiter, a tenant of the building, in 1965, following the Egyptian Greek Exodus from Egypt. The facade was rebuilt by Mohammed Feiter, partially inspired by Italian architecture and Harrods, the department store in London. The building is decorated with Mohammed Feiter's initials, "M. F".

The building is currently managed by a son of Mohammed Feiter and contains an antique store.
