= Beit Aharon Synagogue =

Demolished synagogue in Cairo, Egypt

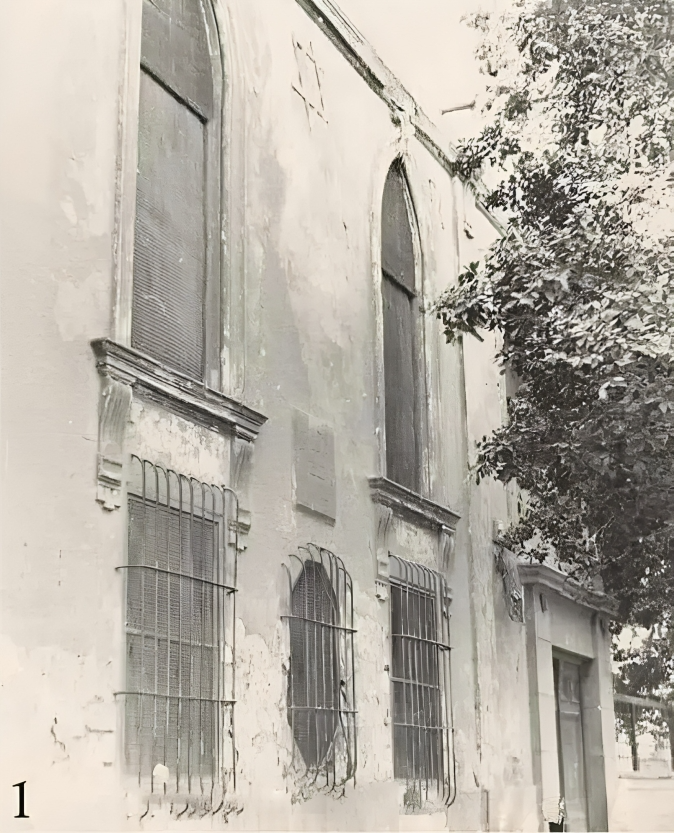
- The former synagogue façade, in 1919

- Location of the former synagogue, relative to the Nile Delta

Religion
- Affiliation: Judaism (former)
- Rite: Nusach Sefard
- Ecclesiastical or organizational status: Synagogue (1892–1966)
- Status: Closed; demolished

Location
- Location: Abdul Rahman Street, Helwan, Cairo
- Country: Egypt
- Interactive map of Beit Aharon Synagogue
- Coordinates: 29°50′43″N 31°19′44″E

Architecture
- Architect: Felix Soares
- Type: Basilica
- Completed: 1892
- Demolished: 1995

The Beit Aharon Synagogue, or Beit Aharon Temple, also known as the Helwan Synagogue, was a Jewish synagogue, that was located on Abdul Rahman Street, in Helwan, Cairo, Egypt, and was the first synagogue in Khedival Cairo. The small building was established in 1892 as a center for the Jewish community.

It was last used for religious services in 1966, and it was sold and demolished in 1995.

== Background and history ==
The Mosiri family was a wealthy Jewish family who became prominent in the InterContinental, Menahouse Savoy, and San Stefano hotels through member David Mosiri. In 1885, he hired some Jewish workers from the Jewish Quarter in Cairo to work on the railway line between Bab al-Louq and Helwan. A number of these families settled in Helwan, which became an ideal shrine, also attracted a number of wealthy Jews and formed the Jewish community in Helwan, which in the 1940s reached about 70 families, and the first head of the sect in Helwan was Dawoud Musiri, followed by his son, Ibram.

=== Synagogue establishment ===
In 1892, Felix Soares established the Helwan Synagogue as a center for the Jewish community. It was a small temple whose location was on Abdul Rahman Street, the intersection of Abdullah Street today. The number of worshipers in the winter exceeded fifty men from Helwan's residents and visitors, but in the summer it was difficult for the number of worshipers in the temple to reach ten adult men due to the legality of performing prayers in the temple because many Jews left Helwan in the summer for the cities, especially coastal Ras El Bar.

=== Men of the synagogue ===
Among the clerics of the Helwan Synagogue were Shushan, the first rabbi of the sect, and Samuel Bizti, who was also the legal slaughterer of chickens for the sect, and the tax collector, Meyer Sabaoni and Al-Jabi Habib Vidal.

=== Talmud Torah School ===
In the early 1940s, Joseph and Esther Azoulay established a Torah Talmud school (Note: Jewish Torah Talmud schools are similar to Islamic schools and Christian Sunday schools.) near the temple. It had about fifty boys and girls, aged between 10 and 15. Subjects included the Jewish prayers, the study of Jewish festivals, hymns, and Hebrew. The children studied at the school on Sunday and Thursday of each week, and the rest of the week they studied at The Holy Family School.

=== Demolishing the temple ===
The school was closed in 1948, and the temple was last held in 1966. In 1995, the temple was sold and demolished. All that remained of it were a few marble slabs. They were transferred to Yad Ben Zvi Institute, a historical institute on the outskirts of Jerusalem.

== Architecture ==
The synagogue was established in 1892 in the Basilica style, like most Jewish synagogues. The upper balcony, which surrounded the prayer hall from three directions except the eastern side, which contains the temple, was used as a prayer hall for women. The Temple, which serves as the mizrah. The prayer hall is on the ground floor, and to the right of it is the platform in the middle of the hall, which is known as "Al-Mimbar," which is derived from the Arabic word "pulpit" (according to the Jewish Encyclopedia). The names of those who donated to build the temple were engraved in Hebrew and French on the "Mimar".

== Gallery ==
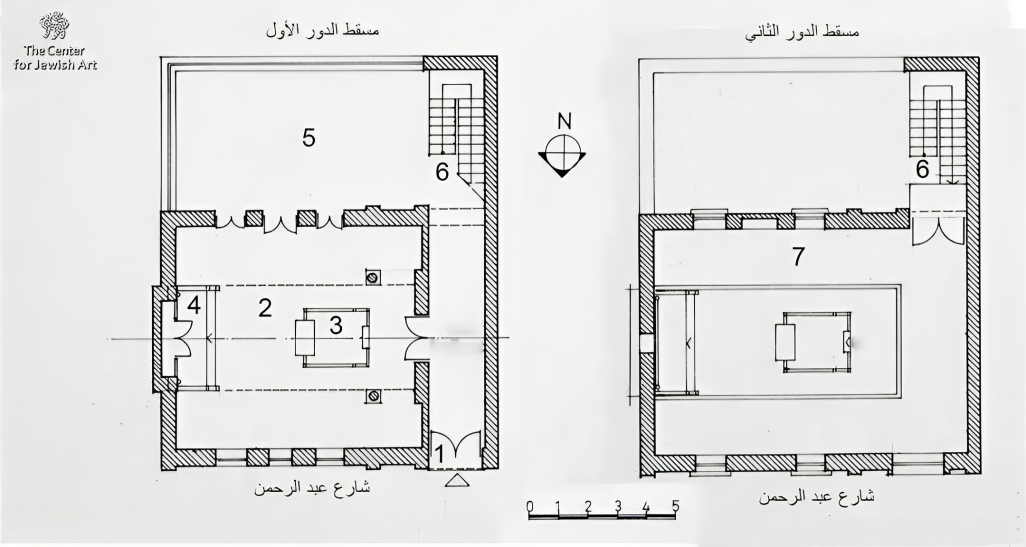

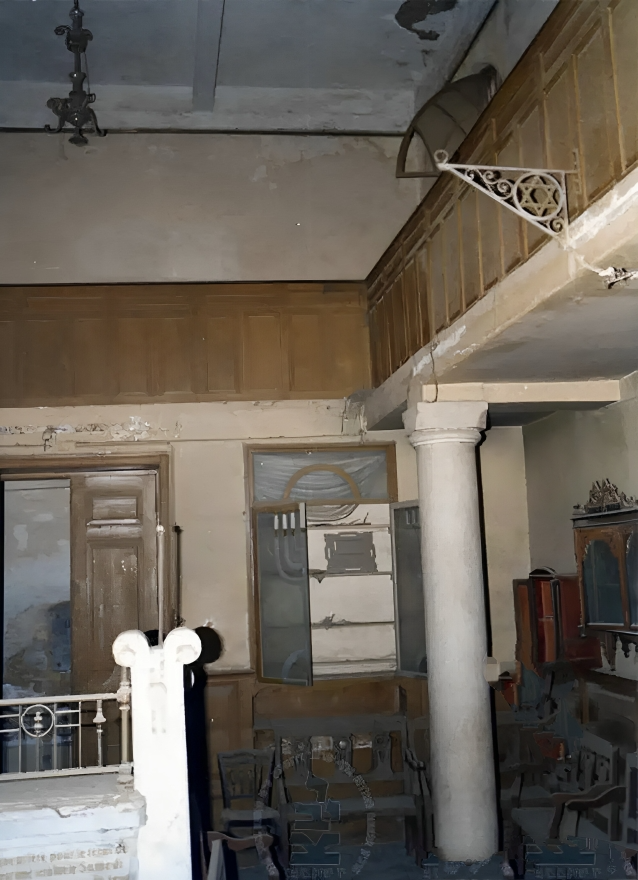

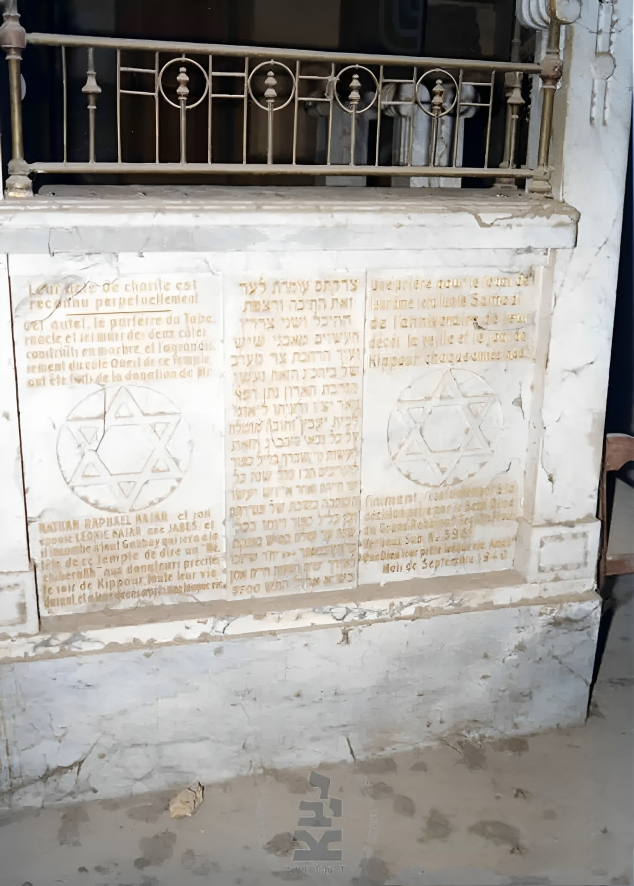

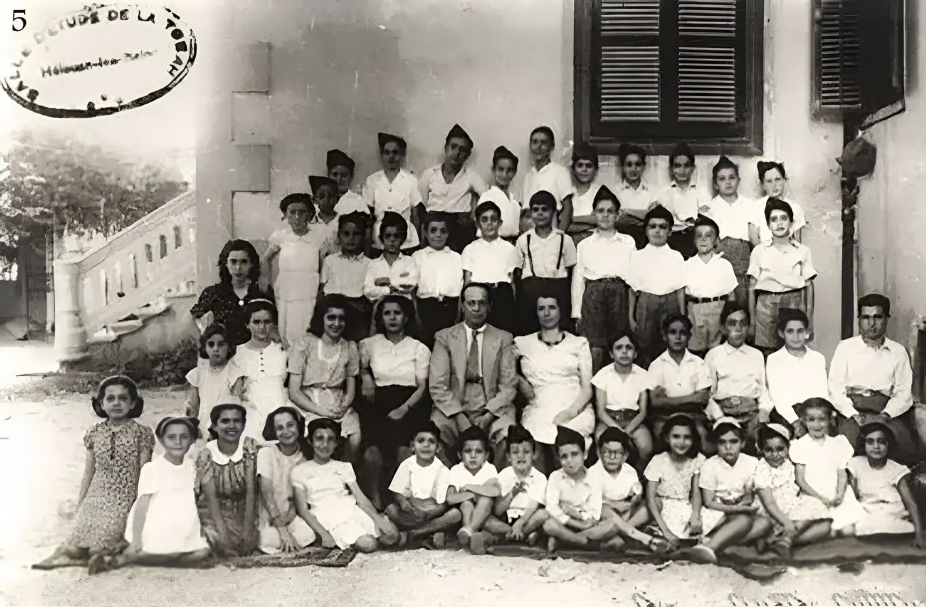
Talmud Torah School

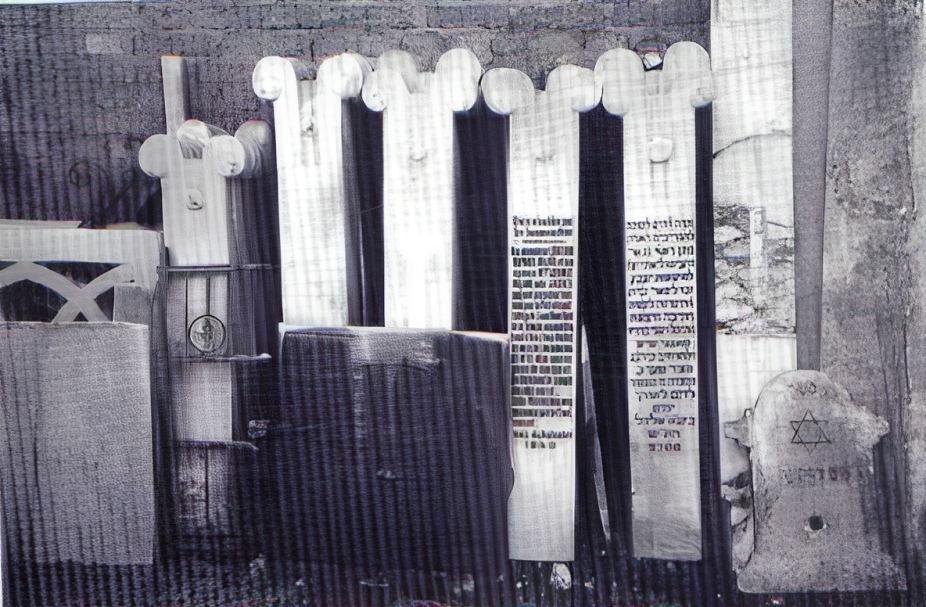
The remains of the temple when it was demolished were transferred to Jerusalem

== See also ==
- History of the Jews in Egypt
- List of synagogues in Egypt
