= Port Said International Schools =

Port Said International School Port Said Integrated Language School
- Port Said, Egypt

Information
- Type: Private
- Motto: International: Shaping Tomorrow by Teaching Today; National: Better Education for Future Generations
- Established: 2005
- Chairperson: Nadia Hafez(2005–2009); Ghada Attia(2009–)
- Director: International: Usama El-Beltagy; National: Ghada Attia
- Staff: International: 5 National: 6
- Teaching staff: International: 33 (in 9 departments); National: 44 (in 10 departments)
- Gender: Both
- Average class size: 15–28
- Education system: National or American
- Language: English, Arabic, French
- Sports: Swimming Handball, Football, Volleyball, Basketball, Gymnasium
- Website: http://www.portsaidinternationalschools.com

Port Said International Schools are two sister schools located in Port Said, Egypt. One offers national education and the other offers international education.

The national section is called Port Said Integrated Language School (from KG stage to grade 12).

The international section, which is called Port Said International School, offers American curriculum in all its grades. The school was opened for enrollment in May 2005.
