= List of synagogues in Egypt =

A list of synagogues in Egypt:

== Alexandria ==
- Azouz Synagogue
- Castro Synagogue
- Eliyahu Hanavi Synagogue
- Eliahou Hazan Synagogue
- Green Synagogue
- Menasce Synagogue
- Nezah Israel Synagogue
- Sasson Synagogue
- Shaaré Tefila Synagogue
- Zaradel Synagogue

== Cairo ==
- Beit Aharon Synagogue
- Ben Ezra Synagogue
- Ets Hayim Synagogue
- Haïm Capoussi Synagogue
- Ibn Maïmoun Synagogue
- Maimonides Synagogue
- Meir'enaim Synagogue
- Moussa Dar'i Synagogue
- Pahad Itzhak Synagogue
- Sha'ar Hashamayim Synagogue
- Vitali Madjar Synagogue
