= Ets Hayim Synagogue =

Former synagogue in Cairo, Egypt

Ets Hayim Synagogue (Kenisset Hanan)
- Hebrew: בית הכנסת עץ חיים (מצרים); Arabic: كنسة حنان
- Location of the former synagogue, relative to the Nile Delta

Religion
- Affiliation: Karaite Judaism (former)
- Rite: Nusach Sefard
- Ecclesiastical or organizational status: Synagogue (1900–1967)
- Status: Abandoned

Location
- Location: 3 Qantaret Street, Ghamrah, Daher, Cairo
- Country: Egypt
- Interactive map of Ets Hayim Synagogue (Kenisset Hanan)
- Administration: Ministry of Tourism and Antiquities
- Coordinates: 30°03′48″N 31°15′50″E

Architecture
- Completed: 1900

Specifications
- Interior area: 400 m^{2} (4,300 sq ft)
- Site area: 3,500 m^{2} (38,000 sq ft)

The Ets Hayim Synagogue (Hebrew: בית הכנסת עץ חיים (מצרים)), also known as the Etz Haim Synagogue, the Hanan Synagogue, the Baroukh Hanan Synagogue or the Kenisset Hanan (Arabic: كنسة حنان; French: Temple Hanan), is a former Karaite Jewish congregation and synagogue, located at 3 Qantaret Street, in the Ghamra neighborhood of Daher, in Cairo, Egypt. The synagoge was completed in 1900. The congregation worshipped in the Sephardic rite.

== History ==
Various sources attribute the building of the synagogue to Baroukh Hanan, or Hayim Hanan, or by Ibrahim (Abraham) Hanan, and named after Baroukh Hanan.

The 3,500 m^{2} (38,000 sq ft) synagogue compound also has a yeshiva, a communal sukkah, and a mikveh, although this has fallen into disrepair. Some of the marble flooring of the synagogue was damaged during the 1992 Cairo earthquake.

The synagogue is protected by the Egyptian Supreme Council of Antiquities, under Decree no. 2112 of 1973, and the synagogue is guarded by police.

According to Canadian-American architectural photographer, D.R. Cowles, the synagogue was last used was in 1967. Abandoned by the congregation, the site is administrated by the Ministry of Tourism and Antiquities.

== Notable former members ==
- Nagwa Salem (born Ninette Shalom), an Egyptian-Jewish actress

== See also ==
- History of the Jews in Egypt
- Synagogues in Cairo
- List of synagogues in Egypt
