= Castro Synagogue =

Former synagogue in Alexandria, Egypt

Religion
- Affiliation: Judaism (former)
- Ecclesiastical or organizational status: Synagogue (1920–????)
- Status: Closed

Location
- Location: Moharam Bey, Alexandria
- Country: Egypt

Architecture
- Founder: Moshe Castro
- Completed: 1920

The Castro Synagogue was a former Jewish synagogue, that was located in the Moharam Bey district of Alexandria, Egypt. The synagogue was founded by Moshe Castro, completed in 1920, and located in the district that contained the homes of many wealthy Jewish families.

== See also ==
- History of the Jews in Egypt
- List of synagogues in Egypt
- Azouz Synagogue
- Eliyahu Hanavi Synagogue
