= Nezah Israel Synagogue =

Former synagogue in Alexandria, Egypt

Religion
- Affiliation: Judaism (former)
- Rite: Nusach Ashkenaz
- Ecclesiastical or organizational status: Synagogue
- Status: Closed

Location
- Location: Alexandria
- Country: Egypt

Architecture
- Completed: 1920

The Nezah Israel Synagogue was a former Jewish congregation and synagogue, located in Alexandria, Egypt. The congregation, who worshiped in the Ashkenazi rite, completed the synagogue in 1920.

== See also ==
- History of the Jews in Egypt
- List of synagogues in Egypt
