= Port Said International School =

International school in Port Said, Egypt

Coordinates: 31.2492°N 32.2888°E

Information
- Established: May 2005; 20 years ago
- Teaching staff: c.60
- Grades: K-12
- Enrollment: c.900
- Language: English
- Accreditation: Cognia; Ministry of Education
- Affiliation: Port Said International Schools
- Website: pis.edu.eg

Port Said International School is the American Section of the Port Said International Schools in Port Said, Egypt. It is the first International School in Port Said and the first international school to be accredited by the Commission on International and Trans-Regional Accreditation (now known as Cognia) and fully licensed by the Egyptian Ministry of Education in the region. The school also hosts exchange students from different countries in the world.

== History ==
The school was opened for enrollment in May 2005, starting with a summer school. The first academic year was 2005–2006. The school was built and fully equipped by the Port Said Executive Office (part of Port Said Governorate). Management of the school was assigned to Nadia Hafez (Chairperson), who was responsible for providing management, teaching, administrative and supporting staff to run the school. The running of the school was assigned to Nicholas Florence in July 2005, then to Noha.

== Staff ==
The school has over 60 teachers as of 2025.

== Education ==
The school offers an American curriculum for Kindergarten to Grade 12. Its sister school, the Port Said Integrated Language School, offers an Egyptian curriculum for Kindergarten to Grade 12. The American school has over 900 students.
