= Eliahou Hazan Synagogue =

Former synagogue in Alexandria, Egypt

- Location of the former synagogue, relative to the Nile Delta

Religion
- Affiliation: Judaism (former)
- Ecclesiastical or organizational status: Synagogue (1937–1958)
- Status: Closed; sold

Location
- Location: Rue Belzoni, Alexandria
- Country: Egypt
- Interactive map of Eliahou Hazan Synagogue
- Coordinates: 31°13′17″N 29°56′01″E

Architecture
- Completed: 1937

The Eliahou Hazan Synagogue was a former Jewish synagogue, that was located on the former Rue Belzoni, in Alexandria, Egypt. The synagogue was named after Rabbi Eliahou Hazan, the chief rabbi of Alexandria from 1888 to 1908. Established in 1937, it closed in 1958. It, along with many other synagogues, was later sold by the Jewish community of Alexandria in 1995.

== See also ==
- History of the Jews in Egypt
- List of synagogues in Egypt
