= Menasce Synagogue =

Synagogue in Alexandria, Egypt

- Arabic: كنيس منشا
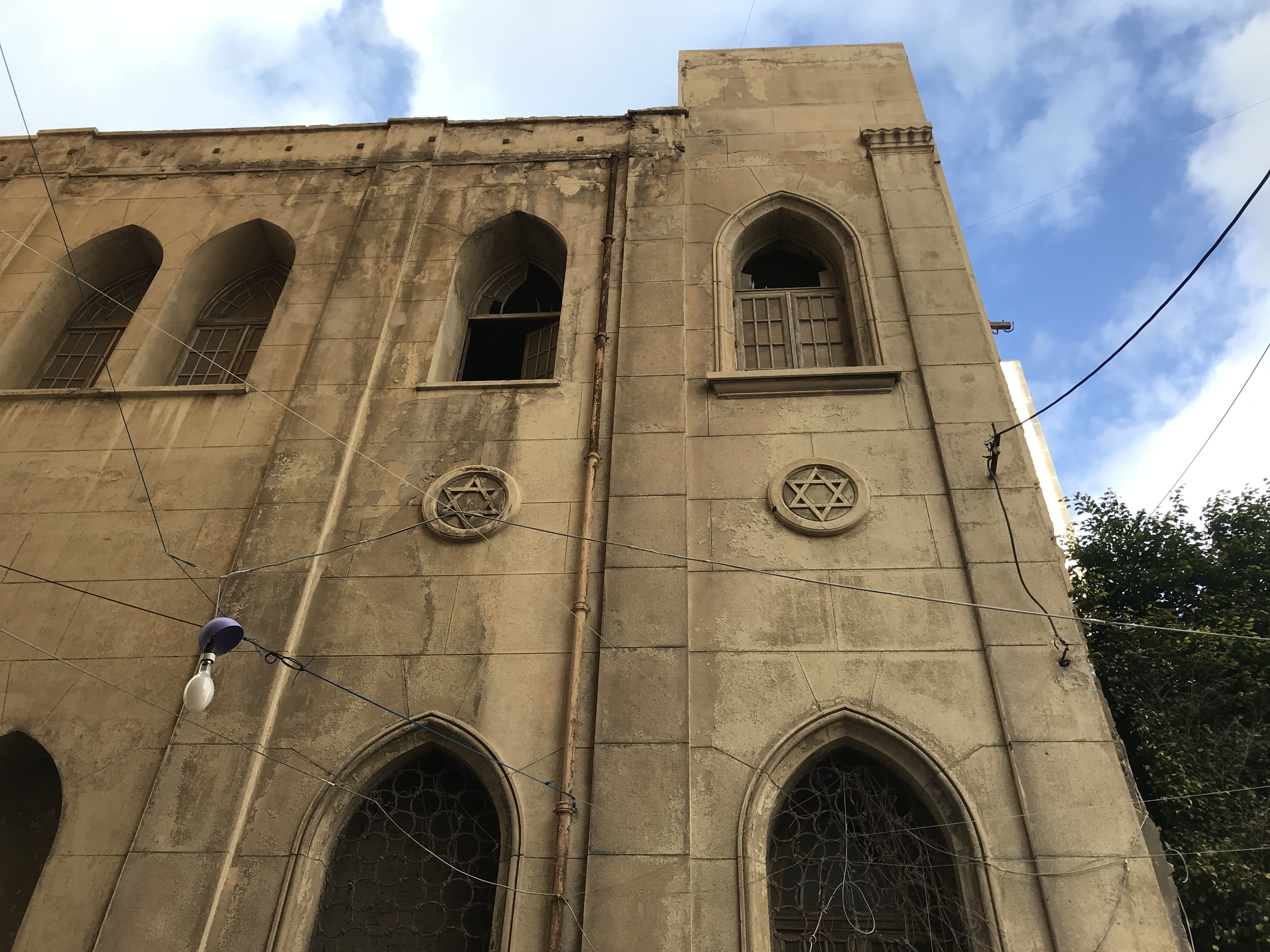
- The synagogue in 2021

- Location of the synagogue, relative to the Nile Delta

Religion
- Affiliation: Judaism
- Ecclesiastical or organizational status: Synagogue
- Status: Active

Location
- Location: Ahmed Orabi Square, Alexandria
- Country: Egypt
- Interactive map of Menasce Synagogue
- Coordinates: 31°11′56″N 29°53′37″E

Architecture
- Founder: Baron Jacob de Menasce
- Completed: 1872

The Menasce Synagogue (Arabic: كنيس منشا) is a Jewish synagogue, located in Ahmed Orabi Square, in Alexandria, Egypt.

== History ==
The synagogue was funded by the wealthy and powerful Menasce banking family of Alexandria, previously of Morocco and Palestine. The first member of the Menasce family in Egypt was Jacob Levi Menasce, born in Cairo in 1807, also known as Baron Jacob de Menasce. Menasce was elevated to the baronetcy by Austria-Hungarian Emperor Franz Josef when the emperor visited Egypt for the opening of the Suez Canal. Menasce later became president of the Cairo Jewish community. Menasce and his family moved in Alexandria in 1871 but developed a rift with the established Alexandrian Jewish community.

The separate synagogue that he founded, the Menasce Synagogue, opened to great fanfare on December 30, 1872, (Note: Quoted elsewhere as 1882; and 1860.) with the ceremony attended by the Ottoman Governor of Alexandria. Although the Alexandria coastline was bombed ten years later in the Anglo-Egyptian War, the synagogue survived intact.

In September 2017, Menasce Synagogue was added to Egypt's list of Islamic, Jewish, and Coptic monuments, protecting it from being torn down.

== See also ==
- History of the Jews in Egypt
- List of synagogues in Egypt
