= Glim =

Glim Glim جليم Gleam
- Location in Egypt
- Coordinates: 31.241866°N 29.961333°E
- Country: Egypt
- Governorate: Alexandria
- City: Alexandria
- Time zone: UTC+2 (EET)
  - Summer (DST): UTC+3 (EEST)

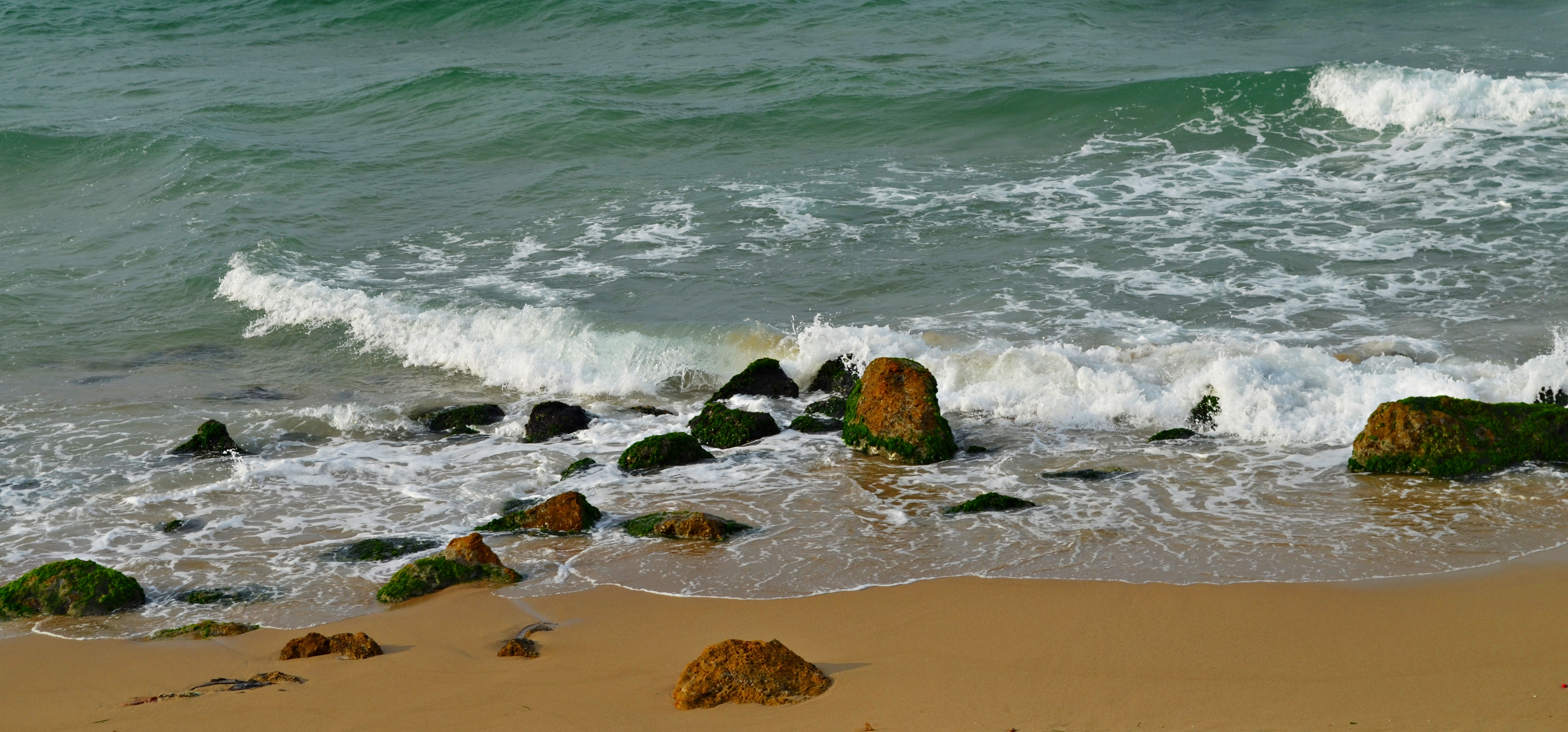
A beach in the Glime neighborhood

Glim or Gleam (Arabic: جليم) is a neighborhood in Alexandria, Egypt. Gleem is part of the East Alexandria district and contains the Faculty of Fine Arts, which has now been moved. It is close to San Stefano and has Gleem Beach, which is one of the famous beaches in Alexandria. The song of the artist Amr Diab in the movie Ice Cream in Gleem was filmed on its beach.

== See also ==
- Neighborhoods in Alexandria
