= Moharam Bek =

Moharam Bek محرم بك
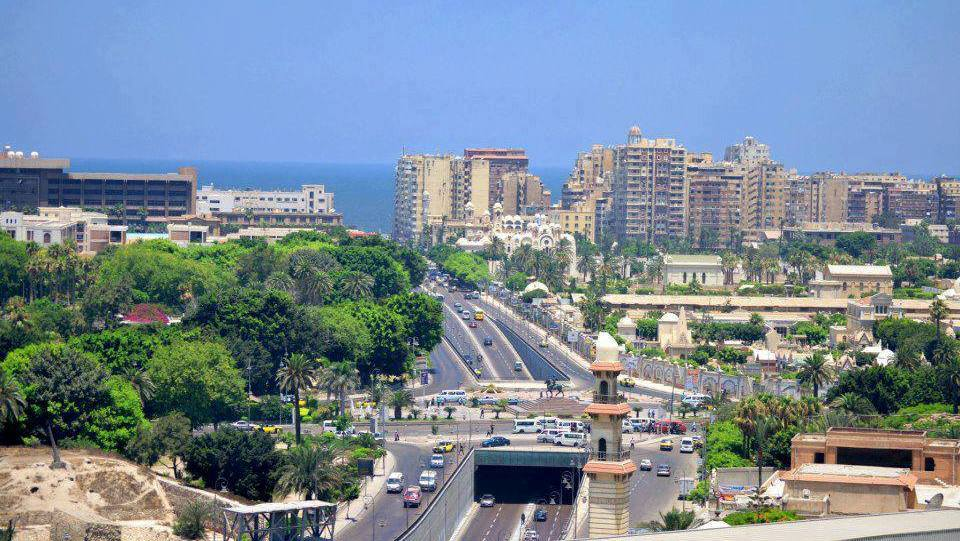

- Location in Egypt
- Coordinates: 31.191658°N 29.911773°E
- Country: Egypt
- Governorate: Alexandria
- City: Alexandria
- Time zone: UTC+2 (EET)
  - Summer (DST): UTC+3 (EEST)

Moharam Bek (Arabic: محرم بك) is a neighborhood in Alexandria, Egypt. It is known for the Alexandria Stadium, which sometimes hosts football games.

== Gallery ==
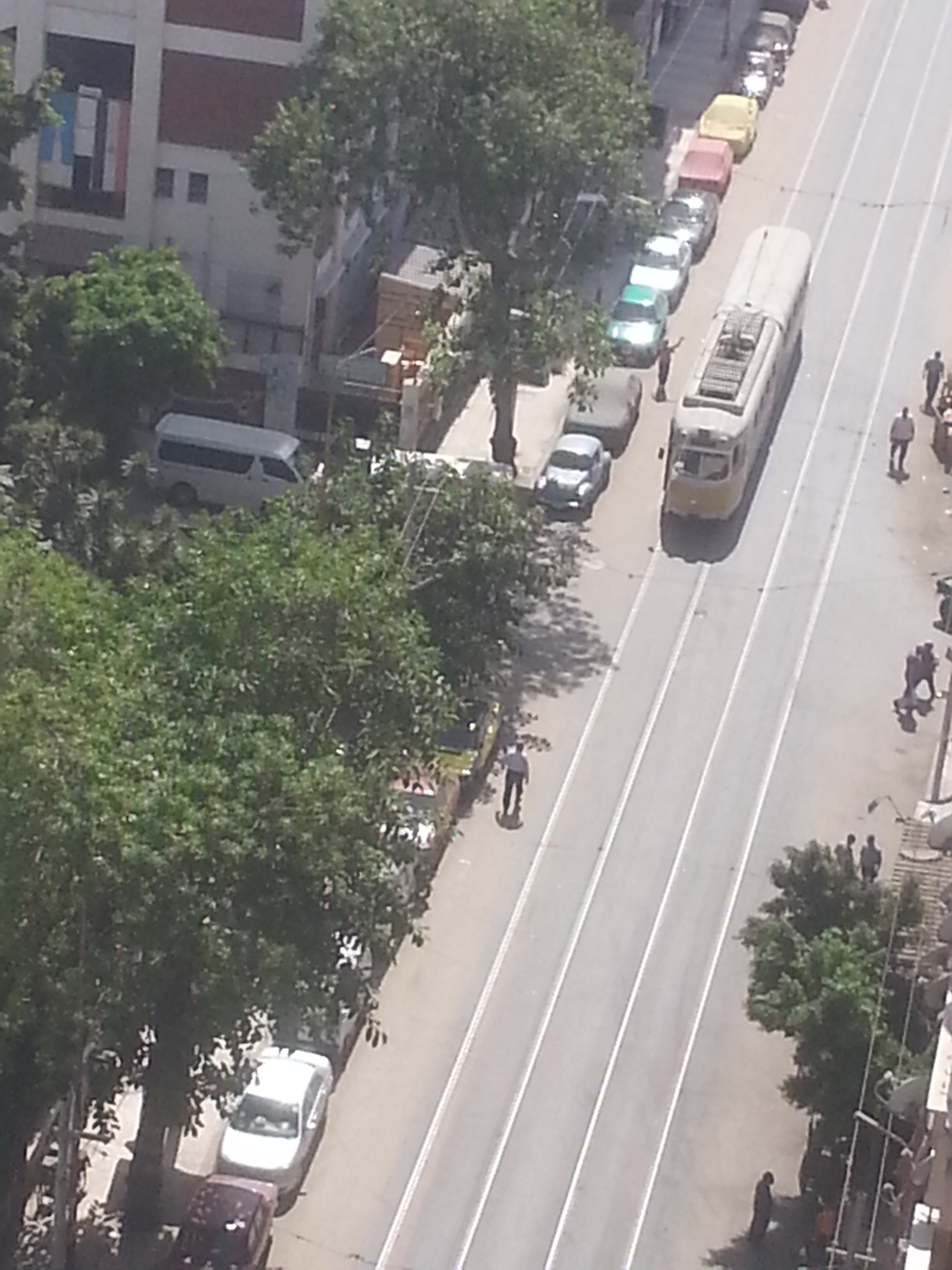
Tram in Moharam Bek street

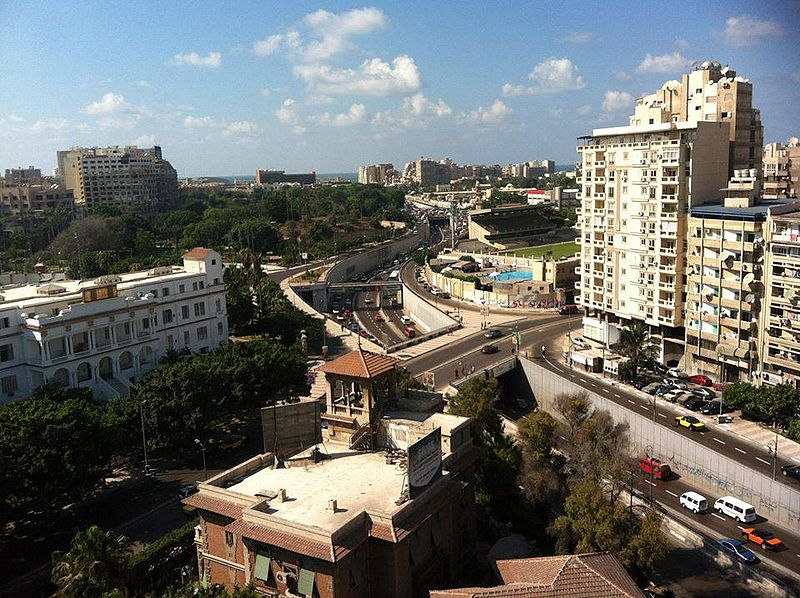
Abur Elmyah

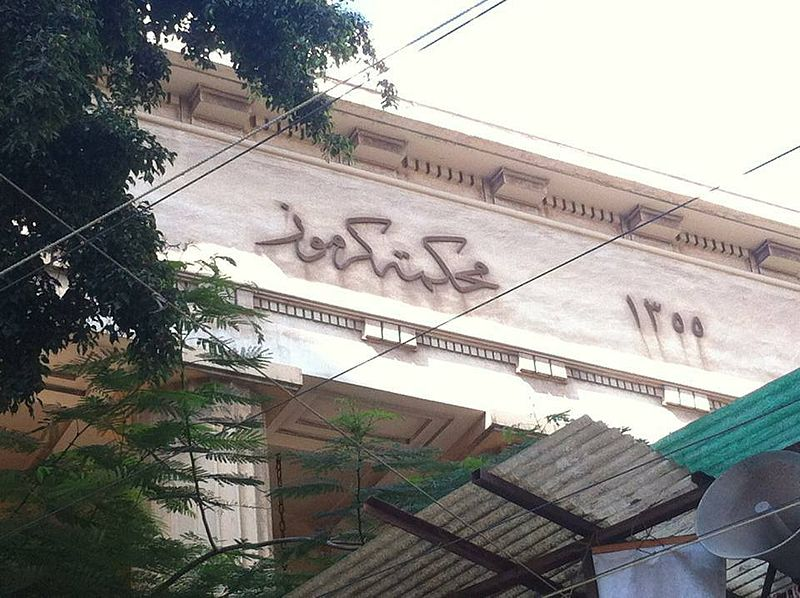
Karmoz Court

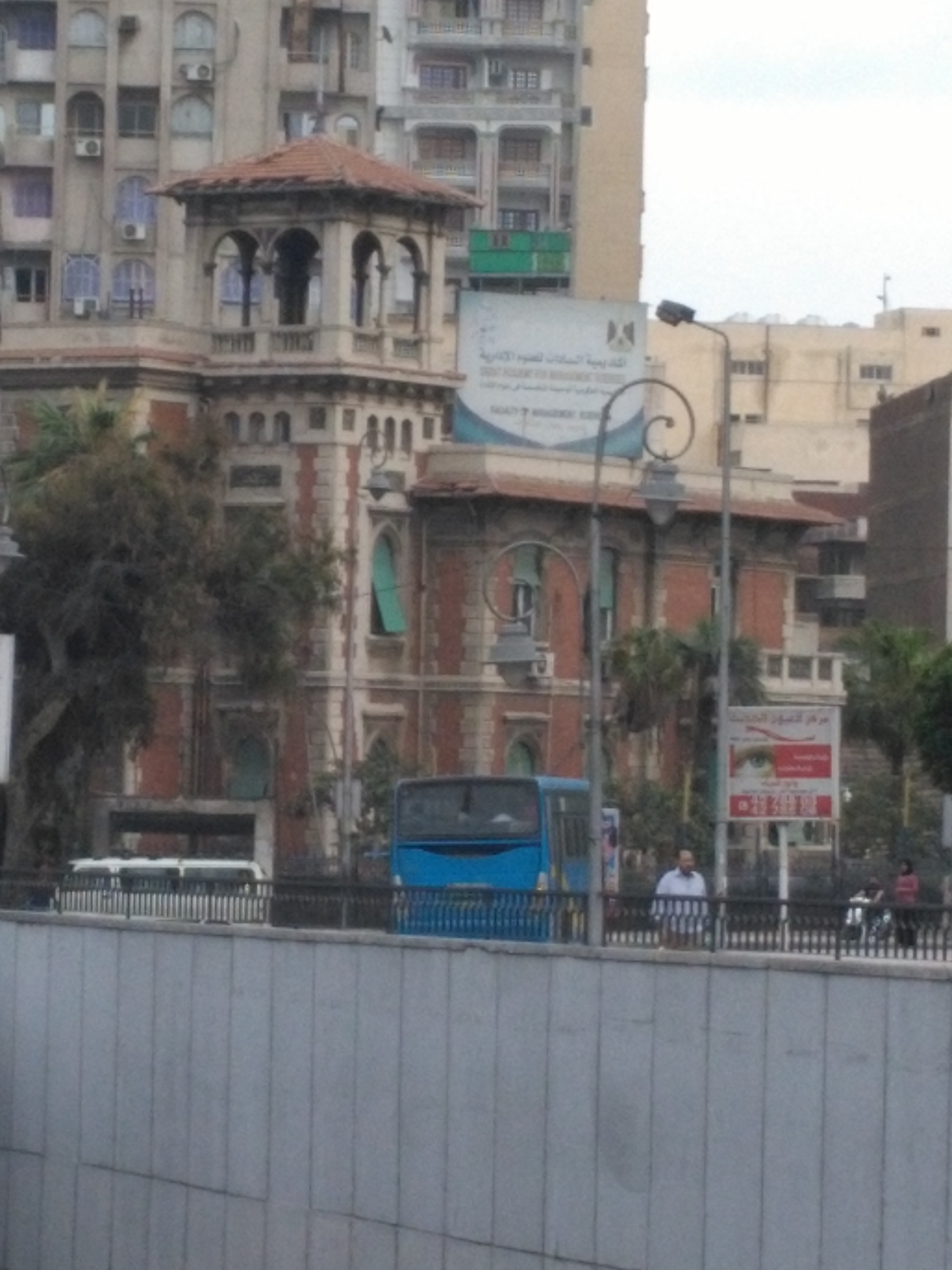
Sadat Academy

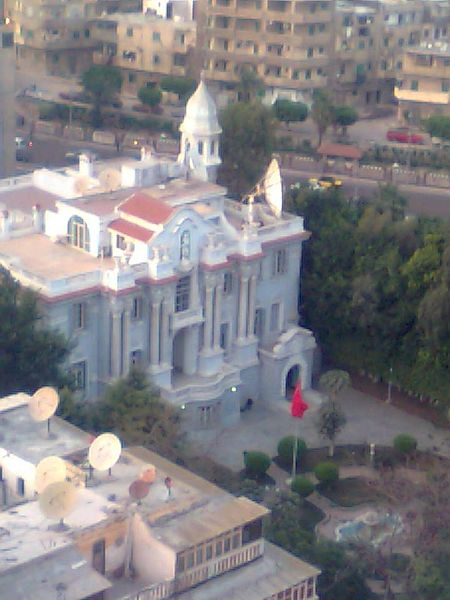
Chinese consulate inside

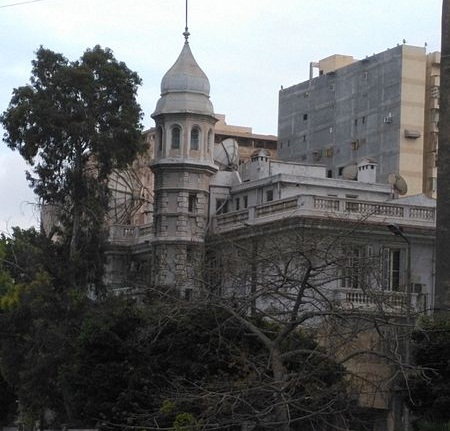
Chinese consulate outside

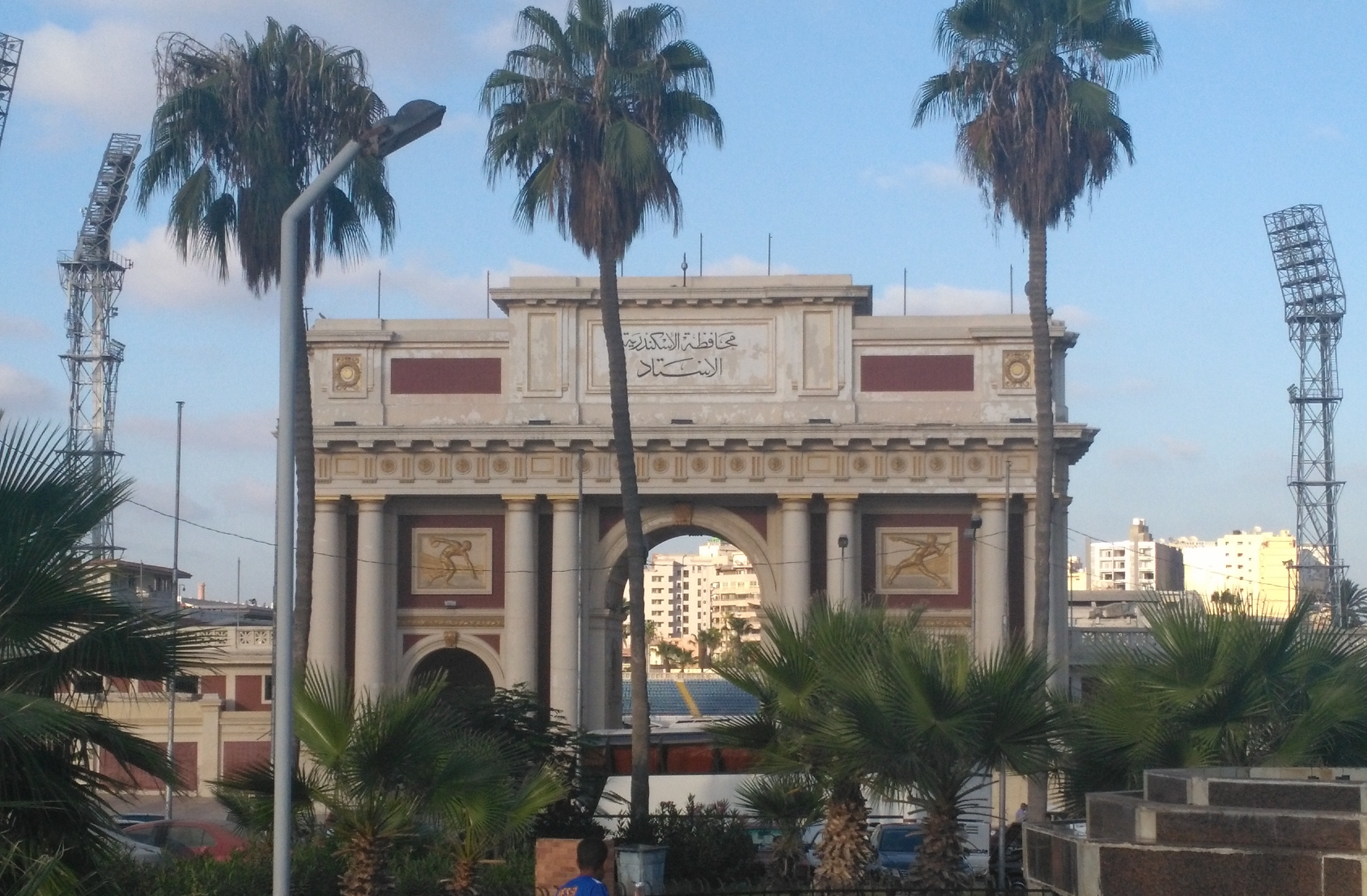
Alexandria stadium

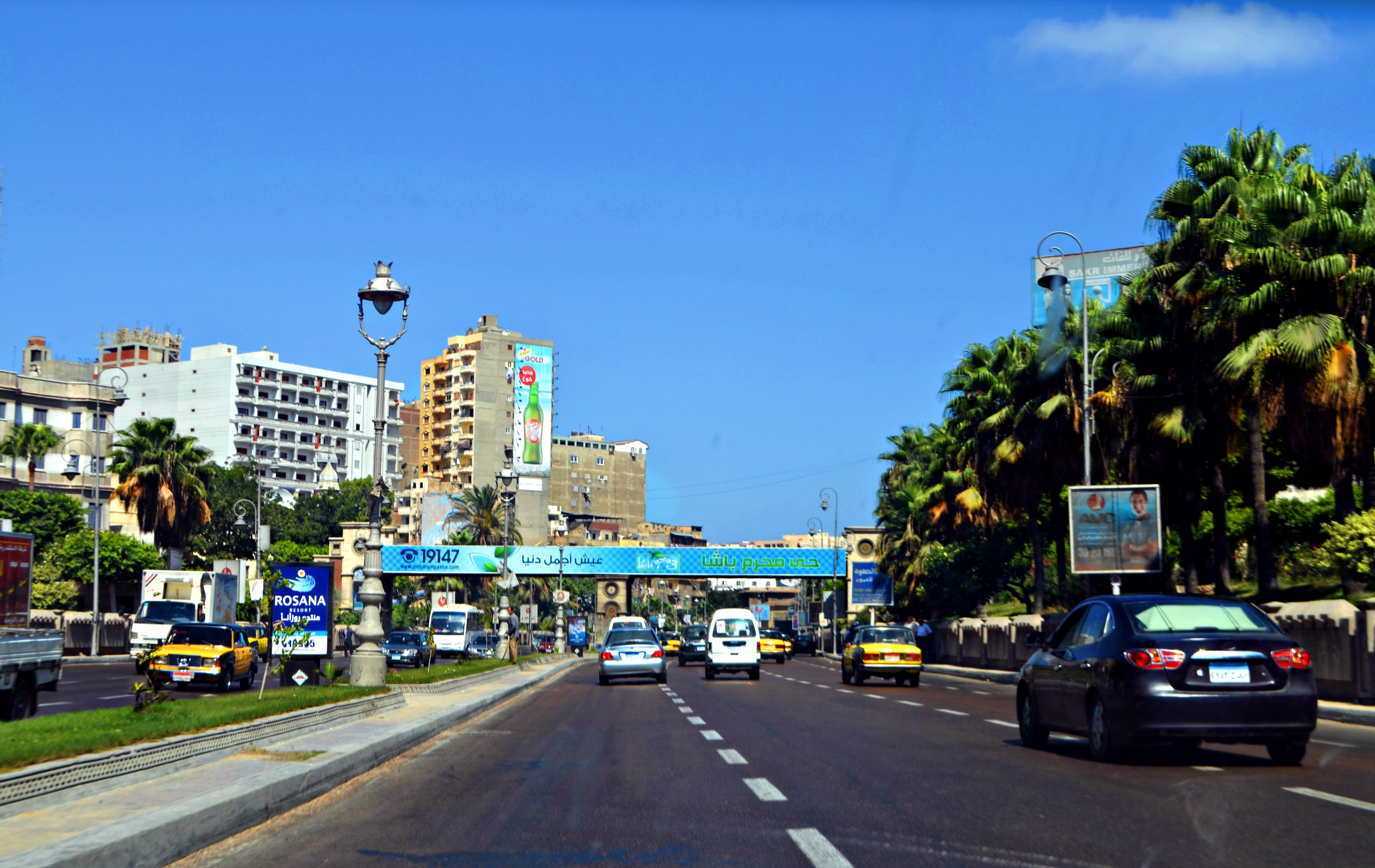
Suez canal street

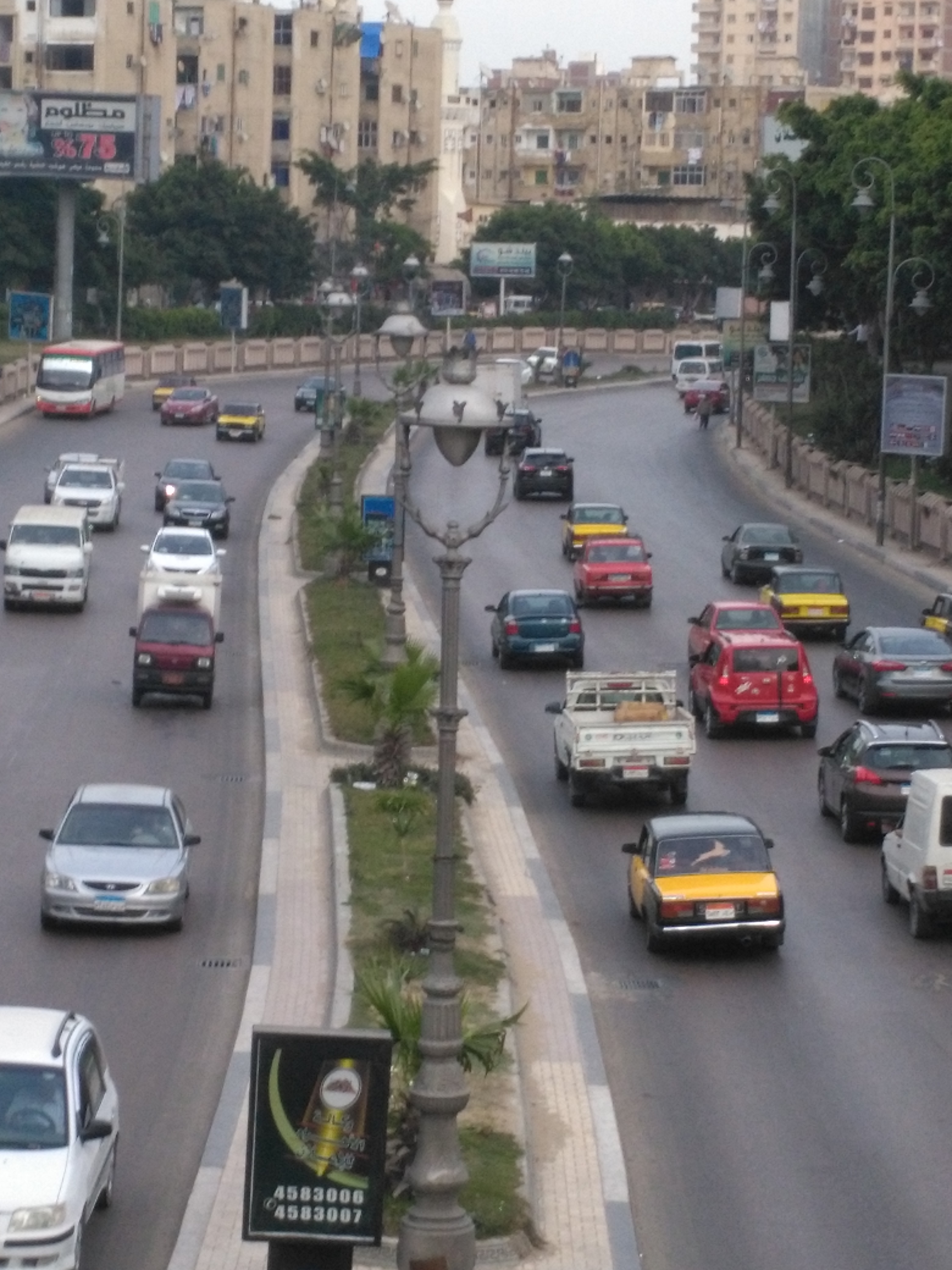
Suez canal street

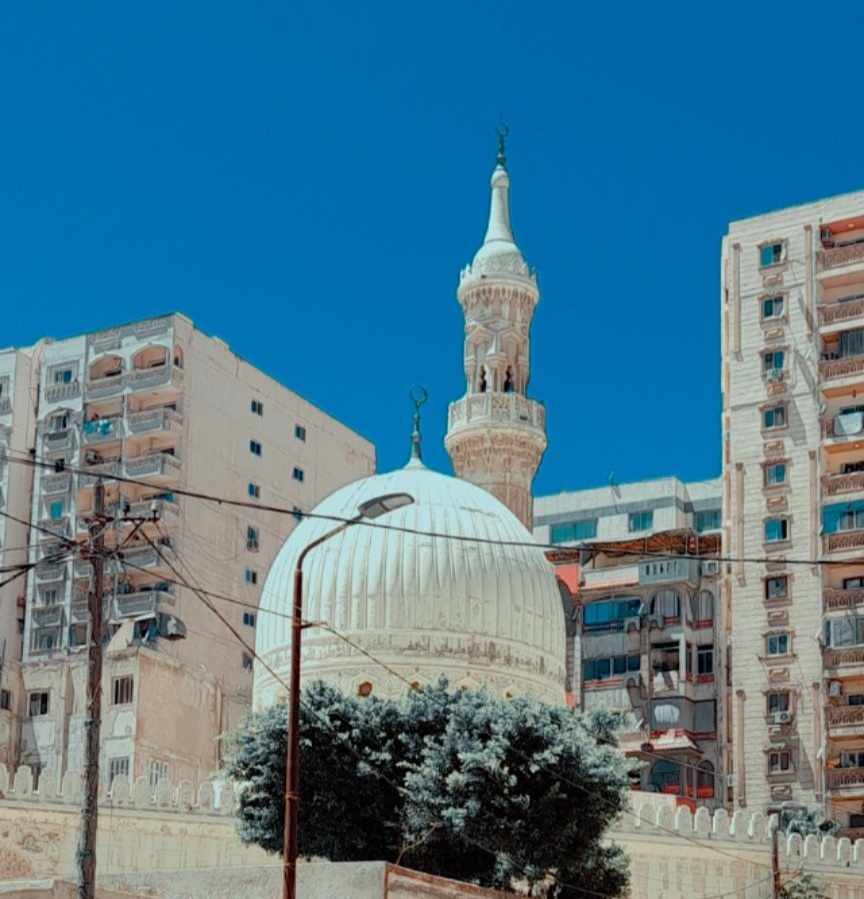
Awlad Elshikh mosque 🕌

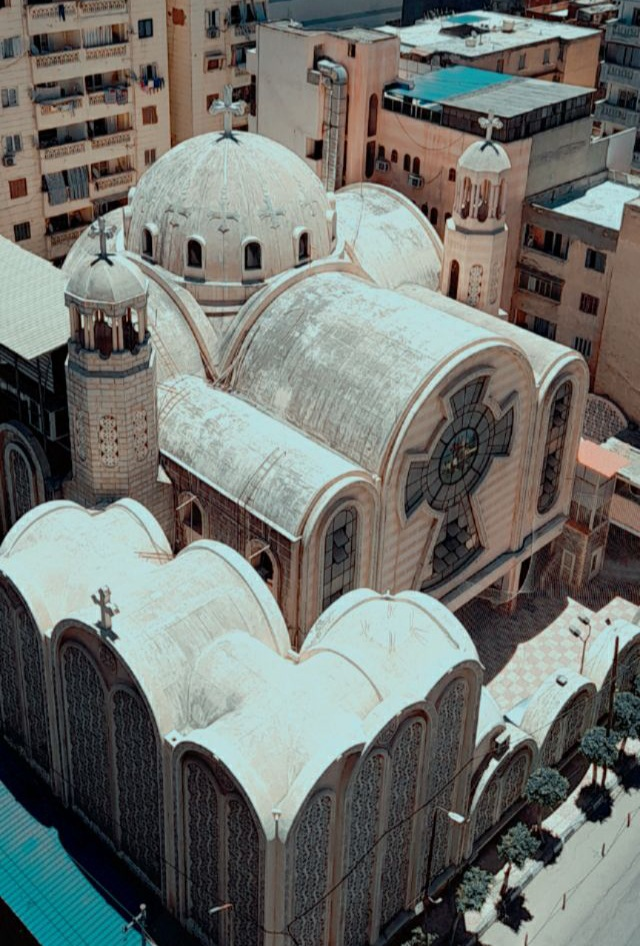
Margerges Church ⛪

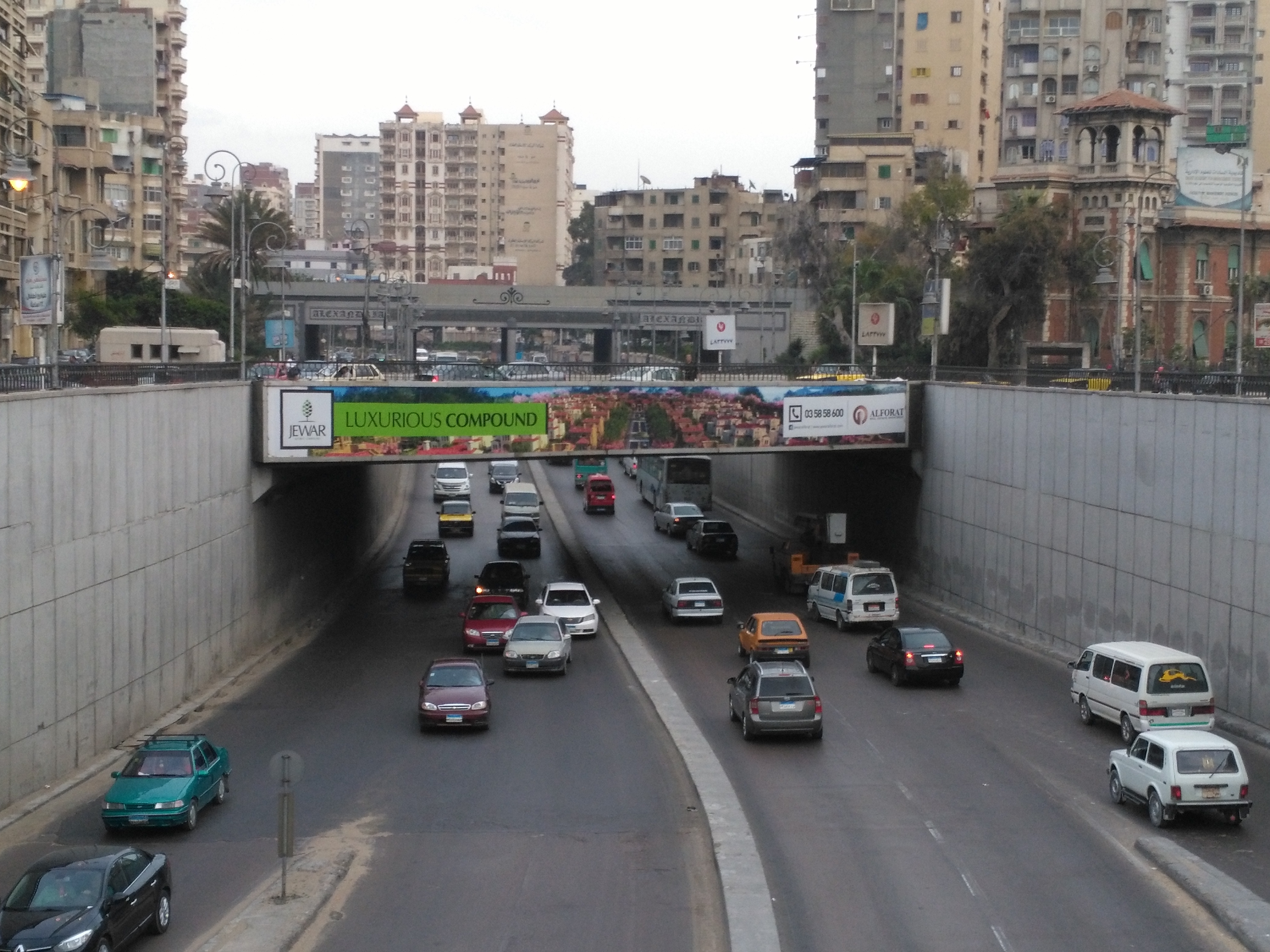
Suez Canal Street tunnel at the railway bridge

== Archaeology ==
In May 2026, archaeologists excavating the Moharram Bek uncovered architectural remains and artifacts dating to the Ptolemaic, Roman, and Byzantine periods. The excavation, conducted by Egypt’s Supreme Council of Antiquities, revealed a circular public bath of the Tholos type from the late Ptolemaic period and the remains of a Roman residential villa containing mosaic floors created using Opus Tessellatum and Opus Sectile techniques. Archaeologists also identified hydraulic installations associated with bathing facilities and water management. Recovered artifacts included marble statues interpreted as depictions of Bacchus, Asclepius, and Minerva, as well as coins, pottery vessels, oil lamps, and stamped amphora fragments. According to researchers, the findings provide evidence for continuous occupation of the area from the Ptolemaic period until the Byzantine era and contribute to studies of the historical urban layout of Alexandria.

== See also ==
- Neighborhoods in Alexandria
