= Azouz Synagogue =

Former synagogue in Alexandria, Egypt

- Arabic: كنيس عزوز

Religion
- Affiliation: Judaism (former)
- Ecclesiastical or organizational status: Synagogue
- Status: Closed

Location
- Location: Souk el Hosr (Souk El-Asr), Alexandria
- Country: Egypt

Architecture
- Completed: 1853 (rebuild)

The Azouz Synagogue (Arabic: كنيس عزوز) was a former Jewish synagogue, that was located near Souk el Hosr (Souk El-Asr), in Alexandria, Egypt. It was one of the oldest synagogues in Alexandria. It is unknown when it was built, however it was rebuilt in 1853.

== See also ==
- History of the Jews in Egypt
- List of synagogues in Egypt
- Eliyahu Hanavi Synagogue
