= Eliyahu Hanavi Synagogue =

Synagogue in Alexandria, Egypt

- Arabic: كنيس النبي إلياهو; Hebrew: בית הכנסת אליהו הנביא
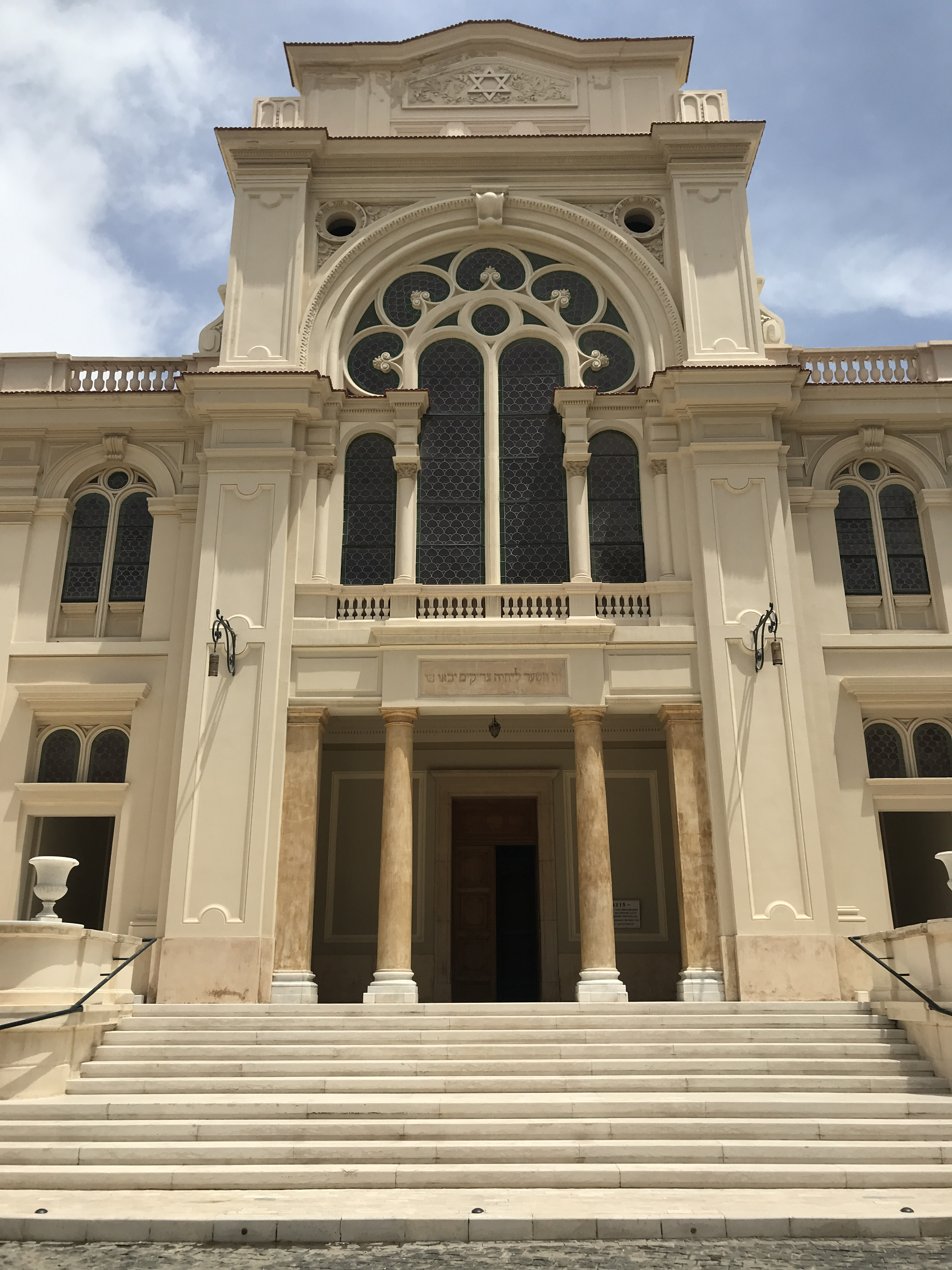
- The synagogue exterior, in 2024, following restoration

- Location of the synagogue, relative to the Nile Delta

Religion
- Affiliation: Judaism
- Rite: Nusach Sefard
- Ecclesiastical or organizational status: Synagogue: 1850–2012; Re-opened in 2020
- Status: Active

Location
- Location: 69 Nebi Daniel Street, Alexandria
- Country: Egypt
- Interactive map of Eliyahu Hanavi Synagogue
- Coordinates: 31°11′56″N 29°54′01″E

Architecture
- Type: Synagogue architecture
- Style: Neoclassical; Gothic Revival; Byzantine Revival
- Founder: Muhammad Ali Dynasty
- Funded by: Sir Moses Haim Montefiore
- Groundbreaking: 1836
- Completed: 1850

Specifications
- Capacity: 700 worshippers
- Materials: Italian marble

The Eliyahu Hanavi Synagogue (Arabic: كنيس النبي إلياهو; Hebrew: בית הכנסת אליהו הנביא) is a synagogue, located at 69 Nabi Daniel Street, Alexandria, Egypt.

== History ==
The current Synagogue is located on the site of an earlier synagogue that was completed in 1354. The earlier synagogue was bombed and destroyed by Napoleon's army in 1798, during the French invasion of Egypt.

Construction for the new, current synagogue began in 1836 with contributions from the Muhammad Ali Dynasty and was completed following assistance from Sir Moses Haim Montefiore. The synagogue was completed in 1850 in the Neoclassical style, with Gothic Revival and Byzantine Revival influences.

The synagogue was closed for the 5773 (2012) High Holidays because of security concerns, and subsequently fell into a state of disrepair. In 2017, the Egyptian government announced a project to restore the synagogue in a growing move of keeping its Jewish heritage alive. The Synagogue was included on the 2018 World Monuments Fund list of monuments at risk. Following its restoration, the synagogue was rededicated in January 2020, with three Jews present at the ceremony.

Although services are still held in the synagogue, it now caters to a very small community due to the dwindling number of Jews in Alexandria.

== See also ==
- History of the Jews in Alexandria
- List of synagogues in Egypt
- Mohammed Feiter Building
