= Faculty of Engineering, Alexandria University =

Faculty in Alexandria, Egypt

Faculty of Engineering Alexandria University
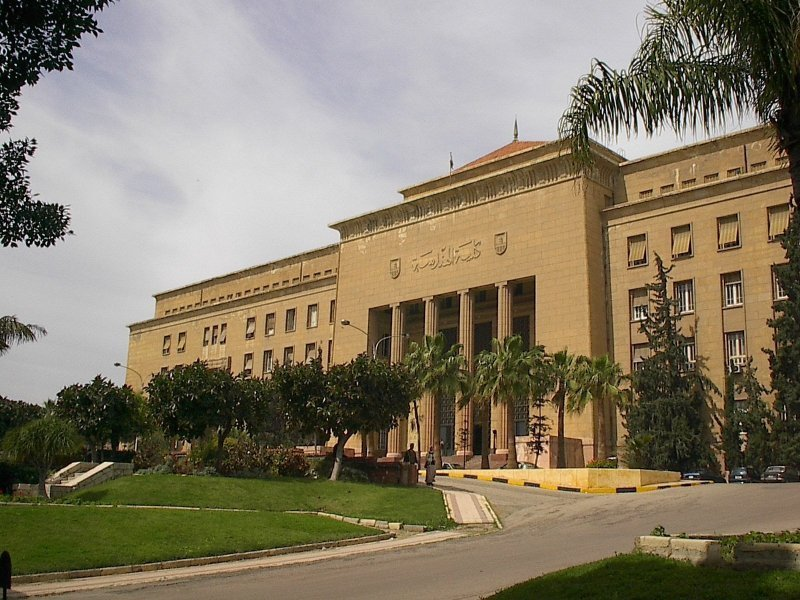
- Administration Building
- Type: Public
- Established: 1942
- Academic affiliations: Alexandria University
- Dean: Walid Abdel Azim Ibrahim El-Barki
- Location: Alexandria, Egypt; 31.20717°N 29.92422°E
- Campus: Urban, 11.3 ha (28 acres)
- Colors: Blue & orange
- Nickname: Alex-Eng
- Mascot: Egyptian cobra
- Website: eng.alexu.edu.eg

The Faculty of Engineering, Alexandria University (Arabic: كلية الهندسة جامعة الإسكندرية) was established in 1942.

== History ==
At the beginning of the academic year 1941–1942, the Faculty of Engineering of King Fuad I University established a branch in Alexandria for the preparatory year study. In 1942, Farouk I University was established in Alexandria, and the branch of the faculty of Engineering became the Faculty of Engineering in King Farouk I University. The study in the preparatory year and the first year started simultaneously in the academic year 1942–1943; the study started in the departments of Architecture, Civil Engineering, Mechanical Engineering and Electrical Engineering. In 1946, the Department of Sanitary Engineering and Municipalities was established. The Departments of Civil Engineering and Electrical Engineering were developed over the years. In 1953, the Institute of Industrial Chemistry which was affiliated to the Faculty of Science, became one of the departments of the Faculty of Engineering as the Chemical Engineering Department, from which the first class was graduated in 1954. The Departments of Nuclear Engineering and Computer and Automatic Control were established in 1964 and 1974 respectively.

- In 1941 The Faculty of Engineering – Cairo University established its branch in Alexandria.
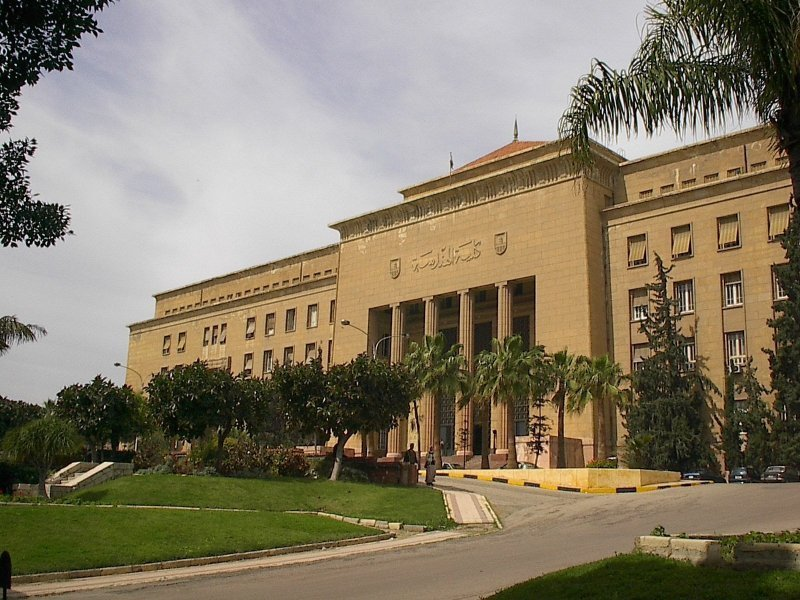
- Faculty of Engineering, Alexandria University
  1942 The emanation of law ordinance No. 32 for the year 1942 for founding Alexandria University.
- 1942 The inception of the education in of the preparatory year and the first year (Architecture, Civil Engineering, Electrical and Mechanical Engineering)
- 1946 Establishing the department of Sanitary Engineering and Municipalities.
- 1953 Establishing the department of Chemical Engineering
- 1960 Establishing the departments of Mechanical Power Engineering, and Weaving & Textile Engineering.
- 1961 Establishing the department of Marine Engineering.
- 1963 Establishing the department of Production Engineering.
- 1964 Establishing the department of Nuclear Engineering.
- 1974 Establishing the department of Computer and Automatic Control.
- 2006 Adopting Specialized Scientific Programs (S.S.P) using Credit hours system.

== Campus ==
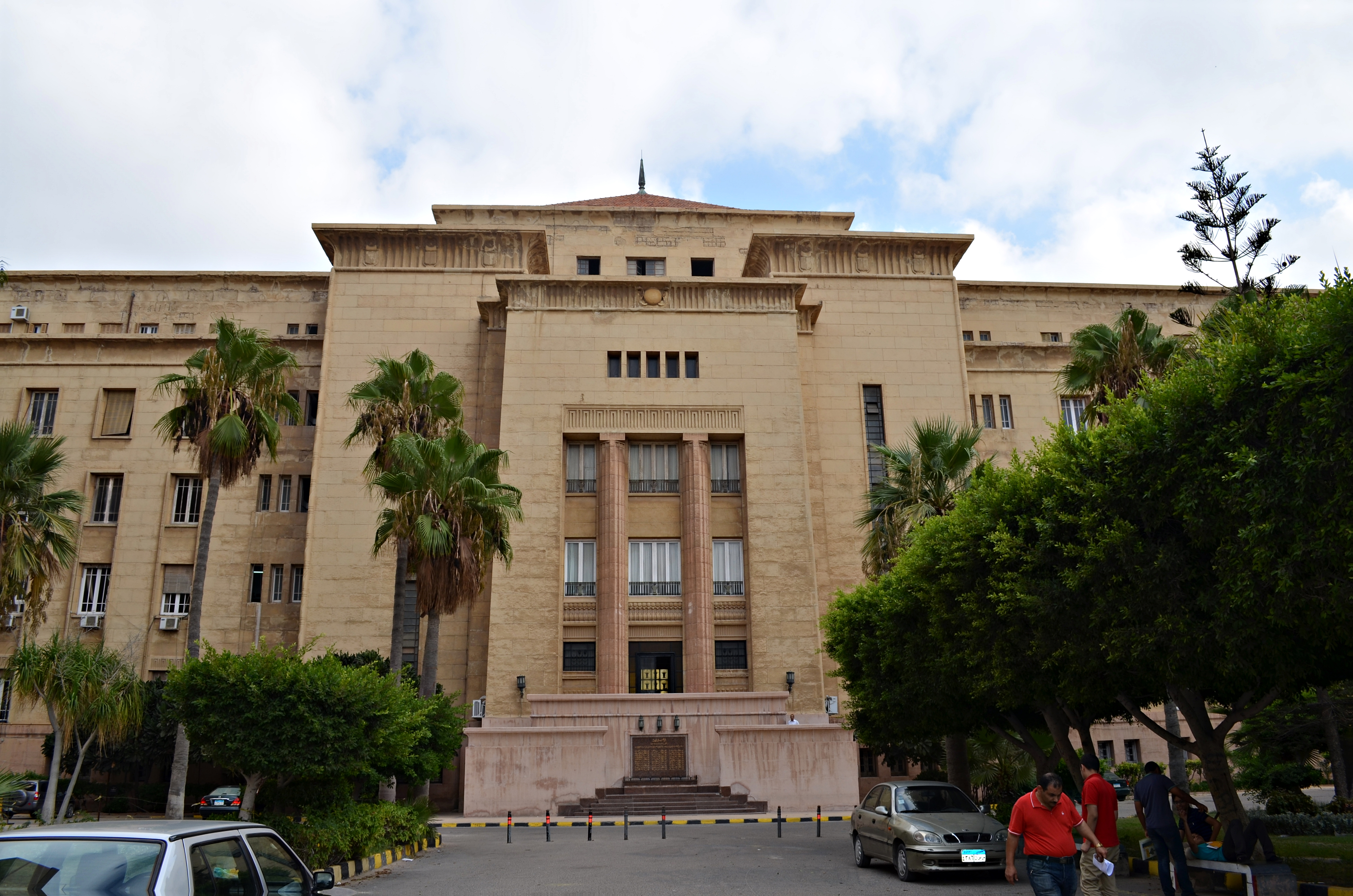
Administration building

The Faculty is located in the middle of the city of Alexandria. It has an area of over 110,000 m^{2} (1,200,000 sq ft) and consists of 10 buildings, six of them are famous for their Pharaonic style. The building are:

- Administration building
- Preparatory building
- Mechanical departments building
- Textile Engineering building
- Production workshop
- Electrical Engineering workshop
- Electrical departments building
- The clinic building
- Student Activity building
- SSP building

The Campus also includes a football ground, a tennis court and a volleyball/basketball combined field.

== Undergraduate ==
The Faculty follows the credit hours system per academic year. The duration of study to obtain a Bachelor of Engineering (B.Eng.) degree is five academic years (a preparatory year, followed by four academic years). Each semester runs for 15 weeks.

== Credit hours system ==
The Faculty of Engineering, Alexandria University has developed a curriculum to upgrade the Graduate Studies and Research based on credit hours system, to provide advanced academic programs to match the development of different fields and to enhance scientific experience to support the rapid pace of development worldwide. It consists of a three-semester system The Fall Semester (First Semester): Starts on the Third Saturday of September and Lasts for 15 weeks. Spring Semester (Second Semester): Starts on the Second Saturday of February and Lasts for 15 weeks. Summer Semester (Third Semester): Starts on the First Saturday of July and Lasts for 8 Weeks.

- Postgraduate
  - The student is allowed to register 12 credit hours per regular semester and 6 credit hours in the summer semester. Full-time students are allowed to register a maximum of 18 credit hours per regular semester and 9 credit hours in the summer semester.
- Specialized Scientific Programs (SSP)
  - The student is allowed to register 20 credit hours per regular semester and 6 credit hours in the summer semester. For emergency cases students are allowed to register a maximum of 22 credit hours per regular semester and 9 credit hours in the summer semester.

== Academic departments ==
- Architectural Engineering Department.
- Chemical Engineering Department.
- Electrical Engineering Departments:
  - Electrical Power Engineering & Machines Department.
  - Electronics Engineering & Communications Department.
  - Computer and Systems Engineering Department.
- Engineering Mathematics and Physics Department. (Preparatory Stage)
- Irrigation Engineering And Hydraulics Department.
- Marine Engineering And Naval Architecture Department.
- Mechanical Engineering Department.
- Nuclear and Radiation Engineering Department.
- Production Engineering Department.
- Sanitary Engineering Department.
- Structural Engineering Department.
- Textile Engineering Department.
- Transportation Engineering Department.

== Specialized scientific programs (S.S.P) ==
The Faculty Of Engineering introduces eight Specialized Scientific Programs using the Course credit system and Grade Point Average (GPA) for the first time in the Faculty. These programs are:

- Gas And Petrochemicals Engineering.
- Electromechanical Engineering.
- Computer and Communications Engineering.
- Architecture and Construction Engineering.
- Civil and Environmental Engineering.
- Mechatronics and Robotics Engineering.
- Materials Science and Engineering.
- Biomedical Engineering.

== Postgraduate ==
Similar to the SSP the postgraduate programs follow the credit hours system. The Faculty offers the following post-graduate degrees:

- The Technical Diploma.
- Postgraduate diploma.
- Master's degree.
- Master of Science.
- Doctor of Philosophy.

== Special units ==
The Faculty of Engineering has 3 Special Units that are involved in supporting the Faculty and Alexandria University with their facilities:

- The Engineering Center,
- The Scientific Computation Center
- The Production Unit
- Quality Control Center

== Notable alumni ==
- Mohamed Abdou Egyptian nuclear Engineer.
- Azer Bestavros Warren Distinguished Professor of Computer Science at Boston University, best known for his work on web push caching for Content Distribution Networks
- Hassaballah El Kafrawy Former Minister of Development, Reconstruction, Housing, New Communities, Public Utilities and Land Reclamation (1977–1993).
- Yahya El Mashad Egyptian nuclear physicist
- Mohamed Hashish Egyptian research scientist best known as the father of the abrasive water jet cutter.
- Rasheed Mohamed Rasheed Former Egyptian Minister of Industry and foreign trade
- Gamal Refai-Ahmed (Faculty of Engineering, 1985) Egyptian thermal Engineer, University of Waterloo Distinguished Alumni, Member of US National Academy of Engineering, Fellow of Canadian Academy of Engineering, Fellow IEEE, Life Fellow ASME. best known for his groundbreaking contributions to thermal management in electronics packaging and his extensive work in silicon and power architecture as well as advanced packaging technologies.
- Bahgat G. Sammakia (Faculty of Engineering, 1977) Director of CHIRP at Binghamton University; Distinguished Professor; Vice President for Research; Dir of CHIRP at Binghamton Univ; Center Director of ES2; Director, S3IP; Center Director of ES2; Vice President for Research; Director, S3IP Binghamton University, best known for his pioneering contributions to thermal and mechanical management in electronics packaging and his leadership in the field of electronics systems integration and reliability.
- Moustafa Youssef Egyptian Computer Scientist and Engineer. First and only ACM Fellow in the Middle East and Africa.

== See also ==
- List of Engineering Faculties in Egypt
- Alexandria University
- Educational institutions in Alexandria
- Engineering
- Course credit
