= Muhammad Abdu =

Muhammad Abdu may refer to:

- Muhammad Abdu, member of the Nigerian National Assembly delegation from Bauchi
- Mohammed Abdu (born 1949), Saudi singer
- Muhammad Abduh (1849–1905), Egyptian jurist and theologian
- Mohamed Abdou, Egyptian nuclear engineer
- Mohamed Abdou (political scientist)
