= Jannat =

Moroccan-Egyptian singer and actress (born 1986)

- جنات
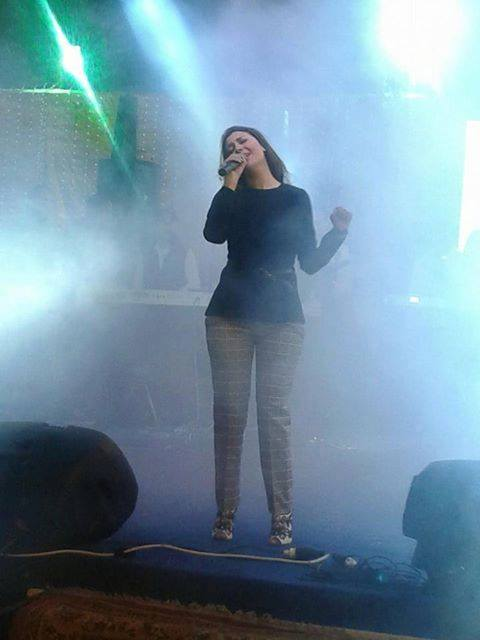
- Jannat at the 2013 graduation ceremony of the Faculty of Science, Alexandria University
- Born: Jannat Mahid; 6 January 1986 (age 40); Oued Zem, Morocco
- Spouse: Mohamed Othman Noman (m. 2017)
- Children: 2
- Musical career
- Genres: Arabic pop; Khaliji; romance
- Occupations: Musician; singer; actress
- Instruments: Vocals
- Years active: 2004–present
- Labels: Good News 4 Music; Rotana

Jannat Mahid (Arabic: جنات مهيد; born 6 January 1986), known mononymously as Jannat (Arabic: جنات, Moroccan Arabic: [ʒænˈnɛːt], Egyptian Arabic: [ɡænˈnæːt]); is a Moroccan-Egyptian singer and actress. She was born in Morocco and presently living and performing in Egypt. Jannat sings in Egyptian Arabic. She is one of the most prominent young female singers in the Arab world. Jannat participated for the first time in a singing competition in Morocco entitled "Stars of Tomorrow" when she reached the age of eight. She stood on stage accompanied by a musical band and won the first prize. After that, she performed in local singing competitions. Upon reaching the age of fifteen, she participated in the Dubai Nights Festival and won the award for best singing voice in the Arab world in 2000. After that, she received an invitation from Mrs. Ratiba El-Hefny, director of the Cairo Opera House, to participate in a concert in the Grand Theater, and that was the first time that she stood in front of the Egyptian public.

During her participation in the opera house, producer Ahmed Desouki noticed her talent and vocal ability, and determined to deal with her. but she was fifteen years old, and still continuing her education in Morocco, which caused difficulty in completing the contract between them. After completing her studies and obtaining a university degree in business administration, Jannat devoted herself entirely to singing. She released her first song "Efhamny Habiby" in 2004 and she filmed it in a music video.

Jannat contracted with producer Ahmed Desouki, owner of Good News 4 Music, in 2005. In 2006, Desouki produced her first studio album Elli Beny W Benak and in the same year, she released a music video for the song "Aktar Min Sana". Jannat released her second album Hob Emtelak in 2009. In 2013, Rotana Records released Jannat's third album Hob Gamed. In 2016, Jannat released her fourth album Be Nafs El Kalam. Jannat filmed a number of her most successful songs in a music video. She also sang in many Egyptian drama series, including: Zohra w Azwagha El Khamsa, Woman's diary with a Bad Reputation and Hekayat w Beneshha.

Jannat gained the admiration of the masses through the album Elli Beny W Benak, which won many awards. Her second album, Hob Emtelak, gained the highest sales rate and through it, she won the Middle East Music Award and the Arab Radio and Television Network Award.

Jannat recently released a Moroccan national song, "Mama Africa", on the occasion of the return of Morocco to the African Union, accompanied by African stars. In 2020, she released her fifth album Ana Fe Entezarak.

== Biography ==
=== Early life ===
Jannat grew up with three siblings. She was the youngest and only girl among them. Jannat's passion for singing was revealed early, when she attracted attention of her parents at age 5, repeating songs of Umm Kulthum and Mohammed Abdel Wahab. Supported by her family (namely her mother who is a retired singer), she started performing by the age of 8 when she participated and won in a national Moroccan music competition. Later she took part of a TV broadcast "Noujoum Al Ghad" (Stars Of Tomorrow, 2M TV). Jannat also won in another 3 music competitions in Morocco. She decided to travel to the Middle East in an attempt to pursue her success, fame and stardom.

In 2000, Jannat won the first place (Best Arabic Voice) in "Layali Dubai", part of Dubai Shopping Festival (DSF). She also won in competition in Alexandria. Noticed by Ratiba El-Hefny, she was invited to sing as an honored guest in Cairo Congress of Arab Music. Jannat then found herself on the stage of the Cairo Opera House, co-performing with Majida El Roumi, Wadih El Safi and Sabah Fakhri. After that she stopped her artistic activity until she took a certificate in Business and International Marketing.

=== Personal life ===
In 2017, Jannat married Egyptian lawyer Mohamed Othman Noman. She has two daughters with him.

=== Career ===
Jannat started singing professionally and released her first song "Efhamny Habiby" in 2004, which had a music video filmed as well. At that time, the producer Ahmed Desouki was seeking new voices. He liked Jannat's voice and signed a contract with her in 2005. After that, Jannat started to prepare for her new album Elli Beny W Benak to be issued in 2006. The preparation of the album took a year and half due to the desire of the producer to achieve success with the album, thus spending a lot of time perfecting it. Jannat recorded 21 songs however the album had only contained 10 of them. The album had achieved success and she made a music video for the song "Aktar Min Sana". The album songs were a collection of romantic and sad songs that described a woman's powerful feelings.

Jannat released other albums with the label Good News 4 Music: GoodNews4Music Vol.1 and Hob Emtelak, which they had great success in Egypt and in the Arab World. Jannat was then ranked as one of the best upcoming artists in the Middle East.

In 2012, Jannat signed with the famous Arabian pop label Rotana for a "three albums" deal. At the time of signing, she already produced herself the first album Hob Gamed, which gave Jannat international success and her hit "El Badi Azlam" along "Hob Gamed" made her travel many countries. She had several concerts performing her songs "Hala Febrayer" in Koweit and "Souq Waqif" in Doha. Hob Gamed was also a bestseller and had significant selling figures in Egypt and Saudi Arabia.

In 2016, Jannat released her 4th studio album Be Nafs El Kalam.

On August 14, 2020, Jannat released her 5th studio album Ana Fe Entezarak.

== Discography ==
=== Studio albums ===
- 2006: Elli Beny W Benak – اللي بيني وبينك
- 2009: Hob Emtelak – حب إمتلاك
- 2013: Hob Gamed – حب جامد
- 2016: Be Nafs El Kalam – بنفس الكلام
- 2017: Adaiya Diniya – أدعية دينية
- 2020: Ana Fe Entezarak – أنا في انتظارك

=== Other albums ===
- 2008: Good News 4 Music Vol.1 (with the song "Habibi 'ala Neyato")

=== Singles ===
Elly Beny W Benak 2005 version which is not documented and has no online trace. This version is in a higher key and slightly faster than the later album version of 2006.

Elly Beny W Benak 2006 album version.

Single	Lyrics	Composer	Production	Year	Album
Efhamny habebe	Hany Abd El-Kerim	Walid Sa'ad	Jannat	2004	
Elli Beny W Benak	Khaled Muneer; Nadir Abdullah	Mohamed Raheem	Good News 4 Music	2005	(single; a different mix than the album version of 2006)
Aktar Min Sana	Nader Abdallah	Mohamed Yehia	Good News 4 Music	2006	Elli Beny W Benak
Bahebak	Khaled Amiin	Mohamed Rahiim	Good News 4 Music	2007	Elli Beny W Benak
Habiby 3ala Neyatoh	Bahaa El-Dein Mohamed	Mohamed El-Sawy	Good News 4 Music	2008	
Ana Donyetoh	Nader AbdAllah	Walid Sa'ad	Good News 4 Music	2009	Hob Emtelak
Hob Gamed	Aziz El Shaf3i	Aziz El Shaf3i	Rotana	2013	Hob Gamed
El Bady Azlam	Tamer Hossein	Asshraf Salem	Rotana	2013	Hob Gamed
Waheshny	Aziz El Shaf3i	Aziz El Shaf3i	Rotana	2014	Hob Gamed
Agbany Shakhsito	Salama Ali	Mohamed Yahia	Rotana	2015	

=== Other songs ===
- 2011: Gawaz Safary, (Lyrics: Wael Gheriany, composer: Ashraf Salem)
- 2011: Ramadan, (Lyrics: Wael Gheriany, composer: Ashraf Salem)
- 2013: Qess El Nes2 Fel Quran, (Lyrics: Mohamed Bahget, composer: Mahmoud Tal'at)
- 2014: Estahmlny, (Lyrics: Ahmed Baree2, composer: Mohamed El-Sawy)
- 2015: Ehtmamy fek
- 2016: Lel farah Melad
- 2016: Ehna El Hayah, (Lyrics : Mohammed El Bogha, composer: Mohammed Yahya)

== Videography ==
- 2004: Efhamny Habiby, Directed by : Yasser Sami
- 2006: Aktar Min Sana, Directed by : Mohamed Gom'a
- 2007: Bahebak, Directed by : Mohamed Gom'a
- 2009: Ana Donyetoh, Directed by : Mohamed Gom'a
- 2011: Gawaz Safary, Directed By : Mohamed Gom'a
- 2013: El Bady Azlam, Directed by : Waleed Nassif
- 2014: Hob Gamed, Directed by : Waleed Nassif
- 2014: Waheshny, Directed by : Waleed Nassif
- 2016: Ehna El Hayah, Directed by : Said El Farouk
- 2016: Aiza Arrab
