= Hassab =

Hassab may refer to:

- Hassab Hospital, a hospital in Alexandria, Egypt
- Hassab's decongestion operation, an elective surgical procedure in portal hypertension
- Mohammed Aboul-Fotouh Hassab, an Egyptian surgeon
