= Khaled Elleithy =

Egyptian professor

- Occupations: Academic; scientist

Academic background
- Thesis: A Formal Framework for High-Level Synthesis of Digital Designs (1990)
- Doctoral advisor: Magdy Abd El-Aziz Bayoumi

Academic work
- Institutions: University of Bridgeport
- Notable students: Abdul Razaque
- Main interests: Engineering Technology & Applied Sciences
- Website: https://profiles.bridgeport.edu/user/elleithy/

Khaled Elleithy is an Egyptian professor of computer science and engineering. He is the current dean of the College of Engineering, Business, and Education and he is also serving as associate vice president for graduate studies and research at the University of Bridgeport.

== Education ==
He obtained his first degree in computer science and automatic control in 1983 from Alexandria University . He earned his Master's degree in computer networks from the same institution in 1986. He obtained another Master's degree in Computer Science in 1988 and Ph.D. degree 1990 from the Center for Advanced Computer Studies, University of Louisiana, Lafayette.

== Scientific contributions ==
He discovered new applications for wireless technology and he built epilepsy detection device that could detect the signal before the attack.

== Fellowship and membership ==
He is a senior Member of the IEEE computer society. In 1990, he became a member of the Association for Computing Machinery (ACM) and a member of the Special Interest Group on Computer Architecture. In 1983, he became a lifetime member of the Egyptian Engineering Syndicate. In 1988, he became a member of the IEEE Circuits & Systems society and the IEEE Computer Society. In 2018, he was elected as a member of the African Academy of Sciences.
