= Ahmed Shablool =

- أحمد شبلول
- Born: February 23, 1953 (age 72); Alexandria, Egypt
- Notable work: "Traveling to God" in 1980 "The sea is lost" in 1985 "Street's trees are my sisters" in 1994
- Awards: Dubai cultural magazine-Dubai 2009. The Egyptian writers conference 2009. The Arab Union for electronic media 2010.

Ahmed Shablool (Arabic: أحمد شبلول) is an Egyptian journalist, critic, and poet. He has published many children's stories. In addition, he received many awards as: State Incentive Award in literature in 2008 for "Street's trees are my sisters" (Ashjar alshare ekhwaty).

== Biography ==
Ahmed Shablool was born in Alexandria on February 23, 1953. He graduated from Alexandria University with a Bachelor of Commerce degree in 1978. After graduating, Shablool worked in the field of tourism, he also worked as an editor and a researcher in print and electronic journalism. He worked in the field of scientific publishing and as a Director of Editing and Publishing at the Riyadh Information Service Company from 1987 until 1991. A year later, he worked for eight years as an editor and linguist at the Department of Scientific Publishing ang Printing at King Saud University, Riyadh, in 1991. Ahmed was the administrator of Al-Babtain cultural programs at Al-Bawadi channel in Kuwait, then he worked as an editor and literary researcher for Al Arabiya magazine in Kuwait in 2010. Meanwhile, he serves as Head of the Cultural Section of Middle East Online. Shablool participated in the founding of the Varus group of Literature and Arts in Alexandria. From 2005 to 2009, he was the vice-president of the Arab Internet Writers. He was a member of the Board Directors of the Arts, Literature and Social Sciences in Alexandria, member of the story club in Cairo, a member of the board of directors of the Egyptian Writers Union, and a Chairman of the Committee on Arab relation in the union and others.

Shablool started writing poetry since he was a high school student, he used to participate in Poetry Club of the Palace of Liberty for many years. He published 13 Diwan poetry, one is his last Diwan "Hide in my chest" (Ekhtabee fi sadry) in 2017. He also has many children's poems, recently he started writing novels, where he published his first novel entitled "Editor-in-chief .... Biographical whims". In addition, Shablool has many publications in the field of journey literature, children's literature, literary and critical studies. Some of his work has been translated into many languages including English, French, German and others. He received several awards during his literary career, including the 2008 State Encouragement Prize in Literature for the children's Diwan "Street Trees are my sisters", and the 2019 State Award for Excellence in Literature.

== Works ==
Some of his writings:

=== Diwan of poetry ===
- "Traveling to God" (original title: Msafer ela Allah) in 1980.
- "The sea is lost" (original title: Wa yadee albaher) in 1985.
- "Two birds in the sea burning" (original title: Asforan fi albaher yahtareqan) in 1986.
- "Peep of the robotic bird" (original title: Taghreed altayer alaly) in 1996.
- "The bird and the open window" (original title: Altayer wa alshubak almaftooh) in 1999.
- "Alexandria emigrant" (original title: Escandareyat almuhajarah) in 1999.
- "Another Sun. Another sea" (original title: Shames okhrah. Bahar akhar) in 2000.
- "Water and roses for us" (original title: Alma lna wa alwared) in 2001.
- "Another sea" (original title: Bahar akhar) (selected poetries translated to French) in 2003.

=== Children's Literature ===
- "Street's trees are my sisters" (original title: Ashjar alshare ekhwaty) (poetry) in 1994.
- "Talk of the sun and the moon" (original title: Hadeeth alshames wa alqamar) (poetry) in 1997.
- "Beret the wise is speaking" (original title: Beret alhakeem yatahadath) in 1999.
- "Plane and a city" (original title: Tayerah wa madeenah) (poetry) in 2001.
- "The family of stones" (original title: Ayelat alahjar) in 2003.

==== Novels ====
- "Editor-in-chief .... Biographical whims" (original title: Rayees altahreer ... Ahwa alserah althateyah).

== Awards ==
- The first prize by the Higher Council for Culture- study commission of Literature and Linguistics in 1999 for his research "Technology of children's literature".
- Dubai Cultural and Scientific Association- for his research "child's culture in the time of Technology" in 2003.
- The General Union of Arab Writers and the Union of Algerian Writers Award for his research "The child and War Contemporary Arab Poetry Space" at the 22nd General Conference of Arab Writers, in Algeria 2003.
- Award of Merit and Excellence from ADEW in Cairo for his study "Reading in Egyptian Women's Novel Creation" in 2004.
- Certificate of Honor from the International Society of Translators and Creators (WATA) in 2007.
- Honors Award for his overall work from the Naaman House of Culture in Lebanon 2007.
- Certificate of appreciation from Abi Dhabi Culture and Heritage Authority for media participation in the 2008 "Million poet" festival and competition.
- State Award in Literature, children's poetry for his Diwan "Street Trees are my sisters" in 2008.
- Dubai cultural magazine-Dubai 2009.
- The Egyptian writers conference 2009.
- The Arab Union for electronic media 2010.
- The eighth Sharjah Arab poetry forum 2010.
- The General Authority for palaces of culture 2016.
- Shumoukh International School in Oman 2017.
- State award for excellence in literature 2019.
