= Magdy Younes =

Canadian physician and researcher (born 1939)

- Born: July 30, 1939 (age 87); Damanhur, Egypt
- Education: Medical degree PhD in respiratory physiology
- Alma mater: Alexandria University; McGill University
- Occupations: Physician and Researcher

Magdy Kherallah Younes is a Canadian physician and researcher specializing in respirology and sleep medicine. His major areas of focus include reflex control of breathing during exercise, sleep and mechanical ventilation; pathogenesis of respiratory failure; patient-ventilator interactions; hemodynamics of pulmonary circulation; pathogenesis of obstructive sleep apnea; and determination of novel biomarkers in the electroencephalogram (EEG). He is the inventor of several novel approaches to diagnosis and treatment, including Proportional Assist Ventilation (PAV), methods for non-invasive determination of passive respiratory mechanics during assisted ventilation, and Odds Ratio Product of sleep (ORP). These approaches have led to the development of several medical devices, including the Winnipeg Ventilator.

== Life, career and research ==
Younes was born July 30, 1939, in Damanhur, Egypt. He obtained his medical degree from Alexandria University, immigrating to Canada in 1964 and obtaining his clinical training in internal medicine and respiratory medicine at McGill University hospitals in Montreal. This was followed by a PhD in respiratory physiology at McGill University.

Younes subsequently held academic appointments as a clinician-scientist in the departments of Medicine at McGill University, University of Texas Medical Branch, Dalhousie University and the University of Manitoba. He was the Head of Respiratory Medicine at the University of Manitoba 1988-1997 and Director of the sleep laboratory at the Health Sciences Center 1991–2001. During his tenure at the University of Manitoba he began developing the Winnipeg Ventilator, PAV and other novel approaches to respiratory diagnosis and treatment. He retired from active practice and full-time academia in 2001 and is currently Distinguished Professor Emeritus at the University of Manitoba.

Younes's research in respirology, critical care medicine and sleep medicine has resulted in nearly 200 original peer-reviewed papers, book chapters and reviews, as well as numerous patents.

== Selected publications ==
- Younes, M. (January 1992) "Proportional assist ventilation, a new approach to ventilatory support. Theory". American Review of Respiratory Disease. 145 (1): 114-20. doi:10.1164/ajrccm/145.1.114. PMID 1731573.
- Younes, M.; Ostrowski, M.; Thompson, W.; Leslie, C.; Shewchuk, W. (April 2001). "Chemical control stability in patients with obstructive sleep apnea". American Journal of Respiratory and Critical Care Medicine. 163 (5): 1181–90. doi:10.1164/ajrccm.163.5.2007013. PMID 11316657.
- Younes, M. (March 1, 2004). “Role of arousals in the pathogenesis of obstructive sleep apnea”. American Journal of Respiratory and Critical Care Medicine. 169 (5): 623–33. doi:10.1164/rccm.200307-1023OC. PMID 14684560.
- Younes, M. (September 15, 2003). "Contributions of upper airway mechanics and control mechanisms to severity of obstructive apnea". American Journal of Respiratory and Critical Care Medicine. 168 (6): 645–58. doi:10.1164/rccm.200302-201OC. PMID 12773321.
- Younes, M. (November 2008). "Role of respiratory control mechanisms in the pathogenesis of obstructive sleep disorders". Journal of Applied Physiology. 105 (5): 1389–405. doi:10.1152/japplphysiol.90408.2008. PMID 18787092.
- Younes, M.; Ostrowski, M.; Soiferman, M.; Younes, H.; Younes, M.; Raneri, J.; Hanly, P. (April 1, 2015). "Odds Ratio Product of Sleep EEG as a Continuous Measure of Sleep State". Sleep. 38 (4): 641–54. doi:10.5665/sleep.4588. PMID 25348125.
- Younes, M.; Hanly, PJ. (April 1, 2016). "Immediate post-arousal sleep dynamics: An important determinant of sleep stability in obstructive sleep apnea". Journal of Applied Physiology. 120 (7): 801–8. doi:10.1152/japplphysiol.00880.2015. PMID 26718786.
