= Nayer Nagui =

Egyptian composer, conductor and pianist (born 1970)

- ناير ناجي
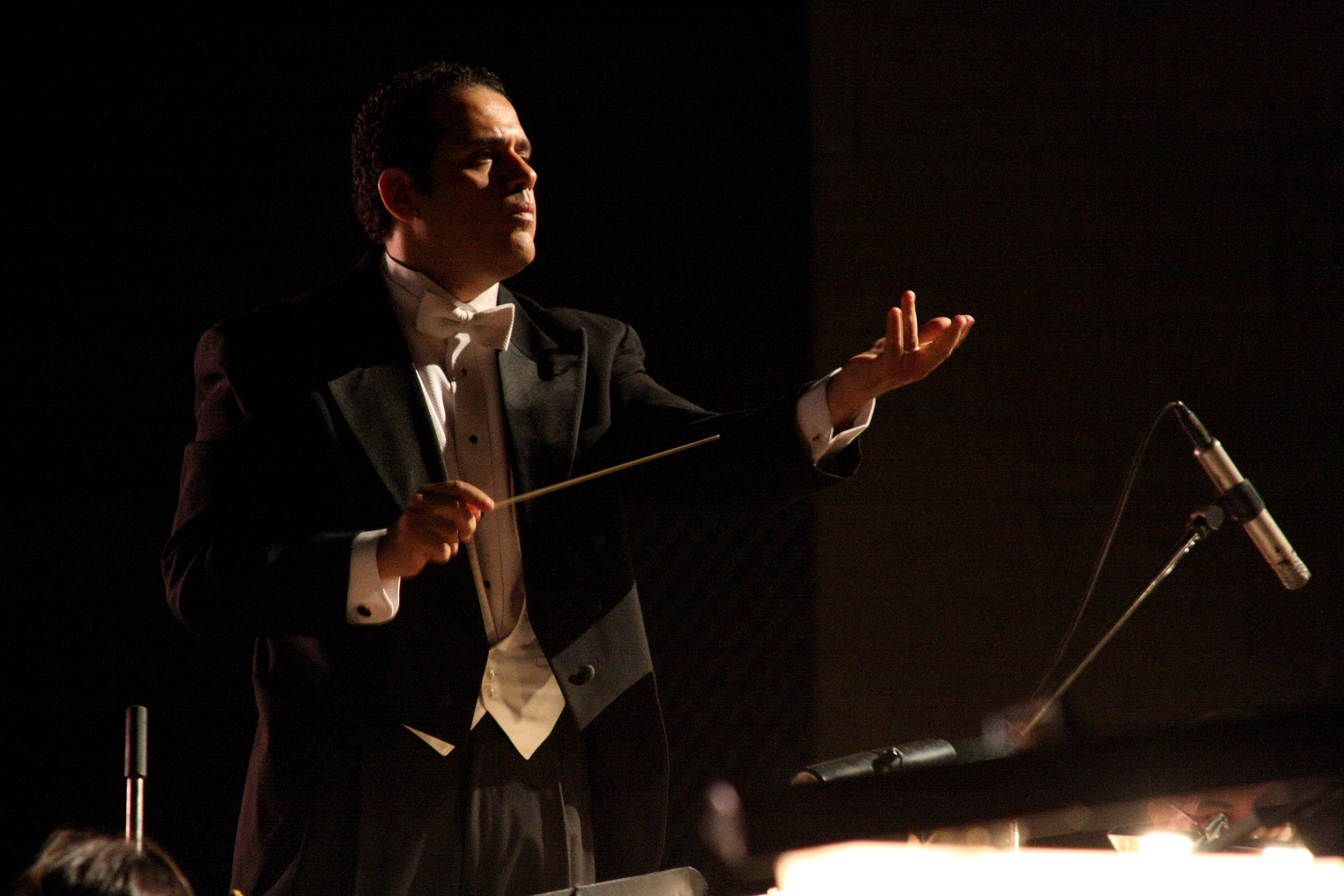
- Born: 1970 (age 54–55); Alexandria, Egypt
- Citizenship: Egyptian
- Education: L'École Normale de Musique de Paris
- Alma mater: Alexandria Conservatoire Royal School of Music of Cairo
- Occupation(s): Conductor, Musical Director, Composer/Arranger
- Organization: Bibliotheca Alexandrina
- Known for: Founded the choir Cairo Celebration Choir (CCC) in 2000, Former Artistic Director & Principal Conductor of the Cairo Opera Orchestra, Principal Conductor of the Bibliotheca Alexandrina Orchestra in Alexandria.

Nayer Nagui (born 1970) is an Egyptian composer, conductor, musical director and pianist. Educated in Egypt, London and Paris, he has led orchestras internationally and frequently conducts the Cairo Symphony Orchestra, among the youngest orchestral directors in Egypt. He is also the musical director of the Cairo Celebration Choir, which he founded.

== Biography ==
Nagui was born in Alexandria in 1970.He attended school in College Saint Marc in Alexandria.He joined the Alexandria Conservatoire where he studied piano under the Italian Professor Herta Pappo. Nayer then furthered his musical studies in Cairo, where he got his Advanced Piano Performing & Music Theory Certificates from the Royal School of Music in 1996 before going on to L'École Normale de Musique de Paris, where he earned a diploma in conducting in 2001 with Prof. Maestro Dominique Rouits.

Conducting in Cairo Opera House during the Spiros Project

His vast repertoire ranges from symphonic, opera, oratorios and ballet conducting to musicals and light music. He conducted Rossini’s 3 comic Operas: Il Signor Bruschino, La Cambiale di Matrimonio, L'occasione fa il ladro, Verdi's Rigoletto, Puccini’s La Boheme as well as highlights from Aida, La Traviata and Il Barbiere di Siviglia. He also conducted Prokofiev's ballet Romeo & Juliet and Ravel's Bolero. His Oratorios repertoire includes Mozart, Brahms, and Fauré Requiems as well as Rossini’s Petite Messe Solennelle and Schubert Stabat Mater. Nayer is also the musical director, founder and conductor of the Cairo Celebration Choir, a choir of more than 120 members. Nayer is a conductor at Cairo Opera House, recently the Chief Conductor of Cairo Conservatory Orchestras.

Since 2004, he has been sharing the baton with the French Conductor Michel Piquemal, in conducting the “Coro de Tres Culturas” in the Moroccan "Festival de printemps des Alizes". In addition to his yearly program with Cairo Symphony Orchestra, Cairo Opera Orchestra and Bibliotheca Alexandrina Orchestra in Egypt, he also conducted many orchestras and choirs around the world: He has conducted the Lecce Symphony Orchestra and Calabria Chamber Orchestra in Italy, the Algerian Symphony Orchestra in Algeria and the Moroccan Philharmonic Orchestra in El Rabat, Casablanca and El Suera, The German Bonner Vocalisten Choir, The European Camerata from the U.K, as well as, Ensemble Georges Solti from Hungary. Nagui has played the piano at the Cairo Conservatoire and the Cairo Opera House and has also performed as accompanist in Egypt, Lebanon, Italy, Belgium and France. He has also played the piano in the band Sobhi and Friends with Sobhi Bedair.

As a composer, Nagui wrote many compositions and arrangements for choir, orchestra and soloists, performed in Egypt and in several international festivals around the world, amongst them the music for the celebration convened by the Ministry of Culture marking the Golden Jubilee of the nationalization of Suez Canal. Nayer is a musical director of Disney's dubbing animation in Arabic language and he has coached performers for Arabic translations of Disney productions.
