= Cairo Celebration Choir =

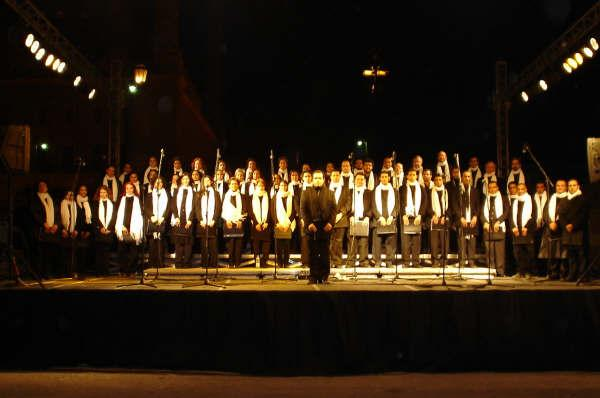
The Cairo Celebration Choir at the Citadel during the Gregorian Chants

The Cairo Celebration Choir (CCC) was founded in 2000 by Nayer Nagui when Dr. Sobhi Bidair was the director of the Cairo Opera House Company at that time. The main idea of forming the choir was to perform a Christmas Concert with the Cairo Opera House soloists and orchestra in the annual Opera House Christmas Concert.

Its first Christmas Concert performed a repertory of Christmas songs adapted, orchestrated and arranged by Maestro Nayer Nagui. Since then the choir has grown in number comprising more than 120 members of diverse nationalities who are affiliated with numerous Cairo music academics and societies.

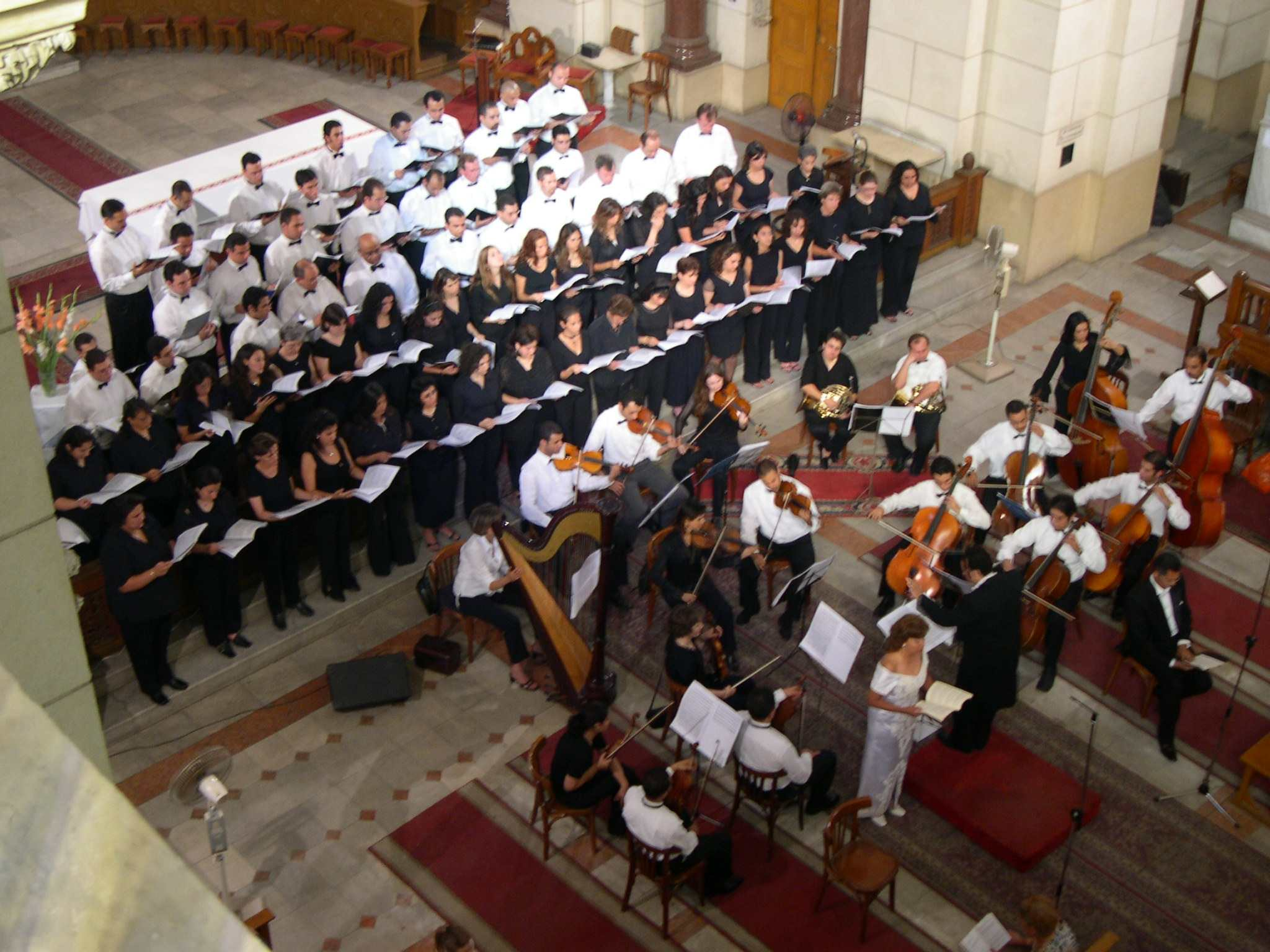
Cairo Celebration Choir in Basilique Church in Cairo, Egypt during their performance of the Faure Requiem in June 2004

The Cairo Celebration Choir recorded Mozart’s Ave Verum conducted by Sherif Mohi ElDin as part of the Mozart CD selection of the Bibliotheca Alexandrina. The choir also sang a selection of musicals in the opening of the 30th Cairo International Film Festival in 2006. Many members of the Cairo Celebration Choir joined the A Capella Choir (Cairo Opera House Official Choir) in March 2006 for the performance of Gustav Mahler's Second Symphony known as the "Resurrection" under the baton of Gilbert Kaplan.

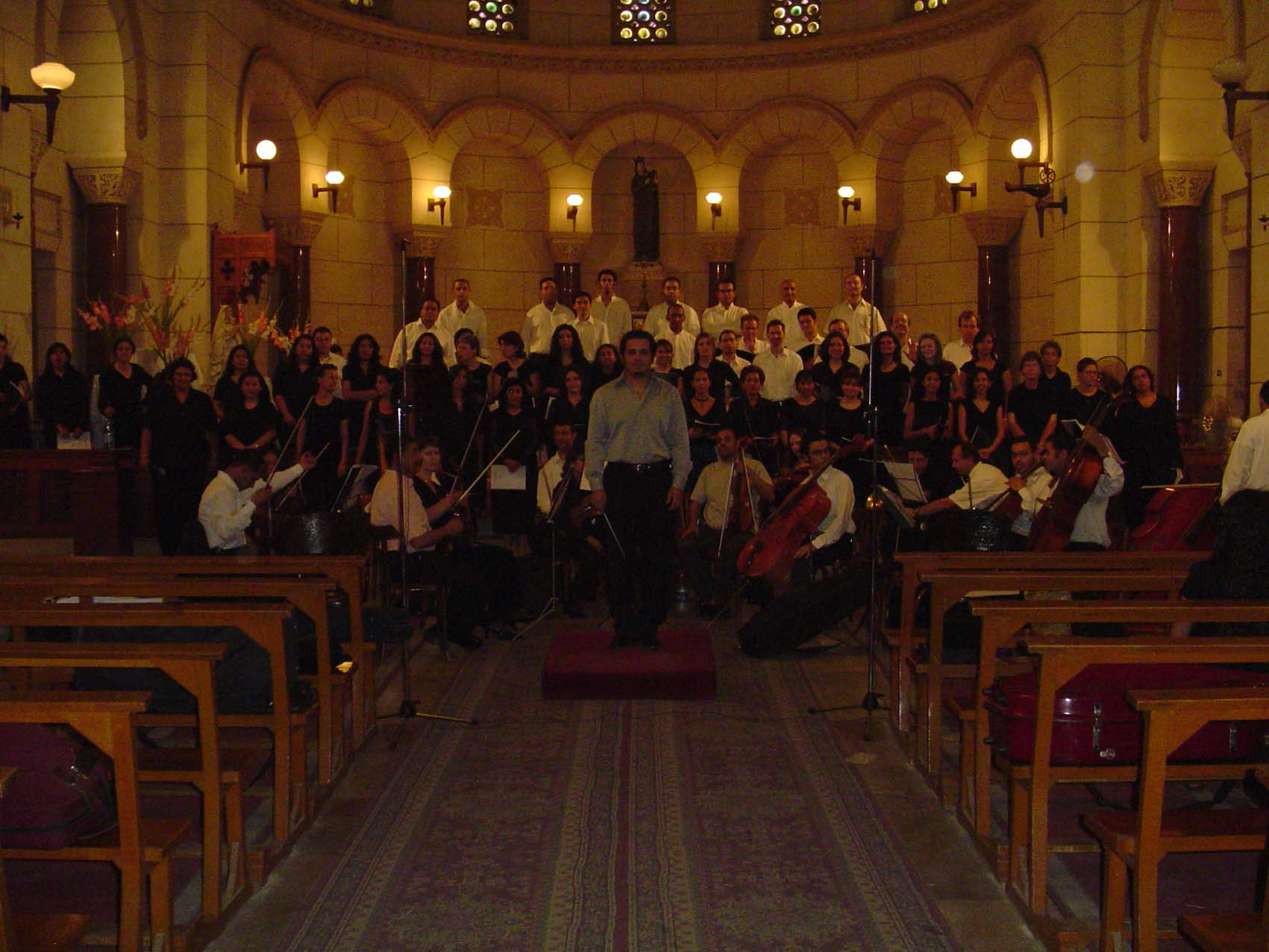
Nayer Nagui with Cairo Celebration Choir during Faure Requiem rehearsal in 2004

== Sources ==
Cairo Celebration Choir - History webpage Sublime resurrection - Al Ahram Weekly
