= Hassaballah El Kafrawy =

Egyptian engineer (1930–2021)

Hasaballah Elkafrawi (حسب الله الكفراوى; 22 November 1930 – 5 August 2021) was an Egyptian engineer and politician who served as governor, Minister of Housing, and as a member of parliament.

== Early life and education ==
Elkafrawi was born in Kafr Saad, Egypt, on 22 November 1930. In 1955, Elkafrawi graduated from the Faculty of Engineering, Alexandria University, with a B.Sc. in Civil Engineering.

== Career ==
El Kafrawy started his career by working for the Ministry of Irrigation. It was in 1958 when he was commissioned to become an engineer in the first stage of the High Dam construction project. He spent almost seven years in this national giant project during which he had the chance to work under the direct supervision of the then prominent Minister of the High dam Sadki Soliman (later a prime minister). Based upon his performance during that period, from 1958 to 1964, El Kafrawy was promoted to become a senior engineer. Moreover, he was recognized in 1964 by both the Egyptian government and Soviet Union. He was awarded the Order of Merit (First Class) of the Egyptian government as well as the Order of the Red Flag for Labor of the Soviet government.

From 1964 to 1967, El Kafrawy moved to supervise the installation of the first high-voltage transmission line, 500 K.V. from Aswan City to Souhag City, including its substations. In 1967, he was promoted to become an Executive Director and Member in the Board of Directors, the Electro-mechanical Company “Kahromica”, Ministry of Electricity. In 1974, following 1973 War, he was selected to become a Vice-Chairman and Chairman of the Executive Organization for Reconstruction, Suez Canal Zone. From 1974 to 1976, he worked in the reconstruction of the Canal Zone. Accordingly, he received the 1975 Order of Merit (First Class) of the Egyptian Government for the second time.

Between November 1976 to May 1977, El Kafrawy was appointed a Governor for Damietta Governorate, his hometown. Despite the short period, he was able to bring about a major change in the quality of the public services in the Governorate. Thus, he gained a strong confidence from both the local community and the Egyptian Cabinet. He was invited to join the National Democratic Party and became a member of parliament for Damietta for about 17 years, until 1993.

In May 1977, he became a Deputy Minister of Housing and Reconstruction until October 1977 when President Anwar Sadat appointed him to become minister. El Kafrawy's initiatives as a minister encouraged the Egyptian presidency to support his attendance in the consecutive 5 cabinets until October 1993.

Over 16 years in the office, El Kafrawy was assigned a number of responsibilities. El Kafrawy was founding chairman of the New Urban Communities Authority (NUCA) in 1979, tasked with implementing the New Cities program. He was also responsible for the desert land reclamation program for a decade. His tireless efforts in tackling these responsibilities gained local and international admiration. In 1980, the Egyptian Government awarded him the Order of Republic (First Class) for the third time. Three years later, the French government awarded him the French Order of Merit (First Class). Finally, the United Nations Center for Human Settlements announced him the winner of 1992 Habitat Prize for his collective achievements in housing and new communities.

In 1993, he decided to resign at the “high point” of his career. Some analysts attributed his resignation to his increasingly uncomfortable position of supporting the policies of the Cabinet which were denounced by many Egyptians at that time. The analysts also said that he was so exhausted to pursue his main goals.

In 1994, following his resignation, President Hosni Mubarak awarded him the Order of Honor “The Nile Wishah”, the highest Egyptian order.
