= Mohamed Hashish =

Egyptian-American scientist and inventor (born 1947)

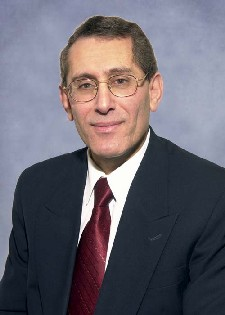
- Born: May 22, 1947 (age 79); Alexandria, Egypt
- Education: University of Alexandria, Concordia University
- Occupation: Research scientist
- Spouse: Nadia Afifi
- Scientific career
- Fields: Mechanical Engineering

Mohamed Hashish (born May 22, 1947) is an Egyptian-American research scientist.

== Youth and schooling ==
Dr Mohamed Hashish was born in Alexandria, Egypt to Ahmed Hashish and Zeinab Amin. Mohamed Hashish completed his elementary and high school education in Kafr El Dawwar. He subsequently attended the Faculty of Engineering, Alexandria University where he obtained a B.Sc. in mechanical engineering with honors. After serving as a teaching assistant for three years in the same department, 25-year-old Mohamed Hashish accepted a scholarship offer from Concordia University in Montreal, Quebec, Canada. There, Mohamed earned his PhD in mechanical engineering. His thesis was on the theory of waterjet cutting.

== Flow International ==
Hashish joined Flow Research Inc., now Flow International Corporation in Kent, Washington, U.S., as a research scientist, in early 1979. Hashish has filed over 130 patents to date to further improve and enhance the performance of waterjet cutting systems. The University of Washington department of Mechanical Engineering appointed him as an affiliate professor of Mechanical Engineering.

== Personal life ==
Mohamed was married in 1979 to Nadia Afifi, Doctor of Dental Surgery. Mohamed and Nadia have two children, Ameer and Rami Hashish.
