= Collège Saint Marc, Alexandria =

Coordinates: 31.21067°N 29.91783°E

St. Marc School
- Collège Saint Marc

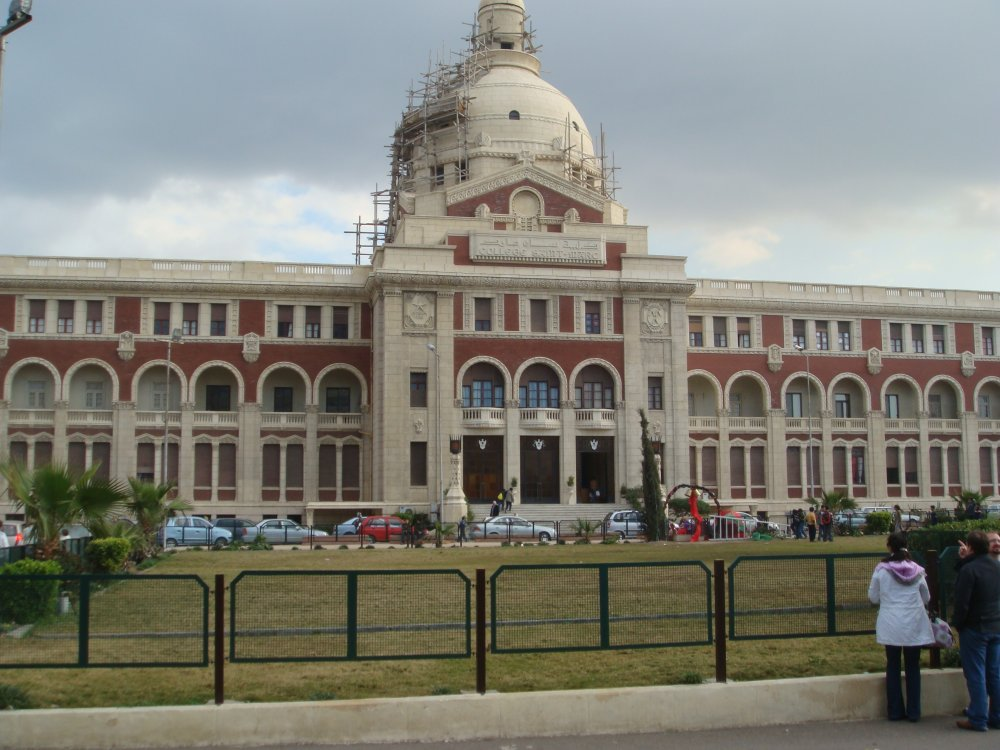
- El Shatby, Alexandria; Egypt

Information
- Type: Private all male
- Religious affiliations: Roman Catholic (De La Salle Brothers)
- Established: 6 October 1928 (97 years ago)
- Head of school: Mr youssef Khalil
- Grades: KG1 – 12
- Gender: Male
- Enrollment: Approx. 2,800
- Language: French
- Campus size: 35,726 sq. m.
- Website: www.saint-marc.ws

Collège Saint Marc is an all-male French Catholic school in Alexandria, Egypt. The school is located in the Shatby neighborhood in central Alexandria.

Collège Saint Marc was founded in 1928 by the De La Salle Brothers to be the second Lassalian school in Alexandria after École Saint Gabriel. Collège Saint Marc was inaugurated on 6 October 1928, by King Fuad I. Built on an area of 35,726 m2, it was at the time of its inauguration the largest educational institution in the Middle East.

Collège Saint Marc is a private educational institution with French as its main teaching language, along with Arabic. Students must be accepted beginning at KG1, and successful students remain in the school until they receive their high school diploma. The curriculum at Collège Saint Marc prepares the students for the Egyptian Baccalaureate examination.

== Heads of school ==
1. Br. Pierre Cyprien, FSC (1928–1931)
2. Br. Léonce Onésime, FSC (1931–1937)
3. Br. Hippolyte Itale, FSC (1937–1939)
4. Br. Gustave Astier, FSC (1939–1940)
5. Br. Hippolyte Itale, FSC (1940–1946)
6. Br. Antonin Louis, FSC (1946–1947)
7. Br. Léon André, FSC (1947–1948)
8. Br. Antonin Louis, FSC (1948–1956)
9. Br. Adrien Polycarpe, FSC (1956–1961)
10. Br. Castanié Ildefonse, FSC (1961–1962)
11. Br. Gabr Saadé, FSC (1961–1962)
12. Br. Emile El Masri, FSC (1962–1963)
13. Br. Jacques Boulad, FSC (1962–1979)
14. Br. Michel Andrejko, FSC (1979–1983)
15. Br. Régis Robbe, FSC (1983–1985)
16. Br. Jacques Boulad, FSC (1985–1992)
17. Br. Régis Robbe, FSC (1992–1995)
18. Br. Georges Absi, FSC (1995–2003)
19. Mr. Waguih Hanna Elias (2003–2024)
20. Mr.Amir Stephan (2024–present)

== Notable alumni ==
- Dodi Al-Fayed – Egyptian film producer, partner of Princess Diana
- Esmat Abdel Meguid – former Foreign Minister of Egypt and former Secretary-General of the Arab League
- Roshdi Abaza – Egyptian actor Born in 03.08.1926
- Mohamed El Shorbagy – World Champion and World No. 1 Squash player
- Nayer Nagui – Egyptian composer, conductor, musical director and pianist.
- Rachid Mohamed Rachid – a businessman and former Egyptian Minister of Industry and Trade.
- Azer Bestavros – Computer scientist and professor at Boston University.

== See also ==
- Educational institutions in Alexandria

== College Bulletin ==
Lotus No 82 Collège Saint Marc, Alexandria LOTUS 1975–1976 p231

- LOTUS No 82 1975–1976 P231
