= Elli Beny W Benak =

Studio album by Jannat
- Released: 2006
- Recorded: 2005–2006
- Genre: Arabic pop
- Length: 40:42
- Label: GoodNews4Music
- Producer: Ahmed Desouki

Jannat chronology
Elli Beny W Benak (2006)	Hob Emtelak (2009)

Elli Beny W Benak (Egyptian Arabic: اللى بينى و بينك, "what's between me and you") is the first studio album by Moroccan singer Jannat, released on July 12, 2006, under Egyptian label GoodNews4Music.

== Track listing ==
#	Title	Composer	Arranger	Lyricist
1	Aktar Men Sana	Mohamed Yehia	Ahmed Adel	Nader Abdallah
2	Bahebbak	Mohamed Rahim	Mohamed Rahim / Afraim	Khaled Amin
3	Gideed	Mohamed Yehia	Wesam Mumtaz	Ayman Bahgat Amar
4	Kelmet Bahebbek	Mohamed Yehia	Anwar Amr	Hassan Attia
5	Lahza	Mohamed Refai	Medhat Khemis	Mohamed Refai
6	Menni Leek	Khaled Ezz	Khaled Ezz	Khaled Taj Eddin
7	W Edert Teb'ed	Khaled Ezz	Medhat Khemis	Amir Teima
8	Betmor Bi Azmah	Ashraf Salem	Anwar Amr	Ahmed Abdallah
9	Elli Beny W Benak	Mohamed Rahim	Afraim	Khaled Moner / Nader Abdallah
10	Mageetsh Leh	Sherif Taj	Medhat Khemis	Nader Abdallah

- While visiting Dubai city, beginning June 2009 to promote her new album Hob Emtelak, Jannat received a EMI Golden Disk Award for her album Elli Beny W Benak.
