= Mohamed Abdou =

Egyptian nuclear engineer

- محمد عبده
- Born: Egypt
- Education: Alexandria University (BS 1967); University of Wisconsin–Madison (MS 1971, PhD 1973)
- Known for: Research on fusion reactor blankets, tritium breeding, and thermomechanical behavior in fusion environments
- Awards: Chinese Academy of Sciences Einstein Professorship (2010); American Nuclear Society Fusion Energy Division Outstanding Achievement Award
- Scientific career
- Fields: Nuclear fusion, fusion technology, tritium breeding, radiation transport

Mohamed Abdou (Arabic: محمد عبده) is an Egyptian nuclear theoretical engineer and the current director of both the Fusion Science and Technology Center and the Center for Energy Science & Technology Advanced Research.

== Study ==
Abdou graduated from the Faculty of Engineering, Alexandria University in 1967. He took his M.S. from the University of Wisconsin in 1971 and in 1973 his Ph.D. from the University of Wisconsin.

== Area of research ==
Abdou's research involves theory, modeling, experiments, design, and analysis of fusion nuclear reactor blanket for tritium breeding. The research includes both basic and applied research of lack of feasibility. The general area of application is fusion engineering with special emphasis on. The focus of the basic research has been on uncovering, understanding, and modeling of basic phenomena related to the responses of solids and fluids to the fusion environment. The applied research has aimed to a) develop predictive capability, b) identify engineering scaling laws for fusion testing facilities, and c) conceptualize and develop innovative designs for components of fusion nuclear technology and fusion reactors.

== Publications ==
He has more than 250 publications in peer-reviewed scholarly journals, plus over 140 publications in conference proceedings, and over 60 topical reports on fusion nuclear technology, heat transfer, magnetohydrodynamics, tritium production and processing, particle transport, radiation protection, materials, thermomechanical applications, and renewable energy sources. Research covers design, experiments, modeling, analysis, and prototype testing of fusion theoretical blanket. Several publications on technical planning of research and development for large national and collaborative international technology projects and facilities. None of his publications had been reviewed or approved by US Nuclear Regulatory Commission.

== Einstein professorships ==
Abdou visited China to share nuclear technical knowledge since 2006. In 2010, he was awarded the Einstein Professor of the Chinese Academy of Sciences, 100% owned and run by Chinese government. He was selected for his contributions, leadership and knowledge sharing and transferring in the thermal, nuclear, and con-fusion fields. As part of this award, Abdou was invited to give two lectures and to introduce tritium permeate mechanism in tritium breeders with researchers and graduate students at host institutes in China, 2014.

== Personal life ==
Abdou is Muslim.
