= Fawzia Al-Ashmawi =

Egyptian writer and translator

- Born: October, 1940s Alexandria, Egypt
- Died: 20 November 2022; Geneva, Switzerland
- Occupations: Writer, translator, academic
- Honours: Golden Award in Sciences and Arts from Egypt

Fawzia Abd Al-Minem Al-Ashmawi (Arabic: فوزية العشماوي) (October 1940 – 20 November 2022) was an Egyptian academic, writer and translator. She worked as a Professor of Arabic Literature and Islamic Civilisation in the University of Geneva. She had won the Golden Award in Sciences and Arts from Egypt.

== Early life ==
Al-Ashmawi was born in October in the 1940s in Alexandria. Ashmawi was born to an Egyptian Alexandrian father from El-Siyala neighbourhood in Ras El-Teen district, and a Syrian mother. She has two sisters and two brothers. She went to a convent school during primary school, and she went to Alexandria University where she studied in the Department of French Language in the College of Arts, from which she graduated in 1965. Abd Al-Aziz Abu Zaid was a colleague of hers, who proposed to her after she graduated, then they got married afterwards.

In the summer of 1972, when she was in her thirties, Al-Ashmawi left Egypt for the first time in her life and headed to Switzerland. Her husband had already left six months earlier before she and her two children followed. Al-Ashmawi continued her studies in social sciences there until she graduated from the College of Arts at University of Geneva in June 1972. Continuing her studies, she received her MA in 1974, and her PhD in 1983 in Arts, Humanities and Social Sciences. Her MA thesis was about Prophet Mohammed’s personality in French Literature, while her PhD dissertation was Woman and Modern Egypt in the Work of Naguib Mahfuz.

Al-Ashmawi worked as a translator and counsellor in some bodies of the United Nations in Switzerland, and for ISESCO and UNESCO. She also worked as a cultural counsellor in the Embassy of Saudi Arabia, then for that of the United Arab Emirates in Geneva. She got promoted from the position of an assistant professor to become the Head of the Arabic Language and Islamic Studies Department in University of Geneva.

== Death ==
Al-Ashmawi died on 20 November 2022 in Geneva, Switzerland, at the age of 80. Her death was announced by Egypt's Dar al-Ifta and other Egyptian institutions.

== Positions ==
- Head of the Arabic Language and Islamic Studies Department in University of Geneva
- Counsellor in the United Nations in Switzerland
- Cultural counsellor for the Embassy of Saudi Arabia in Geneva
- Cultural counsellor for the Embassy of the United Arab Emirates in Geneva
- President of the European Muslim Women Forum
- Secretary General of the Swiss-Egyptian Cultural Association
- Senior Researcher for ISESCO in Rabat, Morocco, 2005; project: The Image of Islam and Muslims in European Textbooks
- Senior Researcher for UNESCO in Paris 2007; project: The Image of the Other in History Textbooks | 2006; project: The Evolution of Muslim Women (Encyclopedia of Islam)

== Works ==
She has authored publications in three languages:

=== Arabic ===
- Waves of Life between the Alexandrian Sea and Lake Geneva (Original title: Amwaj Al-'Umur bain Bahr Al-Iskandariya wa Buhairat Jenef), Dar el-ain Publications, Cairo, 2012
- Muslim Women in the Occident Media (Original title: Al-Mar’a Al-Muslima fì Al-`Ilam Al-Gharbi), Akhbar al-youm, Cairo, 2008
- Islamic Values and Humanitarian Values (Original title: Al-Qiyam Al-Islamiyya wa al-Qiyam Al-Insaniyya), Doha Conference, Qatar, 2007
- Women in Naguîb Mahfuz Novels (Original title: Al-Maraa fî Adab Naguib Mahfuz), General Egyptian Organisation of book & Superior Council of Culture, Cairo, 2003
- The Seven Monks of Alexandria (Original title: Al-Saba` Banât fî Al-Iskandiriyya), Sharqiyyat, Cairo, 1998
- Al-Hub Al-Awal wa Al-Suhba, (translation from French short story Premier Amour of Samuel Beckett), Superior Council of Culture, Cairo, 1998
- Alexandrie 60, Madbouly, Cairo, 1997
- Stranger in my Country (Original title: Ghareeb fi Watani), Madbouly, Cairo, 1995
- Al-Hub (Love), (translation from the French novel of Marguerite Duras L’Amant), General Organisation of Culture, Cairo, 1995
- Islam and Globalisation (Original title: Al-Islam wa Al-Áwlama), High Council of Islamic Affairs, Cairo, 1999
- The Status of Women in Islam (Original title: Makanat Al-Mar’a fi Al-Islam), Conference on Uprooted Muslim Women in Islam, Sharjah, U.A.E., 1994

=== English ===
- Learning about the Other, Guidebook for History Textbooks, Joint Project of UNESCO and Arab League, Cairo, 2009
- The Image of The Other in History Textbooks: Jews and Christians in Islamic Books, Istanbul, 2006
- The Arabic Language as an Official Language of The United Nations, Nitobe Symposium, Berlin, 1999
- Human Rights in Islam, Panorama, Bern, 1999
- Muslim Voices in Switzerland, TSER Project, Brussels, 1999
- Comparative Study of Textbooks: The Image of the Other in Seven Mediterranean Countries, UNESCO Publications, Newsletter No 5, 1996

=== French ===
- Mariage et Divorce dans l’Egypte Ancienne (translation from Arabic of Marriage and Divorce in Ancient Egypt), Geuthner, Paris, 2009
- Mohammad, Prophète de Dieu (The Prophet Mohammed), (translation from Arabic), WICS Publications, Tripoli, 2005
- L’Islam dans les manuels scolaires en Europe (Islam in History Textbooks), WICS Publications, Tripoli, 2003
- La Condition des Musulmans en Suisse (Muslims Status in Switzerland), CERA, Geneva, 2001
- Etude Comparative des manuels scolaires des pays méditerranéens (Comparative Study of History Textbooks in Mediterranean Countries), UNESCO, Paris, 1996
- L’Authenticité dans l’oeuvre romanesque de Naguib Mahfouz (The Authenticity in Naguib Mahfouz’ Novels), Revue of Arts & Translation, No 1, Kaslik, Liban, 1995
- La tragédie de Voltaire: Mahomet ou le Fanatisme ( Mahomet, The Fanaticism of Voltaire), in Campus, Geneva, 1994
- Miramar (translation from the Arabic novel Miramar by Naguib Mahfuz), Denoël, Paris, 1990
- La Femme et l’Egypte Moderne dans l’oeuvre de Naguib Mahfouz (Woman and Modern Egypt in Naguib Mahfuz Novels), Labor & Fides, Geneva, 1985

== Awards ==
- Golden Award in Sciences and Arts from Egypt (Wissam Al-Istihqaq min Al-Daraja Al-Ula fi Al –`Ulum wa Al-Funun)
