= Samira Islam =

Saudi pharmacologist

- Education: Alexandria University
- Scientific career
- Fields: Pharmacology
- Workplaces: King Abdulaziz University

Samira Ibrahim Islam (Arabic: سميرة إسلام, romanized: Samīrah Islām) is a Saudi Arabian pharmacologist. She heads King Fahd Medical Research Center's Drug Monitoring Unit at King Abdulaziz University. She was instrumental in securing formal university education for women in Saudi Arabia.

== Early life and education ==
Islam was born in al-Hafuf, al-Ahsaa, Saudi Arabia. Following her secondary education, Islam was sent to Egypt to finish her schooling. She initially enrolled at the Medical School at Alexandria University but transferred to the School of Pharmacy after a year. Here she obtained a BSc in pharmacy and pharmaceutical sciences in 1964, followed by a Masters in 1966. Islam continued to study pharmacology, becoming the first Saudi woman to earn a PhD in 1970.

== Career ==
In 1971, Islam began to lecture at King Abdulaziz University. She was appointed Academic Advisor for the girl's section of the Makkah and Jeddah branches of the university in 1973. She worked to establish formal university education for Saudi women. She became Vice Dean of the Faculty of Medicine in 1974. In 1983, she was appointed as Professor of Pharmacology, becoming the first person from Saudi Arabia to achieve this.

Islam has been recognized as an advocate of the nursing profession and founded the first faculty of nursing in Saudi Arabia in 1976.

== Research ==
Islam has investigated drug metabolism as it pertains to the Saudi population. She founded and heads the Drug Monitoring Unit of King Fahd Medical Research Center at King Abdulaziz University. Islam is on the board of the Arab Science and Technology Foundation.

Islam received a Makkah Award of Excellence for her research on the effects and impact of medication on Saudis.

== See also ==
- Timeline of women in science
