= Mohammed Aboul-Fotouh Hassab =

Egyptian surgeon

Mahammad Aboul-Fotouh Hassab
- Born: 3 December 1913; Sohag Governorate, Khedivate of Egypt
- Died: 2000 (aged 86–87); Egypt
- Education: Cairo University
- Known for: Description of his operation Hassab's decongestion operation for the treatment of oesophageal varices as a result of portal hypertension
- Spouse: Hayat Nour
- Children: 3: Amina; Hossam el-Din; Hoda
- Medical career
- Profession: Surgeon
- Institutions: Cairo University; Alexandria University
- Sub-specialties: Gastroenterology
- Awards: First Class Order of Science; Two medals of appreciation

Mohammed Aboul-Fotouh Hassab (Egyptian Arabic: محمد أبو الفتوح حساب) (2 December 1913 – 2000) was an Egyptian gastro-intestinal surgeon. He is known for the description of his operation Hassab's decongestion operation for the treatment of oesophageal varices as a result of portal hypertension. Hassab was one of the surgery professors in medical school at Alexandria University in Egypt.

== Life and academic progress ==
Hassab was born in Sohag Governorate on December 2, 1913. He obtained a Bachelor's degree in Medicine and Surgery in 1940, then a diploma in 1943 and a Master's degree in 1946 from Cairo University. He rose through the ranks of the teaching staff from clinical teaching assistant in surgery in 1944 to head of surgery departments in 1970. After his retirement, he worked as a full-time professor at Alexandria University since 1974.

He attended many international conferences, and many universities around the world invited him to give lectures.

== Membership in specialized medical associations ==
Hassab was a member of:

- National Committees for Liver Diseases.
- International Association of Surgeons.
- Egyptian Liver Patients Friends Association.
- Egyptian Association of Surgeons.
- Alexandria Medical Association.
- Association of Surgeons in Alexandria.

== Research ==
He has conducted several research studies in the fields of gastrointestinal surgery, hernia, esophageal varicose veins, liver cirrhosis, and leg varicose veins. He also invented a procedure to treat bleeding esophageal varices, which became known by his name in the most important international surgery books (Hassab's decongestion operation).

== Honors and awards ==
Hassab received the First Class Order of Science, and two medals of appreciation from the University of Alexandria and the Kingdom of Saudi Arabia. His name was written in the register of the most famous international figures, and a street in the Smouha neighborhood in the city of Alexandria was named after him.

== Family ==
Hassab married Mrs. Hayat Nour, and they had three children:

- Amina (before her death in November 2014, she was a professor of ophthalmology at the Alexandria Faculty of Medicine).
- Hossam El-Din (Professor of General Surgery at Alexandria Faculty of Medicine).
- Hoda (Professor of Pediatrics at Alexandria Faculty of Medicine).

== Sources ==
- الموسوعة القومية للشخصيات المصرية البارزة ج2
- EGYNEWS.NET
- Alexandria medical school
