= Azer Bestavros =

American computer scientist

Azer Bestavros (Coptic: Ⲁⲍⲉⲣ Ⲡⲓⲥⲧⲁⲩⲣⲟⲥ) (born May 2, 1961), is an Egyptian-American computer scientist. He is the Inaugural Associate Provost for Computing and Data Sciences and the William Fairfield Warren Distinguished Professor of Computer Science at Boston University. Prior to his appointment in 2019 to lead the Faculty of Computing and Data Sciences, he was the Founding Director of The Rafik B. Hariri Institute for Computing and Computational Science & Engineering. He joined Boston University in 1991 as an assistant professor in the Department of Computer Science, which is part of the university's College of Arts & Sciences. He was promoted to the rank of associate professor in 1998 and to the rank of full professor in 2003. From 2000 to 2007, he served as chair of the Department of Computer Science. Prior to joining Boston University, he worked as an instructor, teaching fellow, software engineer, and technical consultant for various organizations and technology companies, including the Eastern Mediterranean Regional Office of World Health Organization, Awad Associates, Harvard University, and AT&T Research Laboratories.

== Education and career ==
A Coptic Christian native of Egypt, Bestavros was born and grew up in Alexandria, where he attended Collège Saint Marc, graduating in 1979 on top of his class, ranking third over 27,357 students in Egypt’s nationwide diploma exam. In 1984, Bestavros obtained a baccalaureate of science with summa cum laude honors in computer engineering from Alexandria University in Alexandria, Egypt, where he continued his studies, earning a master of science in computer engineering and digital control in 1987. While pursuing his M.Sc., he also served as an instructor of computer science at Alexandria University (1984–1987). In 1987, he joined the graduate program at Harvard University as a research fellow, earning a Master of Arts in computer science in 1988. Four years later, he received his Ph.D. in computer science from Harvard University, under Thomas E. Cheatham, one of the "roots" of the academic genealogy of applied computer scientists. While studying at Harvard University, he also served as computer science teaching fellow (1989–1990), resident host of Harvard's historic Dana-Palmer House (1990–1994), and as a computer science resident tutor at Leverett House (1994–1998).

After receiving his doctorate degree, Bestavros crossed the Charles River to join Boston University as an assistant professor in the Department of Computer Science in the College of Arts & Sciences. He was promoted to the ranks of associate professor in 1998, and full professor in 2003. He chaired the department for seven years (2000–2007), overseeing a period of significant growth, culminating in the Chronicle of Higher Education's highest ranking of the department as 7th in the US in terms of its scholarly productivity. His academic appointments also include visiting professorships at Harvard University (1999–2000), at Institut Eurecom in Sophia-Antipolis, France (2008), Federal University of Minas Gerais, Brazil (2012), American University in Beirut, Lebanon (2017), KTH Royal Institute of Technology in Stockholm, Sweden (2018), and American University in Cairo, Egypt (2018).

In 2010, Bestavros was tapped to serve as the founding director of The Rafik B. Hariri Institute for Computing and Computational Science & Engineering at Boston University. Inaugurated in 2012, the institute serves the BU computing community by incubating collaborative, cross-disciplinary research and training initiatives, and by supporting a federation of research laboratories and centers. In his capacity as director of the Hariri Institute, Bestavros led BU's faculty involvement in the conception of the Massachusetts Green High-Performance Computing Center (MGHPCC), which provides world-class computational infrastructure, serving as its co-chair of its Research, Education, and Outreach working group since 2010. As co-chair of the Council on Educational Technology & Learning Innovation, Bestavros supported the successful incubation of the Digital Learning Initiative, which has matured and joined with additional university units to form the BU’s Digital Learning & Innovation group. Other leadership roles that he took on as Director of the Hariri Institute include his chairing of the BU Data Science Initiative, launched in 2014 to expand the university's data science footprint, and his co-chairing of the Data Science Task Force charged in 2018 with developing a university strategy for advancing BU’s capabilities as a research and education leader in computing and data sciences.

In 2019, Bestavros was tapped to lead the Faculty of Computing & Data Sciences (CDS) at BU, serving as the university's inaugural Associate Provost for Computing and Data Sciences. The Faculty of CDS is a university-wide academic unit that serves as an interface between traditional academic departments and faculty and students interested in computing and data sciences.

Beyond academia, Bestavros engaged in number of professional activities, as consultant, scientist, and technical advisor for a wide variety of organizations, including Microsoft Research Labs in Cairo, Egypt, Telefónica Labs in Barcelona, Spain, AT&T Bell Labs in Holmdel, New Jersey, Bowne Internet Solutions in Cambridge, Massachusetts, and Sycamore Networks Inc. in Chelmsford, Massachusetts. He is frequently called upon to serve as an expert witness in Intellectual Property and Patent litigation involving networking and software systems. In 2007, he was recognized as the first Computer Science Faculty member to step in and expose the RIAA's technically-bankrupt strategy to intimidate and prosecute undergraduate students accused of illegal file sharing. Earlier in his career, from 1983 to 1987, he worked in Alexandria, Egypt, as a software engineer at Awad Associates and as a data analyst at the Mediterranean Regional Office of the World Health Organization.

== Research areas, projects and publications ==
Bestavros's research focuses on networking, distributed computing, and high-assurance systems. His seminal contributions include pioneering studies of web push caching through content distribution networks, self-similar Internet traffic characterization, game-theoretic cloud resource management, and safety certification of networked systems and software. His current projects include the Modular Approach to Cloud Security (MACS), the Smart-city Cloud-based Open Platform and Ecosystem (SCOPE), the Massachusetts Open Cloud (MOC), and Accessible & Scalable Secure Multiparty Computation.

As of 2019, his research has received over $40 million in funding from government and industry sponsors, which has yielded 19 PhD theses, 8 issued patents, 2 startups, and hundreds of refereed papers with over 20,000 citations. Most recently, his research on privacy-preserving analytics has attracted a lot of attention due to its use in the first-of-its-kind study of the gender wage gap, and its citation as an enabler of US legislation on "Student Right to Know Before You Go Act" as well as "Evidence-Based Policy Making."

Bestavros has a long track record of involvement with and service to the computer science research community. Most notably, he chaired (in 2019) and co-chaired (in 2014) the Committee Committee of Visitors (CoV) for the CISE Directorate of the National Science Foundation, which is charged with reviewing CISE's operation and processes. In 2013, he served on the inaugural advisory board of the congressional Cloud Computing Caucus to raise awareness and educate lawmakers on cloud technologies. From 2005 to 2012, he served as the chair of the IEEE Computer Society TC on the Internet. He is currently on the editorial board for the Communications of the ACM as a co-editor of its Research Highlights, which publishes the most influential and most read articles in the computer science field.

== Honors and awards ==
Throughout his career, Bestavros received a number of awards for distinguished teaching, research, and service, including the ACM Sigmetrics Inaugural Test of Time Award, which is given in recognition of research "whose impact is still felt 10-15 years after its initial publication" and the United Methodist Scholar Teacher Award, which is given in recognition of "outstanding dedication and contributions to the learning arts and to the institution." In 2017, he was named a William Fairfield Warren Distinguished Professor, the highest distinction bestowed upon senior faculty members at Boston University for “representing our community with distinction, enriching the academic experience for our students, and raising our stature as a major research university.”

== Selected bibliography ==
As of 2019, Google Scholar lists over 20,000 citations and 619 patent references to over 400 articles authored or co-authored by Bestavros, with an H-Index of 63, with 40 articles having more than 100 citations each, and with 155 articles having more than 10 citations each.

== Events and media coverage ==
Bestavros has given numerous speeches and talks at events and institutions all over the world and he is often quoted or featured by press and various news media outlet.
