= Faculty of Science, Alexandria University =

Faculty in Alexandria, Egypt

Faculty of Science Alexandria University
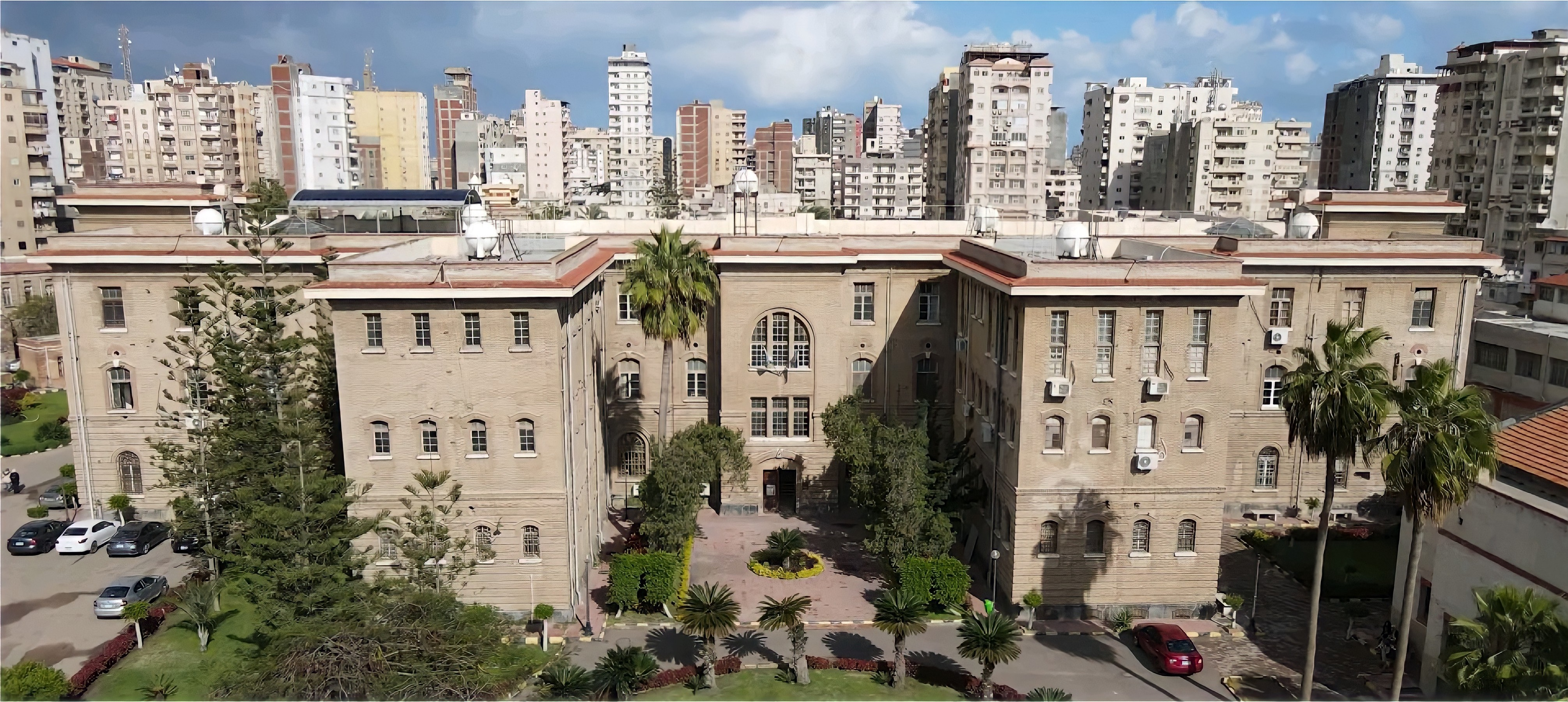
- Administration Building
- Other name: Alex-Sci
- Type: Public
- Established: August 1942
- Affiliations: Alexandria University
- Dean: Amany Abdel-Hamid
- Location: Alexandria, Egypt
- Campus: Urban
- Colors: Blue, Red & Moderate blue
- Website: sci.alexu.edu.eg

The Faculty of Science, Alexandria University (Arabic: كلية العلوم، جامعة الإسكندرية) was established by Dr. Mohamed Ali Hegab in 1942. Since then, departments have been found. Now it contains nine departments distributed among the faculty's buildings.

== Faculty Departments ==
There are three departments in Faculty of Science at Alexandria University, every department has its specializations.

These departments are:

Biological science department

Admits students who have obtained the general secondary education certificate - Science department. After level 1, students are allowed to choose their major specialization according to the list of Credit hours system list applied since the batch of 2008/2009. Specializations are:

- Molecular biology.
- Biotechnology.
- Microbiology.
- Chemistry.
- Biochemistry.
- Botany.
- Zoology.
- Entomology.
- Environmental science.
- General oceanography.

Also, after the fourth semester (level 2), students are allowed to enroll for the minor specialization. This is done according to the supply and demand and the availability of departments. Note that: "Biotechnology" is still closed due to the limited possibilities of the department to achieve sufficiency for major specialization students.

Natural science department

Admits students obtaining the general secondary education certificate - Mathematics department. A major specialization is chosen after level 1 and a minor after level 2. Specializations are:

- Mathematics.
- Statistics.
- Computer science.
- Chemistry.
- Physics.
- Biophysics.
- Physical oceanography.

Also, after the fourth semester, students are allowed to enroll for the minor specialization according to the supply and demand and the availability of the department.

Geological Sciences department

All students obtaining the general secondary education certificate - scientific department can join this department whether they are science department or mathematics department. After level 1, students are allowed to choose their major specialization. Specializations are:

- Chemistry.
- Geology.
- Geophysics.

After the fourth semester, they are allowed to choose their minor according to the supply and demand and the availability of the department.

The department also publishes a monthly bulletin associated with an American association called: "American Association of Petroleum Geologists".

== Faculty Buildings ==
Faculty of Science at Alexandria University has four buildings in different places, every building has its specializations.

These buildings are:

- Moharam Bek building: contains the faculty's HQ and the labs of the departments: mathematics, geology, botany, zoology and biochemistry. Students of final levels of some specializations do their studies there.
- El Shatby building: located Aflton St. and contains the buildings established in the beginning of the sixties, it also contains the computer unit and the Electronic Microscope unit. Students of level 1 and preparatory students do their studies there.
- Horria Road Building: The building is currently demolished and the building was intended for the Department of Chemistry, and also contained the faculty's HQ and the labs of the departments: mathematics, geology, botany, zoology and biochemistry. Most of the final level students from some majors do their studies there.
  Horria Road Building gallery
- El Gomrok (Anfoshi) building: overlooks the eastern port, next to Yacht club. It contains lectures halls and labs associated with oceanography department.
