= Hassab's decongestion operation =

Surgical procedure

- Specialty: Gastroenterology

Hassab's decongestion operation is an elective surgical procedure to treat esophageal varices in patients with portal hypertension as a result of cirrhosis of the liver. It was created by Dr. Mohammed Aboul-Fotouh Hassab, a professor of surgery at Alexandria University in Egypt.

== Procedure ==
The approach is abdominal.

1. Splenectomy
2. Devascularization of the distal 7 cm of the esophagus
3. Devascularization of the proximal part of the stomach
4. Vagotomy and pyeloroplasty
