= Ratiba El-Hefny =

- Birth name: Ratiba El-Hefny
- Born: 2 December 1931; Cairo, Kingdom of Egypt
- Died: 16 September 2013 (aged 81); Cairo, Egypt
- Occupations: Opera singer; Dean of the higher Arab Music Institute Cairo

Ratiba Hefny (Arabic: رتيبة الحفني; 2 December 1931 – 16 September 2013) was an Egyptian international Opera singer (soprano) who performed in more than 500 opera performances. She was the dean of the Higher Institute of Arabic Music in Cairo, and became the director of the Cairo Opera House in 1988.

She grew up in a musical family, her father Mahmoud El Hefny had written more than 45 books on music, and her grandmother, who also was a German opera singer. El-Hefny started playing the piano at the age of five.

El-Hefny gave her singing voice to Snow White in Disney's 1975 Arabic edition of Snow White and the Seven Dwarfs.

== Education ==
- Diploma, Higher Institute for music teachers (College of Music Education at present), in 1950.
- Post-graduate studies in folklore from the Humboldt University of Berlin, from 1954 until 1968.
- Diploma majoring in education and the leadership of the choir of the Institute of operatic singing in Kreiner, Luxembourg, Germany, in 1955.
- The highest qualification specialization in operatic singing from the Higher School of Music in Munich, Germany, in 1955, (the Egyptian equivalent of a doctorate).

== Career ==
- Lecturer at the Graduate Institute for music teachers, in 1950.
- Assignment of the rector at the Institute of Arabic music (Section of girls) in the process of the establishment of the first, in 1951.
- Management of the Deanship of the Institute and was subsequently transferred to the Higher Institute of Arabic music, and in 1962 was appointed to the post of Dean of the Institute after it became a subsidiary of the Ministry of Culture, and the Academy of Arts for 29 years
- President of House of Music and artistic Opera in 1980.
- Reappointment Dean of the Higher Institute of Arabic music, in 1986.
- President of the National Cultural Center (Cairo Opera House) from June 1988 until March 1990.
- Full-time professor of the Academy of Arts (Higher Institute of Arabic music).
- Technical Adviser to the Chairman of the Committee on National Cultural Center (Cairo Opera House).
- President of The Arab Society for Music of the League of Arab States.
- Member of the National Specialized Councils.
- Supervisor of the Center for Talent Development of Cairo Opera House.

== Achievements ==
- Established the first choir children in Egypt, in 1961.
- Umm Kulthum Ensemble for Arabic music.
- Established of religious songs Ensemble.
- Founded the National Arab Music Ensemble.
- Founded Cairo Opera House Children's Choir.
- Contributed to the establishment of the Higher Institute of Musical Art (Kuwait) for a period of 13 years.

== The scientific literature ==
- The Solfege, Kuwait, in 1977.
- Mohammed Abdel Wahab, Cairo, 1991.
- Soft music encyclopedia for children (part 50), Egypt - Lebanon, in 1992.
- Mohamed El Qasabgi.
- Supervision of the music in the second program of the Egyptian radio in 1957 until 1960.
- The preparation and submission of the global music TV program since 1960.
- Preparation of a series of music education for children consist of 30 programs by name of the lost tune.
- Preparation and *presented a music program in Egyptian television for 22 years.
- Participation in the tournament Operas roles in Egypt and in some capitals of Europe and America.
- Preparation of lyrical images of flags, especially music and singing of (Mohamed El Qasabgi- Sayed Darwish- Sayed Mekawy ), within the Arab Music Festival.

== Awards and honors ==
Egypt State Incentive Prize in Arts and Letters of the Supreme Council of Culture, in 2004. On 2 December 2017, Google showed a Doodle in few countries for El-Hefny’s 86th Birthday.

== Tribute ==
On 2 December 2017, Google dedicated a Doodle to the singer for the 86th anniversary of her birth. The Doodle reached all the countries of the Arab World.
