= Mohamed Abdou (political scientist) =

Egyptian-Canadian political scientist

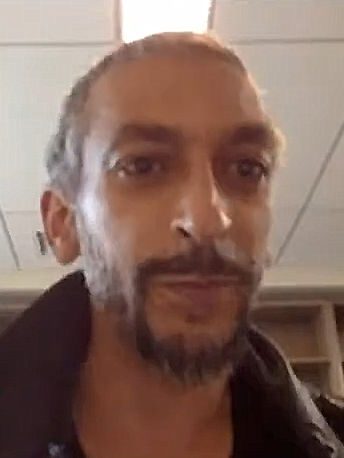
Abdou in 2024

Mohamed Abdou, also known as Mohamed Jean Veneuse, is a Canadian-Egyptian academic, author, and activist whose research focuses on decolonial theory, Islamic studies, anarchism, and indigenous resistance. He has held teaching positions in Queens University and the Ontario Institute of Studies in Education in Canada, American University of Cairo in Egypt, and Cornell University and Columbia University in the United States. He engages around the issues of Palestine, settler colonialism, and academic freedom.

== Early life and education ==
Abdou was born in Egypt and raised in Canada. He earned a B.A. and M.A in Sociology and a Ph.D. in Political Science and Islamic Studies from Queen’s University in Canada.

== Academic career ==
Abdou has held faculty and lecturer positions at various institutions in the US, Canada, and Egypt, namely the University of Toronto, Queen’s University, and Columbia University. His biography describes him as a North African-Egyptian Muslim anarchist interdisciplinary activist-scholar of Indigenous, Black, critical race and Islamic studies, as well as gender, sexuality, abolition and decolonization. According to his biography, his work explores the relationships between Islam and anarchism, and centers on indigenous, black and Palestinian liberation.

In 2020 he was a lecturer on Indigenous Land Education and Black Geographies at the Ontario Institute for Studies in Education-OISE University of Toronto. Between 2021–2023 he completed his post-doctoral fellowship on Global Racial Justice at Cornell University, and was then an International Affiliate Scholar. In parallel, in 2022 he joined the faculty of the Department of Sociology, Anthropology, & Egyptology at the American University of Cairo.

In 2022, Abdou published Islam and Anarchism: Relationships and Resonances with Pluto Press, arguing for a spiritually rooted, anti-authoritarian, decolonial interpretation of Islam.

In 2024, he was the Arcapita Visiting Assistant Professor at Columbia University’s Middle Eastern, South Asian & African Studies Program (MESAAS) in the Middle East Institute. His position became a subject of controversy after controversial claims he made on social media.

== Activism and controversies ==
Abdou describes himself as an anarchist. He is known for his activism in support of Palestinian rights and global decolonial movements. He has delivered lectures on indigenous resistance, settler colonialism, and transnational solidarity movements.

He has published essays and op-eds in media outlets including Al Jazeera and Middle East Eye, and maintains a Substack newsletter titled Endtimes.

Abdou has drawn criticism from some conservative and pro-Israel media outlets, which have accused him of supporting extremist groups. Supporters argue that such portrayals are politically motivated and undermine academic freedom.

In April 2024, Abdou and several other Columbia faculty members came under scrutiny during a hearing of the House Committee on Education and the Workforce, following their pro-Palestinian stances and comments. During that time, Abdou was a visiting scholar at Columbia for the Spring 2024 semester and taught the course Decolonial-Queerness and Abolition. His hiring by Columbia was criticized by committee member Elise Stefanik, after his social media post on October 11, 2023 stating "I'm with Hamas, Hezbollah and Islamic Jihad", shortly after the Hamas October 7 attack on Israel. Columbia President Nemat Shafik criticized Abdou's statement and said that Abdou "will never work at Columbia again". Shafik's comment sparked criticism from student and professor organizations, including the AAUP.

Abdou is currently promoting a campus tour called "Death to the Akademy". He has told students, "Be proud of your hate for America…You love Islam, and you should be loving Islam more than this barbarous colony. It’s a plague upon the earth. And yeah, in that sense, you need to be a threat. We all need to be a threat."

== Selected works ==
Books and Longform Works

- Abdou, Mohamed. Islam and Anarchism: Relationships and Resonances. Pluto Press, 2022. ISBN 9780745341927.
- Abdou, Mohamed. Anarca-Islam: Paths to Becoming a Muslim Anarchist. Miasma Publishing, 2007.
- Abdou, Mohamed & Kuhn, Gabriel (eds.). Varieties of Islamic Anarchism: A Brief Introduction. Zine, 2013.
- Abdou, Mohamed Jean Veneuse. Islam & Queer Muslims: Identity & Sexuality in the Contemporary World. Ph.D. Dissertation, Queen’s University, 2019.

Peer-Reviewed Journal Articles

- Abdou, Mohamed. “On the Ethics of Disagreements (Uṣūl al-Ikhtilāf) and the Ethics of Hospitality (Uṣūl al-Dhiyāfa)...” *Journal of Political Theology*, January 2022.
- Abdou, Mohamed. “Local, Regional, and Transnational Queer-Feminist Arab, Muslim, and People of Color Insurgent-Abolitionist Horizons.” *Al-Raida Journal*, 45(1), August 2021.
- Abdou, Mohamed. “The Body of the Condemned, Sally… Paths to Queering Anarca-Islam.” *Anarchist Developments in Cultural Studies*, 1 (2010): 217–239.

== See also ==
- Islam and anarchism
- Decoloniality
