= Gamal Refai-Ahmed =

Egyptian-Canadian-American engineer (born 1963)

Gamal Refai-Ahmed is an Egyptian-American engineer and technical executive known for his substantial contributions to thermal management, silicon architecture, and advanced packaging technologies. His work had a significant impact on high-performance computing (HPC), artificial intelligence (AI), and microelectromechanical systems (MEMS).

== Early life ==
Gamal Refai-Ahmed was born in Alexandria, Egypt. In 1985, he earned a bachelor's degree in mechanical engineering from Alexandria University. He obtained masters degree in 1990 and Ph.D. in mechanical engineering in 1994 from the University of Waterloo. His doctoral research focused on the thermal management of electronics packaging.

== Career ==
Gamal Refai-Ahmed's career spans over three decades, during which he has held senior technical positions at several leading technology companies, including AMD, GE, Cisco, and Nortel.

At Nortel he served as a senior member of the scientific staff, focusing on thermal tools and modeling for power supplies. (1996–1999).

At Cisco Systems Canada Ahmed was a thermal technical leader, developing thermal architectures for new routers and optical shelves (2000–2001).

At Advanced Micro Devices he was made a fellow, defined technology directions for the Platform Products Group and developed thermal management architectures for graphics, multimedia, mobile, and digital TV applications.

At PreQual Technologies Corp he served as chief scientist and founder, defining technology directions for platform development and spearheading innovations in LED printing and green energy systems.

At GE Global Research Center Ahmed was a senior technology architect and led the development of thermal management technology for GE's Intelligent Platform Controlling Systems and Healthcare Mobile Systems.

At AMD and Xilinx Ahmed serves as a senior fellow and chief architect at AMD. He played a pivotal role in developing advanced silicon power thermo-mechanical architectures, enhancing thermal management and packaging technologies for Xilinx products across telecom, data centers, and automotive sectors.

== Recognition ==
Refai Ahmed has received frequent recognition throughout his career:

- Fellow of ASME (2004)
- Calvin W. Rice Lecture from the American Society of Mechanical Engineers (ASME) (2010).
- Fellow of the Canadian Academy of Engineering (CAE) (2010)
- IEEE Canada R.H. Tanner Industrial Leadership Silver Medal Award (2014)
- Innovation Leader of the Year by the Integrated Electronics Engineering Center (IEEC) at Binghamton State University (2017)
- Presidential Medal from Binghamton University of New York for Innovation Leadership and Academic Contributions (2019)
- Fellow of the Engineering Institute of Canada (EIC) (2020)
- IEEE Fellow (2020)
- Member of the National Academy of Engineering (NAE) (2024)
- Alumni Achievement Medal for Professional Achievement from Faculty of Engineering, University of Waterloo (2024)

== Publications and patents ==
Dr. Refai Ahmed has published extensively on topics related to thermal management, packaging technology, and high-performance computing. His recent publications have appeared in IEEE, ASME, and other leading journals. He holds over 160 patents in semiconductor packaging, thermal management solutions, and electronic cooling technologies.

== Professional affiliations ==
Dr. Refai Ahmed is actively involved in professional societies and committees. He has served on:

- IEEE Fellow Committee
- High-Density Packaging (HIR) Technical Working Group
- Advisory Board of the NSF E2S Center.

He has served as an associate editor for several journals, including Journal of Thermal Science and Engineering Applications and Journal of Electronics Packaging.
