= Alexandria University =

Public university in Egypt

Coordinates: 31°12′07″N 29°54′19″E

- جامعة الإسكندرية
- Former names: Farouk I University (1938–1952)
- Type: Public
- Established: 1938; 88 years ago
- Founder: Farouk I
- President: Abdelaziz Konsowa
- Administrative staff: 7,402
- Students: 182,129
- Undergraduates: 143,553
- Postgraduates: 8,752
- Location: Alexandria, Egypt
- Campus: Urban
- Number Of Faculties: 23
- Website: alexu.edu.eg

Alexandria University (Arabic: جامعة الإسكندرية) is a public university in Alexandria, Egypt. It was established in 1938 as a satellite of Fouad University (the name of which was later changed to Cairo University), becoming an independent entity in 1942. It was known as Farouk University (named after Farouk of Egypt) until after the Egyptian Revolution of 1952, when its name was changed to the University of Alexandria. Taha Hussein was the founding rector of Alexandria University. It is now the second largest university in Egypt and has many affiliations to various universities for ongoing research.

Alexandria University is one of the largest universities in Egypt, and the third university established after Cairo University and the American University in Cairo. Alexandria University has 21 faculties and 3 institutes that teach different types of social, medical, engineering, mathematics and other science. The university had other branches in Egypt outside Alexandria in Damanhour and Matrouh which later became two independent universities. and Alexandria National University in Smouha area. Other branches have been set up outside Egypt in Juba, South Sudan, and in N'Djamena, the capital of the Republic of Chad.

== History ==
The idea to establish a branch of Fouad I University in Alexandria was approved by the university's council on 4 August 1938, with the decision ratified by the Council of Ministers two days later.

The "Zarfoudaki Palace" was leased as the branch's initial location, and studies began on 15 October 1938, with the Faculty of Arts and the Faculty of Law. The Faculty of Engineering was established in 1941. On 2 August 1942, Royal Decree No. 32 officially established King Farouk I University in Alexandria, which included the faculties of Arts, Law, Medicine, Science, Engineering, Agriculture, and Commerce. At the time of its establishment, the university had 1,171 students and 134 faculty members.

The new Faculty of Law was initially housed in a secondary school building. In 1942, the Faculty of Agriculture was established in Damanhour. Following the 1952 revolution, the university's name was officially changed to Alexandria University.

The university continued to expand, adding several new faculties and institutes over the following decades, including the Faculty of Fine Arts in 1957 and the Faculty of Veterinary Medicine in 1975. In the 1980s and 1990s, the university added branches and integrated several faculties from Helwan University. In the 21st century, the university began to expand internationally, establishing branches in N'Djamena, Chad (2010), and Juba, South Sudan (2014).

== Administration ==
- Dr. Abdelaziz Konsowa, president of Alexandria University
- Dr. Hesham Saeed, vice president for graduate studies and research
- Dr. Ahmed Adel Abdelhakim, vice president for education and student affairs
- Dr. Affaf Al-Oufy, vice president for community service and environmental development

== Faculties ==
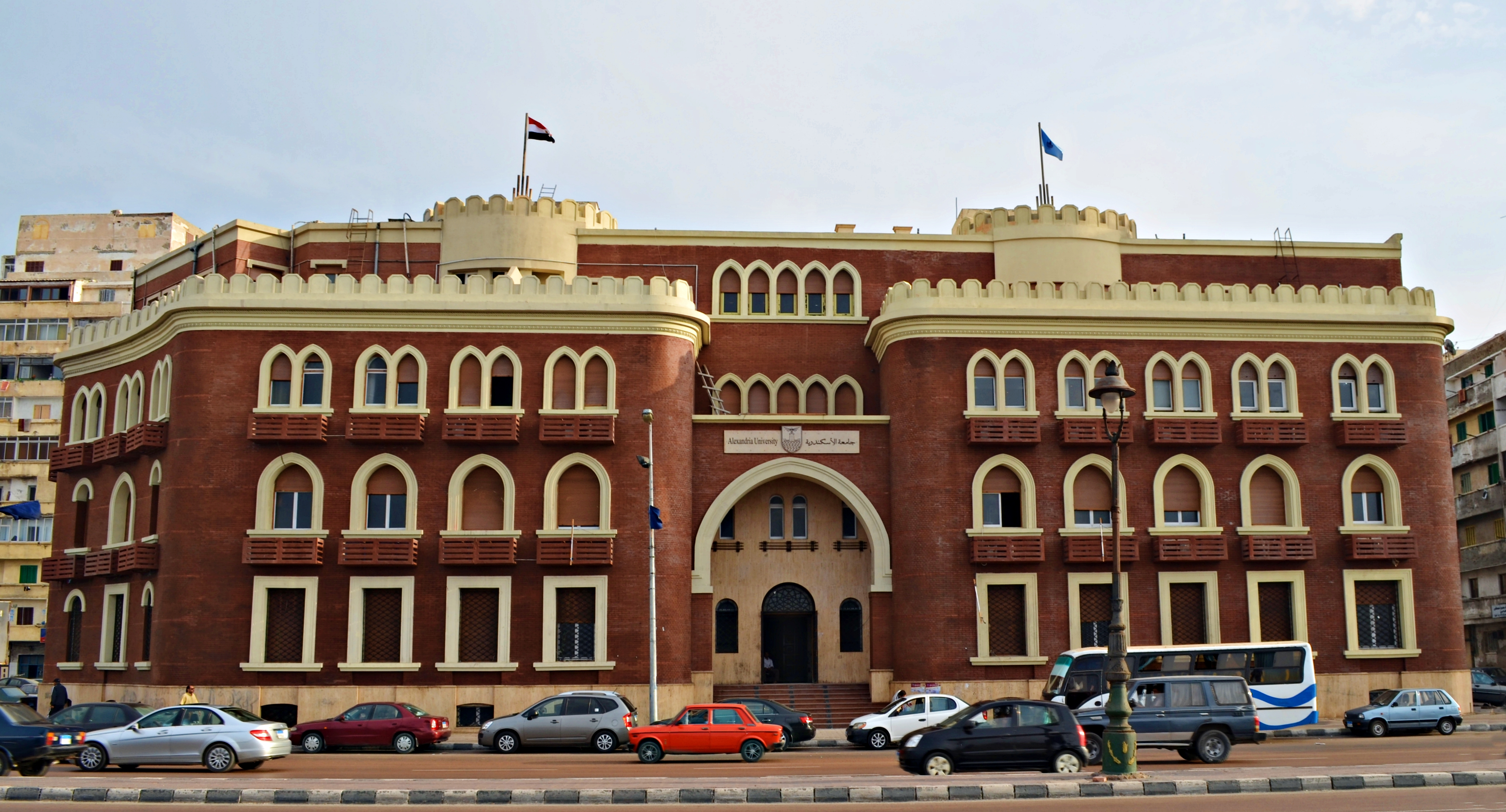
Main campus in Alexandria.

At the time it became an independent institution in 1942, it had the following faculties:

- Faculty of Agriculture
- Faculty of Medicine (1942)
- Faculty of Arts (1938)
- Faculty of Business (Formally Commerce)
- Faculty of Engineering (1941)
- Faculty of Law (1938)
- Faculty of Science (1942)

In 1989, four faculties, located in Alexandria and administered by Helwan University, were annexed to Alexandria University. These are the faculties of agriculture, fine arts, physical education for boys and physical education for girls.

Alexandria University now holds 24 faculties and institutes as follows:

- Faculty of Arts (1938)
- Faculty of Law (1938)
- Faculty of Business (1942)
- Faculty of Engineering (1942)
- Faculty of Science (1942)
- Faculty of Agriculture (1942)
- Faculty of Medicine (1942)
- Faculty of Pharmacy (1947)
- Faculty of Nursing (1954)
- Faculty of Physical Education for Girls (1954)
- Faculty of Physical Education for Boys (1955)
- High Institute of Public Health (1956)
- Faculty of Fine Arts (1957)
- Faculty of Agriculture (Saba Basha) (1959)
- Faculty of Education (1966)
- Faculty of Dentistry (1970)
- Institute of Graduate Studies and Research (1972)
- Faculty of Veterinary Medicine (1975)
- Institute of Medical Research (1975)
- Faculty of Tourism and Hotels (1982)
- Faculty of Specific Education (1988)
- Faculty of Education for Early Childhood (1989)
- Faculty of Economic Studies & Political Science (2014)
- Faculty of Computing and Data Science (2019)

== Branches ==
Alexandria University also opened branches inside Egypt and African and Middle Eastern countries:

- Chad branch (2010)
- South Sudan branch (2014)
- Alexandria National University (2021)
- New Borg El Arab branch
- Iraq branch

== Hospitals ==
- Al Hadra University Hospital.
- Borg El Arab University Hospital.

== Ranking ==
University rankings

Global – Overall
- ARWU World: 601–700 (2023)
- QS World: 781-790 (2026)
- THE World: 801–1000 (2024)
- USNWR Global: =611 (2023)

Alexandria University was ranked 147th worldwide based on Times Higher Education's World University Rankings 2010–2011. The 2010 rankings were controversial, as a single professor's practice of publishing a great number of articles in a journal of which he himself was the editor was identified as a crucial contributing factor for the high rating of Alexandria University. Alexandria University is ranked 1001+ worldwide based on Times Higher Education's World University Rankings 2020. Alexandria University is ranked 801-1000+ worldwide based on QS World University Rankings 2021. It is ranked 701-800 worldwide and 2nd in Egypt based on Shanghai ranking 2020.

== Notable alumni and faculty ==
- Fawzia Al-Ashmawi (College of Arts, 1965) – Egyptian academic at University of Geneva
- Soheir Bakhoum (1974) - Egyptian-French numismatist
- Azer Bestavros (Faculty of Engineering, 1984) – Warren Distinguished Professor of Computer Science, Boston University, Boston, US
- Mervat Seif el-Din – classical archaeologist and egyptologist, former director of the Graeco-Roman Museum
- Mostafa El-Abbadi – professor and historian
- Mohamed Hashish (Faculty of Engineering) – research scientist best known as the father of the abrasive water jet cutter
- Mohammed Aboul-Fotouh Hassab (1913–2000) – professor of gastro-intestinal surgery; creator of surgical procedure known as Hassab's decongestion operation
- Mo Ibrahim (Faculty of Engineering) – Sudanese-British mobile communications entrepreneur and billionaire
- Samira Islam – Saudi Arabian pharmacologist and educator
- Yahya El Mashad (Faculty of Engineering, 1952) – Egyptian nuclear physicist
- Rebecca Joshua Okwaci (English language, literature, and translation) – South Sudanese politician, and the Minister of Telecommunications and Postal Services in the Government of the Republic of South Sudan
- Gamal Refai-Ahmed (Faculty of Engineering, 1985) Egyptian thermal Engineer, University of Waterloo Distinguished Alumni, Member of US National Academy of Engineering, Fellow of Canadian Academy of Engineering, Fellow IEEE, Life Fellow ASME. best known for his groundbreaking contributions to thermal management in electronics packaging and his extensive work in silicon and power architecture as well as advanced packaging technologies.
- Tawfiq Saleh (English literature, 1949) – film director
- Boshra Salem – professor, founder and the Chair of the Department of Environmental Sciences
- Bahgat G. Sammakia (Faculty of Engineering, 1977) – Director of CHIRP at Binghamton University; Distinguished Professor; Vice President for Research; Dir of CHIRP at Binghamton Univ; Center Director of ES2; Director, S3IP; Center Director of ES2; Vice President for Research; Director, S3IP Binghamton University, best known for his pioneering contributions to thermal and mechanical management in electronics packaging and his leadership in the field of electronics systems integration and reliability.
- Zubaida Tharwat, Egyptian actress
- William Linn Westermann (Visiting Professor 1948) – American papyrologist
- Magdy Younes – Canadian physician, medical researcher and academic
- Moustafa Youssef (Faculty of Engineering, 1997) – Egyptian computer scientist and engineer. First and only ACM fellow in the Middle East and Africa.
- Ahmed Zewail (Faculty of Science, 1967) – Nobel Prize in chemistry, 1999

== See also ==
- List of Islamic educational institutions
- Borg El Arab University Hospital
- Educational institutions in Alexandria
- Education in Egypt
- List of universities in Egypt
