= List of ship launches in 1855 =

The list of ship launches in 1855 includes a chronological list of some ships launched in 1855.

Date	Ship	Class	Builder	Location	Country	Notes
3 January	McKay	Clipper	Donald McKay	East Boston, Massachusetts	United States	For Black Ball Line.
3 January	War Hawk	Medium clipper	George W. Jackman	Newburyport, Massachusetts	United States	For Bush & Comstock and others.
4 January	Mary Russell Mitford	Barque	Messrs. T. Metcalfe & Sons	South Shields	United Kingdom	For Messrs. T. Metcalfe & Sons.
4 January	Southern Cross	Missionary ship	Messrs. Wigram's	Poplar	United Kingdom	For George Selwyn.
10 January	Naparina	West Indiaman	Messrs. Charles Hill & Sons	Bristol	United Kingdom	For Messrs. Scrutton, Son, & Co.
15 January	Ellwood Walter	Schooner	Thomas Stack	Williamsburg, New York	United States	For John B. Sandy.
16 January	Victoria and Albert	Royal yacht		Pembroke Dockyard	United Kingdom	For Queen Victoria.
17 January	Dodo	Steamship	Cork Steamship Company	Cork	United Kingdom	For private owner.
18 January	Agamemnon	Full-rigged ship	Richard Wilkinson	Pallion	United Kingdom	For Potts Bros.
18 January	Bosworth	Full-rigged ship	James & R. Mills	Southwick	United Kingdom	For Messrs. Wood, Spence & Blair.
18 January	Sir James	Full-rigged ship	John Smith	Pallion	United Kingdom	For Tyler & Co.
18 January	Snaresbrook	Barque	Messrs. Sykes & Garbutt	Hylton	United Kingdom	For John Briggs.
18 January	Wearmouth	Collier	James Laing	Sunderland	United Kingdom	For Bell & Co.
19 January	Fiery Cross	Steamship	Messrs. Napier	Govan	United Kingdom	For Matheson & Co.
20 January	City of Baltimore	Steamship	Messrs. Tod & McGregor	Glasgow	United Kingdom	For Peninsular and Oriental Steam Navigation Company.
27 January	Arago	Paddle steamer	Jacob Aaron Westervelt	New York City	United States	For New York and Havre Steam Navigation Company.
29 January	Dauntless	Brig	Messrs. Dewdney	Brixham	United Kingdom	For private owner.
January	Alma	Barque	James Hardie	Sunderland	United Kingdom	For Messrs. Haddock & Co.
January	Bosworth	Full-rigged ship	Messrs. Mills Brothers	Southwick	United Kingdom	For Messrs Woods, Spence and Blair.
January	Chance	Barque		Quebec City	(United Kingdom of Great Britain and Ireland) Province of Canada	For private owner.
January	Donald McKay	Extreme clipper	Donald McKay	East Boston, Massachusetts	United States	For Black Ball Line.
January	Great Republic	Extreme clipper	Donald McKay	East Boston, Massachusetts	United States	Relaunched, having caught fire December 27, 1853, shortly after first launch.
January	Henrietta Brewis	Barque	W. Petrie	Sunderland	United Kingdom	For Robert Brewis.
January	Napoleon III	Clipper		River Clyde	United Kingdom	For private owner.
January	Propeller	Steamship	T. D. Marshall	South Shields	United Kingdom	For private owner.
January	Wyre	Schooner		Fleetwood	United Kingdom	For private owner.
2 February	Young Mechanic	Clipper	T. W. Rhoades	Rockland, Maine	United States	For William McLoon.
3 February	Jackal	Steamship	Messrs. C. Mitchell & Co.	Newcastle upon Tyne	United Kingdom	For private owner.
3 February	Sabine	Brandywine-class frigate		New York Navy Yard	United States	For United States Navy.
5 February	Rodeur	Aviso		Cherbourg	France	For French Navy.
15 February	Avoca	Barque	Albert White	Waterford	United Kingdom	For private owner.
15 February	Kensington	Barque	Cunningham	Newcastle upon Tyne	United Kingdom	For private owner.
16 February	Santee	Frigate		Portsmouth Navy Yard	United States	For United States Navy
17 February	Bretagne	Ship of the Line		Brest Arsenal	France	For French Navy.
17 February	Maid of Glan Ogwen	Merchantman	Parry	Hirael	United Kingdom	For private owner.
17 February	Precursor	Clipper	Scott	Inverkeithing	United Kingdom	For private owner.
17 February	Resolute	Troopship	John Laird	Liverpool	United Kingdom	For Royal Navy.
20 February	William Leckie	Barque	George Worthy	Pallion	United Kingdom	For John Nicholson, William Nicholson & William Nicholson Jr.
23 February	Niagara	Steam frigate		New York Navy Yard	United States	For United States Navy.
27 February	Victor Emmanuel	Agamemnon-class ship of the line		Pembroke Dockyard	United Kingdom	For Royal Navy.
February	Dipomata	Schooner		Caminha	Portugal	For private owner.
February	White Eagle	Steamship	R. Barclay & Curle	Stobcross	United Kingdom	For private owner.
February	White Eagle	Clipper	Messrs. Alexander Stephen & Sons	Kelvinside	United Kingdom	For private owner.
4 March	Startled Fawn	Merchantman	Bank Quay Foundry Company	Warrington	United Kingdom	For private owner.
5 March	Heather Bell	Clipper	Messrs. A. Duthie & Co.	Aberdeen	United Kingdom	For private owner.
6 March	Saint Clair	Barque	Watt	Dysart	United Kingdom	For Fraser, Murdoch & Boyd.
7 March	Euxine	Brig	Messrs. Turnbull & Craggs	Stockton-on-Tees	United Kingdom	For Mr. Hutton.
7 March	Grinder	Dapper-class gunboat	J. & R. White	West Cowes	United Kingdom	For Royal Navy.
16 March	Herald of Fame	Barque	Messrs. Richard Williamson & Sons	Harrington	United Kingdom	For private owner.
17 March	Caledonia	Steamship	Messrs. William Denny & Bros.	Dumbarton	United Kingdom	For Messrs. Miller & Sons.
17 March	Tonnante	Dévastation-class ironclad floating battery		Brest	France	For French Navy.
18 March	Étincelle	Étincelle-class gunboat		Cherbourg	France	For French Navy.
19 March	Lady Lindsay	Steamship	Messrs. Watson & Allsup	Preston	United Kingdom	For Messrs. Pearce, Rawcliffe & Co.
19 March	Nicholas Harvey	Schooner	Messrs. Harvey & Co.	Hayle	United Kingdom	For private owner.
19 March	Volta	Corvette		Lorient	France	For French Navy.
19 March	West Derby	Full-rigged ship	Messrs. P. Chaloner, Sons, & Co.	Liverpool	United Kingdom	For Messrs. Brown & Co.
20 March	Arcole	Algésiras-class ship of the line	Toulon Naval Yard	Toulon	France	For French Navy. Also reported as built at Cherbourg.
20 March	Conquest	Barque	Messrs. Cato, Miller & Co.	Liverpool	United Kingdom	For private owner.
20 March	Elizabeth Anne	Brig	David Griffiths	Cardigan	United Kingdom	For private owner.
20 March	Heroes of Alma	Barque	Messrs. John & Robert White	Cowes	United Kingdom	For James Shepherd.
20 March	Lord Cardigan	Steamship	Messrs. Samuelson & Co.	Hull	United Kingdom	For Messrs. Gee & Co.
22 March	Lord Worsley	Paddle Steamer	Messrs. Samuelson & Co.	Hull	United Kingdom	For Manchester, Sheffield and Lincolnshire Railway.
27 March	Edwin Forrest	Schooner	Jacob A. Westervelt, Sons, & Co.	New HYork	United States	For New York Pilots.
31 March	Norah	Steamship	Neptune Iron Works	Waterford	United Kingdom	For Waterford Steamship Company.
31 March	Surly	Bomb vessel	Money, Wigram & Son	Blackwall Yard	United Kingdom	For Royal Navy.
March	Belle Hoxie	Clipper	Irons & Grinell	Mystic, Connecticut	United States	For private owner.
March	Camoens	Paddle steamer		River Tyne	United Kingdom	For Tagus Steam Navigation Company.
March	Flamme	Étincelle-class gunboat			France	For French Navy.
March	Lady Lindsay	Steamship	Watson & Allsop	Liverpool	United Kingdom	For Rawcliffe, Pease, Whitehead and Moore & Sons.
March	Northumbrian	Full-rigged ship	Michael Byers	Sunderland	United Kingdom	For Scott & Co.
March	Oneida	Steamship	Messrs. John Scott & Sons	Greenock	United Kingdom	For Canada Ocean Steamship Company.
March	Rosedal	Steamship		Jarrow	United Kingdom	For private owner.
March	Transit	Troopship	Messrs. Mare & Co.	Blackwall	United Kingdom	For Royal Navy.
2 April	Urgent	Troopship	C. J. Mare	Blackwall	United Kingdom	For Royal Navy.
3 April	Providence	Brig	Messrs. Leighton & Co.	Blyth	United Kingdom	For private owner.
3 April	Spitfire	Gunboat	Cuthberts Shipyard	Port Jackson	(United Kingdom of Great Britain and Ireland) New South Wales	For Colony of New South Wales.
3 April	Tempête	Poudre-class gunboat			France	For French Navy.
3 April	Tocsin	Bombe-class mortar vessel		Lorient	France	For French Navy.
3 April	Tourmente	Poudre-class gunboat			France	For French Navy.
3 April	Not named	Steamship	John Laird	Birkenhead	United Kingdom	For private owner.
4 April	Sebastian	Barque	John Smith	Pallion	United Kingdom	For Joyce & Co.
4 April	Schomberg	Clipper	Alexander Hall & Co.	Aberdeen	United Kingdom	For Black Ball Line.
5 April	Assistance	Steamship	John Laird	Liverpool	United Kingdom	For British Government.
5 April	Enchantress	Barque	Pickersgill & Miller	Sunderland	United Kingdom	For J. A. Marks.
5 April	Madagascar	Steamship	Scott & Co.	Greenock	United Kingdom	For J. Rennie & Co.
5 April	Schomberg	Clipper	Messrs. Alexander Hall & Co.	Aberdeen	United Kingdom	For Black Ball Line.
8 April	Carbon	Steamship		Liverpool	United Kingdom	For private owner.
12 April	Armenian	Steamship	Messrs. Smith & Rodgers	Govan	United Kingdom	For Messrs. Lewis Potter & Co.
16 April	Marne	Transport ship		Brest	France	For French Navy.
17 April	Caribbean	Full-rigged ship	Haswell	Newcastle upon Tyne	United Kingdom	For John Hay.
17 April	Dévastation	Dévastation-class ironclad floating battery		Cherbourg	France	For French Navy.
17 April	Meteor	Aetna-class ironclad floating battery	Messrs. Mare & Co.	Blackwall	United Kingdom	For Royal Navy.
17 April	Miss Evans	Schooner		Derwenlas	United Kingdom	For R. Evans.
17 April	Sutlej	Constance-class frigate		Pembroke Dockyard	United Kingdom	For Royal Navy.
17 April	Thunder	Aetna-class ironclad floating battery	Messrs. C. J. Mars & Sons	Blackwall	United Kingdom	For Royal Navy.
18 April	Aln	Barque	Bowman and Drummond	Blyth	United Kingdom	For G. Bowman & T. Drummond.
18 April	Eclair	Gunboat		Cherbourg	France	For French Navy.
18 April	Glatton	Aetna-class ironclad floating battery	Messrs. R. & H. Green	Blackwall	United Kingdom	For Royal Navy.
18 April	Penelope	Schooner	Mr. Thomas	Conway	United Kingdom	For Cropper & Bell.
18 April	Trusty	Aetna-class ironclad floating battery	Messrs. R. & H. Green	Blackwall	United Kingdom	For Royal Navy.
19 April	Bombe	Bombe-class mortar vessel		Lorient	France	For French Navy.
19 April	Elba	Steamship	Messrs. Palmer Bros.	Jarrow	United Kingdom	For Messrs. R. S. Newall & Co.
19 April	George Kydd	Merchantman		Alloa	United Kingdom	For Bailie Kydd.
19 April	Harvest Home	Clipper	Messrs. Thomas Vernon & Sons	Liverpool	United Kingdom	For Messrs. Henry Moore & Co.
19 April	Nightingale	Brig	Messrs. George Milne & Co.	Aberdeen	United Kingdom	For private owner.
24 April	Fournaise	Bombe-class mortar vessel		Lorient	France	For French Navy.
25 April	Thatcher Magoun	Extreme clipper	Hayden & Cudworth	Medford, Massachusetts	United States	For Thatcher Magoun.
26 April	Wynyard	Snow	Edward Potts	Seaham	United Kingdom	For M. Moore.
30 April	Poudre	Poudre-class gunboat		Nantes	France	For French Navy.
30 April	Sainte Barbe	Poudre-class gunboat		Nantes	France	For French Navy.
April	Empress Eugenie	Steamship	Messrs. Rennie, Johnson & Rankin	Liverpool	United Kingdom	For North and West of France Steam Navigation Company.
April	European	Steamship	Messrs. Scott & Co.	Greenock	United Kingdom	For private owner.
April	Fusileer	Merchantman	Messrs. Rennie, Johnson & Rankin	Liverpool	United Kingdom	For Messrs. Colesworth, Wynne & Lyne.
April	Glenalmond	Barque			(United Kingdom of Great Britain and Ireland) Colony of Nova Scotia	For private owner.
April	Jourdain	Steamship	John Laird	Birkenhead	United Kingdom	For Compagnie des Messageries Imperiales.
April	Powerful	Steamship	T. D. Marshall	South Shields	United Kingdom	For North of Europe Steam Navigation Company.
April	Retreiver	Steamship	Tayleur & Co	Warrington	United Kingdom	For private owner.
April	Urina	Steamship	T. D. Marshall	South Shields	United Kingdom	For private owner.
1 May	Lance	Poudre-class gunboat		Nantes	France	For French Navy.
1 May	Redoute	Poudre-class gunboat		Nantes	France	For French Navy.
1 May	Torche	Bombe-class mortar vessel		Lorient	France	For French Navy.
2 May	Conqueror	Conqueror-class ship of the line		Devonport Dockyard	United Kingdom	For Royal Navy.
2 May	John O'Gaunt	Clipper		Whitehaven	United Kingdom	For private owner.
3 May	Alarme	Gunboat		Toulon	France	For French Navy.
3 May	Ava	Passenger ship	Tod & McGregor	Glasgow	United Kingdom	For Peninsular and Oriental Steam Navigation Company.
3 May	Coringa	Full-rigged ship	Arrow Leithead	Sunderland	United Kingdom	For John Hay.
3 May	Ernestine	Steamship	Messrs. Samuelson & Co.	Hull	United Kingdom	For private owner.
3 May	Etna	Aetna-class ironclad floating battery	Messrs. John Scott Russell & Co.	Millwall	United Kingdom	For Royal Navy. Caught fire and self-launched, damaged beyond repair.
3 May	Meurthe	Transport ship		Lorient	France	For French Navy.
3 May	Sarah Ellen	Brigantine	Messrs. Ferguson, McCallum, & Baird	Flint	United Kingdom	For private owner.
4 May	The Banffshire	Schooner	John Watson	Banff	United Kingdom	For private owner.
5 May	Fontabelle	West Indiaman	Messrs. C. Hill & Sons	Bristol	United Kingdom	For Charles Dawson.
5 May	Labuan	Steamship	Messrs. W. C. Miller & Son	Toxteth	United Kingdom	For Eastern Archipelago Company.
5 May	Trombe	Bombe-class mortar vessel		Lorient	France	For French Navy.
9 May	Flèche	Alarme-class gunboat	Toulon Naval Yard	Toulon	France	For French Navy.
9 May	The Mermaid	Yacht		Holyhead	United Kingdom	For Thomas Hirste.
10 May	Alerte	Alerte-class gunboat		Toulon	France	For French Navy.
12 May	Bourrasque	Alerte-class gunboat		Toulon	France	For French Navy.
12 May	Dragonne	Gunboat	M. Normand	Le Havre	France	For French Navy.
14 May	Aigrette	Alarme-class gunboat	M. Normand	Le Havre	France	For French Navy.
15 May	Jane and Anne	Schooner	John Roberts	Holyhead	United Kingdom	For W. Hurlbutt.
16 May	Couleuvrine	Alerte-class gunboat		Toulon	France	For French Navy.
16 May	Fusée	Gunboat		Toulon	France	For French Navy.
17 May	Cecile	Schooner	Messrs. White	East Cowes	United Kingdom	For Marquess of Conynghm.
17 May	Great Conquest	Tug	Toward	Newcastle upon Tyne	United Kingdom	For private owner.
17 May	Kelso	Full-rigged ship	W. Pile	Sunderland	United Kingdom	For John R. Kelso.
17 May	Marquez d'Olinda	Steamship	John Laird	Liverpool	United Kingdom	For R. Rawsthorne.
17 May	Viscount Canning	Full-rigged ship	James Robinson, or J. & J. Robinson	Sunderland	United Kingdom	For J. Prowse.
19 May	Rattler	Tug	Messrs. J. W. Hoby & Co.	Renfrew	United Kingdom	For Liverpool Tug Company.
20 May	Fulminante	Alarme-class gunboat	M. Normand	Le Havre	France	For French Navy.
22 May	Sarah Newmann	Clipper	George Cox	Bideford	United Kingdom	For John Leech.
24 May	Earl of Erne	Steamship	Messrs. Napier	Govan	United Kingdom	For Liverpool and Dundalk Steam Packet Company.
26 May	Avalanche	Alarme-class gunboat		Le Havre	France	For French Navy.
26 May	Lave	Dévastation-class ironclad floating battery	Lorient Naval Yard	Lorient	France	For French Navy.
31 May	Alhambra	Steamship	Samuda Brothers	Cubitt Town	United Kingdom	For Peninsular and Oriental Steam Navigation Company.
31 May	Caroline Coventree	Full-rigged ship	W. Wilkinson	Deptford	United Kingdom	For Conventree Dundass.
31 May	Electra	Full-rigged ship	Gibson	Sunderland	United Kingdom	For Joseph Shield, Son, & Co.
31 May	Gem of the Nith	Barque	Lightfoot	Hylton Dene	United Kingdom	For John Morton.
31 May	Queen of the North	Full-rigged ship	James Briggs	Pallion	United Kingdom	For Messrs. Bradley & Potts.
31 May	Queen of the South	Barque	John Watson	Sunderland	United Kingdom	For John Morton, or Martin & Co.
May	Mitraille	Alarme-class gunboat		Le Mourillon	France	For French Navy.
1 June	Congrève	Dévastation-class ironclad floating battery			France	For French Navy.
2 June	Brunswick	Modified Vanguard-class ship of the line		Pembroke Dockyard	United Kingdom	For Royal Navy.
2 June	Manchester	Steamship	Messrs. Samuelson & Co.	Hull	United Kingdom	For Manchester, Sheffield and Lincolnshire Railway.
2 June	Strident	Gunboat		Toulon	France	For French Navy.
2 June	Vigo	Steamship	John Laird	Birkenhead	United Kingdom	For private owner.
4 June	Ant	Paddle steamer	Messrs. Blackwood & Gordon	Paisley	United Kingdom	For Messrs. Hetherington.
7 June	Flora	Steamship	Messrs. Robinson & Co.	Cork	United Kingdom	For Joseph Malcolmson.
9 June	Borland	Brig	John Anderton	Runcorn	United Kingdom	For private owner.
15 June	Florence Nightingale, or Nightingale	Brig	Webster	Fraserburgh	United Kingdom	For private owner.
15 June	Merrimack	Steam frigate		Charleston Navy Yard	United States	For United States Navy.
16 June	Clansman	Steamship	Messrs. James & George Thomson	Glasgow	United Kingdom	For Messrs. David Hutcheson & Co.
17 June	Fanny Nicholson	Barque	John Pile	Hartlepool	United Kingdom	For John McArthur & William Andrews.
18 June	Ellen Radford	Brig	Follett	Teignmouth	United Kingdom	For private owner.
26 June	Esmeralda	Corvette	William Pitcher	Northfleet	United Kingdom	For Chilean Navy.
30 June	Inkermann	Barque	Messrs. Harvey	Ipswich	United Kingdom	For private owner.
30 June	Newnham	Brig	Edward Jones	Pwllheli	United Kingdom	For Le Maistre & Co.
30 June	Queenstown	Clipper	Paisley	Passage West	United Kingdom	For Messrs. Scott & Co.
30 June	Thessalia	Steamship	Messrs. J. & G. Thomson	Govan	United Kingdom	For Messrs. Papayanni & Mussabini.
30 June	Victoria	Sloop of War	Messrs. Young, Magny & Co.	Limehouse	United Kingdom	For Colony of Victoria.
June	Catherine	Snow	W. Wilkinson	Sunderland	United Kingdom	For Mr. Ingram.
June	Foudroyante	Dévastation-class ironclad floating battery		Lorient	France	For French Navy.
2 July	Beemah	Merchantman	Messrs. Stephen & Sons	Dundee	United Kingdom	For Messrs. Willis and Company.
3 July	Persia	Paddle steamer	Robert Napier and Sons	Glasgow	United Kingdom	For Cunard Line.
3 July	Sea Star	Clipper	Messrs. Hall	Aberdeen	United Kingdom	For D. Louttit.
4 July	Dredger No. 6	Dredger	Messrs. Thomas Wingate & Co.	Whiteinch	United Kingdom	For Clyde Trust.
7 July	Araxes	Steamship	Messrs. Stothert & Fripp	Hotwells	United Kingdom	For private owner.
12 July	Finnart	Steam Yacht	Messrs. Tod & McGregor	Glasgow	United Kingdom	For Mr. McGregor.
14 July	Agamemnon	Merchantman	Richard Green	Blackwall	United Kingdom	For private owner.
16 July	Durant	Transport ship		Lorient	France	For French Navy.
16 July	Gambia	Steamship	Messrs. Lawrence, Hill & Co.	Port Glasgow	United Kingdom	For African Steam Ship Company.
16 July	Grace	Schooner	James Geddie	Garmouth	United Kingdom	For Messrs. Forrest & Florence.
16 July	La Hogue	Full-rigged ship	James Laing	Sunderland	United Kingdom	For Duncan Dunbar.
16 July	Robert Keddey	Schooner	Messrs. Humphrey & Son	Hull	United Kingdom	For Thomas Colgan.
17 July	Eugenie	Barque	Bowman and Drummond	Blyth	United Kingdom	For Dawson & Co.
21 July	Rob Roy	Steamship	Alexander Denny	Dumbarton	United Kingdom	For private owner.
29 July	Osprey	Steamship	Cork Steamship Company	Cork	United Kingdom	For private owner.
29 July	Primer Argentino	Paddle steamer	Messrs. Henry Balfour & Co.	Fife	United Kingdom	For Messrs. Joseph Green & Co.
30 July	Ann Adamson	Barque	William Adamson	Southwick	United Kingdom	For William Adamson.
30 July	Ann Elizabeth, or Ann & Elizabeth	Barque	George Barker	Monkwearmouth	United Kingdom	For Mr. Wright.
30 July	Constantia	Full-rigged ship	Michael Byers & Co.	Monkwearmouth	United Kingdom	For H. Parker.
30 July	Cosmos	Barque	Messrs. John Davidson & Co.	Sunderland	United Kingdom	For R. J. Brown.
30 July	Day Star	Snow	Messrs. Sykes, Talbot & Sykes	Sunderland	United Kingdom	For William Allen.
30 July	Duchess of Marlborough	Merchantman	Messrs. Ray & Sons	Portsmouth	United Kingdom	For private owner.
30 July	Indomitable	Steamship	Thomas Henderson	Pallion	United Kingdom	For R. J. Brown.
30 July	Isabella	Barque	Naizby	Hylton	United Kingdom	For G. Smith.
30 July	Penguin	Barque	Messrs. R. H. Potts & Bros	Sunderland	United Kingdom	For Messrs. R. H. Potts & Bros.
30 July	Progress	Barque	George Bartram & Sons	South Shields	United Kingdom	For George Lawson.
30 July	Not named	Barque	Messrs. Forrest & Jackson	Sunderland	United Kingdom	For Messrs. Forrest & Jackson.
31 July	Cormorin	Merchantman		Whitehaven	United Kingdom	For private owner.
31 July	Croiseur	Aviso		Cherbourg	France	For French Navy.
31 July	Fanny	Sloop	Mark Pearson	Goole	United Kingdom	For private owner.
31 July	Marlborough	First rate		Portsmouth Dockyard	United Kingdom	For Royal Navy.
31 July	Royal Charter	Steamship		Sandycroft	United Kingdom	For Australian Screw Steamship Company. Sank on being launched. Later refloated.
July	Alert	Steamship	Messrs. Earle	Hull	United Kingdom	For Messrs. Ringrose.
July	Bittern	Barque	Austin & Mills	Sunderland	United Kingdom	For William Snowball & John Murch.
July	Minorva	Barque	Messrs. Duthie & Cochar	Montrose	United Kingdom	For Messrs. Collie & Co.
July	Peri	Brigantine		Georgetown	(United Kingdom of Great Britain and Ireland) Colony of Prince Edward Island	For private owner.
1 August	Bee	Paddle steamer	Messrs. Blackwood & Gordon	Paisley	United Kingdom	For Messrs. Hetherington.
1 August	City of Washington	Steamship	Messrs. Tod & McGregor	Glasgow	United Kingdom	For Liverpool and Philadelphia Line.
1 August	Comorin, or Coromine	East Indiaman		Whitehaven	United Kingdom	For Messrs. Thomas Brocklebank & Co.
1 August	Fiery Cross	Clipper	Messrs. Rennie, Johnson & Rankin	Liverpool	United Kingdom	For Messrs. John & James Campbell.
1 August	Lizzy	Sloop	Messrs. Fletchers	Goole	United Kingdom	For private owner.
1 August	Prince Patrick	Paddle steamer	Messrs. Thomas Vernon & Sons	Liverpool	United Kingdom	For North Lancashire Steam Navigation Company.
1 August	Sarah Palmer	Full-rigged ship	Bank Quay Foundry	Warrington	United Kingdom	For Messrs. Jones, Palmer & Co.
2 August	Pauline	Brig	Westaway	Lowestoft	United Kingdom	For Mr. Andrews and others.
3 August	Vedra	Collier	James Laing	Sunderland	United Kingdom	For W. Stobart.
5 August	Sancho Panza	Medium clipper	Samuel Lapham	Medford, Massachusetts	United States	For John Ellerton Lodge.
14 August	Dialmath	Aviso		Brest	France	For French Navy.
14 August	Meteor	Barque	T. C. Lee	Hare Point	(United Kingdom of Great Britain and Ireland) Province of Canada	For Messrs. Funck, Meinke & Co.
14 August	Podor	Aviso		Brest	France	For French Navy.
15 August	Red Coat	Schooner	Messrs. J. & R. White	Cowes	United Kingdom	For private owner.
16 August	Alarm	Schooner	Messrs. Bayley & Sons	Ipswich	United Kingdom	For Edward & George Johnson.
16 August	Martlet	Steamship	Messrs. Brownlow & Lumsden	Hull	United Kingdom	For Messrs. Brownlow & Co.
17 August	Moss	Paddle steamer	Messrs. Caird & Co.	Greenock	United Kingdom	For Moss Steamboat Company.
17 August	Nordstjernon	Steamship	Messrs. Caird & Co.	Greenock	United Kingdom	For Bergen Steam Packet Company.
24 August	Frauenlob	Schooner	Lübke	Wolgast	Prussia	For Prussian Navy.
27 August	Isère	Transport ship		Toulon	France	For French Navy.
28 August	North Sea	Steamship	Messrs. Earle	Hull	United Kingdom	For Messrs. Thomas Wilson, Sons, & Co.
28 August	Walmer Castle	East Indiaman	William Pile Jr.	Sunderland	United Kingdom	For Green & Co.
29 August	Georgina	West Indiaman	T. R. Carke Jr.	Liverpool	United Kingdom	For Messrs. Yates, Brown & Co.
29 August	Mary and Jane	Sloop	Hugh Banister	Tarleton	United Kingdom	For Thomas Harrison & James Taylor.
29 August	Royal Arthur	Barque	John Lugars	King's Lynn	United Kingdom	For private owner.
29 August	Siam	Clipper	Messrs. Bayled & Sons	Ipswich	United Kingdom	For private owner.
29 August	Victoria	Steamship	Canada Works	Birkenhead	United Kingdom	For private owner.
30 August	Royal Charter	Auxiliary clipper	Sandycroft Ironworks	Deeside	United Kingdom	For Liverpool & Australian Steamship Navigation Company.
August	Alliance	Merchantman	Jobling & Co., or Jobling & Willoughby	Sunderland	United Kingdom	For Gray & Co.
August	Eliza	Brig		Lemmer	Netherlands	For private owner.
August	Emerald	Full-rigged ship		East Boston, Massachusetts	United States	For Messrs. Howland & Ridgway.
August	Florence Nightingale	Barque			(United Kingdom of Great Britain and Ireland) Colony of Nova Scotia	For private owner.
August	Princess Maria	Merchantman			United Kingdom	For private owner.
August	Regina	Merchantman	Mansfield	Teignmouth	United Kingdom	For private owner.
1 September	Barcelona	Steamship	John Laird	Birkenhead	United Kingdom	For Linea de Vapores Correos Españoles Transatlanticos.
2 September	Sandfly	Albacore-class gunboat	Pitcher	Northfleet	United Kingdom	For Royal Navy.
2 September	Sheldrake	Albacore-class gunboat	Pitcher	Northfleet	United Kingdom	For Royal Navy.
4 September	Fulton	Paddle steamer	Smith and Dimon Shipyard	New York	United Kingdom	For New York and Havre Steam Navigation Company.
8 September	Plover	Albacore-class gunboat	Pitcher	Northfleet	United Kingdom	For Royal Navy.
8 September	Tickler	Albacore-class gunboat	Pitcher	Northfleet	United Kingdom	For Royal Navy.
12 September	Chesapeake	Forte-class frigate			United Kingdom	For Royal Navy.
12 September	Jessamine	Snow	Robert Thompson	Sunderland	United Kingdom	For Watson & Co.
12 September	Sir Colin Campbell	Steamship	Messrs. Richardson	East Hartlepool	United Kingdom	For Richard Young.
13 September	Chancellor	Barque	Rawson & Watson	Sunderland	United Kingdom	For Mr. Watson.
13 September	Elegant	Barque	Messrs. J. P. Dennison & Co	East Hartlepool	United Kingdom	For private owner.
13 September	Pearl	Pearl-class corvette	Woolwich Dockyard	Woolwich	United Kingdom	For Royal Navy.
13 September	Test	Steamship	Messrs. Cato, Miller & Co.	Liverpool	United Kingdom	For private owner.
17 September	Retvizan	Ship of the line	New Admiralty Shipyard	Saint Petersburg	Russia	For Imperial Russian Navy.
18 September	Tchernaya	Full-rigged ship		Quebec	(United Kingdom of Great Britain and Ireland) Province of Canada	Ran aground on being launched.
25 September	Gitana	Steamship	Messrs. Smith's	North Shields	United Kingdom	For West Hartlepool Harbour and Railway Company.
26 September	Robert Jones	Merchantman		Penmaenpool	United Kingdom	For Robert Jones.
26 September	Satellite	Pearl-class corvette		Devonport Dockyard	United Kingdom	For Royal Navy.
26 September	Star of Peace	Clipper	Messrs. Walter Hood & Co.	Aberdeen	United Kingdom	For George Thompson Jr.
27 September	Borysthene	Steamship	John Laird	Liverpool	United Kingdom	For Compagnie des Messageries Imperiales.
27 September	Ceres	Barque	Austin & Mills	Southwick	United Kingdom	For M. Sharp.
27 September	City of Durham	Barque	John T. Alcock	Sunderland	United Kingdom	For Thomas Nicholson.
27 September	Graces	Barque	Robert Thompson Jr.	Sunderland	United Kingdom	For T. Coxon.
27 September	Hannah Marks	Barque	John Smith	Pallion	United Kingdom	For A. J. Marks.
27 September	Ossian	Steamship	Messrs. J. & G. Thomson	Govan	United Kingdom	For private owner.
27 September	Richard Roberts	Schooner	Evan Ellis	Porthdinllaen	United Kingdom	For private owner.
27 September	Repulse	Agamemnon-class ship of the line		Pembroke Dockyard	United Kingdom	For Royal Navy.
September	Ardmillan	Full-rigged ship	McCord	Quebec	(United Kingdom of Great Britain and Ireland) Province of Canada	For private owner.
2 October	Glenealn	Barque	Messrs. John & James Robinson	Sunderland	United Kingdom	For William Dixon.
3 October	Cadiz	Snow	W. Johnson	Coxgreen	United Kingdom	For Mr. Collingwood.
3 October	Nithsdale	Barque	W. Wilkinson	Pallion	United Kingdom	For Messrs. Watson & Co.
4 October	Algésiras	Algésiras-class ship of the line		Arsenal de Toulon	France	For French Navy.
4 October	Unnamed	Barque	W. Scowler	Sunderland	United Kingdom	For M. Tweddle.
6 October	Niels Juel	Frigate		Copenhagen	Denmark	For Royal Danish Navy.
6 October	Not named	Gunboat	Green	Blackwall	United Kingdom	For Peruvian Navy.
8 October	Daring	Medium clipper	George W. Jackman	Newburyport, Massachusetts	United States	For Bush & Comstock.
8 October	Juventa	Barque	Thomas & Benjamin Tiffin	Sunderland	United Kingdom	For Wilson & Co.
11 October	Allies	Steamship	Messrs. Palmer, Brothers, & Co	Newcastle upon Tyne	United Kingdom	For C. Baker.
11 October	Brenda	Steamship	Messrs. Palmer, Brothers, & Co	Newcastle upon Tyne	United Kingdom	For Messrs. Robinson & Co.
11 October	Brigadier	Steamship	Messrs. Palmer, Brothers, & Co.	Newcastle upon Tyne	United Kingdom	For Messrs. William Laing & Co.
11 October	Emily	Schooner		Bombay	India	For British East India Company.
11 October	Wave	Snow	Bowman and Drummond	Blyth	United Kingdom	For Simpson & Co.
12 October	Fair Wind	Clipper	E. & H. O. Briggs	South Boston, Massachusetts	United States	For Henry Hallett & Co.
13 October	Borussia	Steamship	Messrs. M. Samuelson & Co.	Hull	United Kingdom	For Harburg English Steam Navigation Company.
15 October	Flower of the Sea	Steamship	Teall	Ringsend	United Kingdom	For private owner.
16 October	Relief	Lightship	Halpin	Dublin	United Kingdom	For Trinity House.
20 October	Banterer	Albacore-class gunboat	Pitcher	Northfleet	United Kingdom	For Royal Navy.
20 October	Bullfrog	Albacore-class gunboat	Pitcher	Northfleet	United Kingdom	For Royal Navy.
23 October	Ganger Rolf	Steamship	Messrs. Caird & Co.	Cartsdyke	United Kingdom	For South of Norway Steamship Company.
24 October	Wabash	Colorado-class frigate	Philadelphia Navy Yard	Philadelphia, Pennsylvania	United States	For United States Navy.
25 October	Belle Alliance	Full-rigged ship	Arrow Leithead	Sunderland	United Kingdom	For Mr. Richardson.
25 October	Fidus	Barque	Peter Austin	Sunderland	United Kingdom	For J. Mills.
25 October	Plummer	Schooner	Messrs. John & R. White	Cowes	United Kingdom	For private owner.
25 October	Redoutable	Algésiras-class ship of the line		Rochefort	France	For French Navy.
27 October	Spartan	Steamship	Messrs. Smith & Roger	Govan	United Kingdom	For Messrs. H. Dixon & Co.
29 October	Aberdeenshire	Steamship	Messrs. W. Simmons & Co.	Whiteinch	United Kingdom	For private owners.
October	Chowdean	Barque	G. Gardner	Sunderland	United Kingdom	For J. Tully.
October	Dvenadtsat Apostolov	Ship of the line		Nicholaieff	Russia	For Imperial Russian Navy.
October	Khersonese	Steamship	Messrs. Hickson & Co.	Belfast	United Kingdom	For British Government.
October	Westminster	Merchantman		Stockton-on-Tees	United Kingdom	For private owner.
2 November	Victor	Intrepid-class gunvessel	Money, Wigram & Son	Blackwall	United Kingdom	For Royal Navy.
3 November	Valdivia	Steamship	Messrs. Lumley, Kennedy & Co.	Whitehaven	United Kingdom	For Messrs. Nicholson & McGill.
10 November	Edinburgh	Steamship	Messrs. Tod & McGregor	Kelvinside	United Kingdom	For Glasgow and New York Steam Shipping Company.
12 November	Sea Sprite	Schooner	Messrs. Stewart & Forbes	Peterhead	United Kingdom	For Messrs. George Craig & Co.
12 November	Yonne	Transport ship		Cherbourg	France	For French Navy.
13 November	Intrepid	Intrepid-class gunvessel	Wigram	London	United Kingdom	For Royal Navy.
13 November	Saxonia	Steamship	Messrs. H. Samuelson & Co.	Hull	United Kingdom	For Harburg English Steam Navigation Company.
15 November	Eugenie	Barque	Messrs. Steele & Co.	Greenock	United Kingdom	For Messrs. Baine & Johnston.
15 November	Maria	Steamship	Messrs. Caird & Co.	Greenock	United Kingdom	For Risca Steam Coal Co.
17 November	Electric Spark	Extreme clipper	Hayden & Cudworth	Medford, Massachusetts	United States	For Thatcher Magoun & Son.
20 November	Golden Fleece	Clipper	Paul Curtis	East Boston, Massachusetts	United States	William Lincoln & Co.
21 November	Goolanar	Steamship		Bombay	India	For British East India Company.
22 November	Fort George	Full-rigged ship	Messrs. William Simons & Co.	Whiteinch	United Kingdom	For Messrs. Clint & Co.
22 November	Wild Hunter	Clipper	Shiverick Brothers	East Dennis, Massachusetts	United States	For Christopher Hall and associates.
24 November	Shannon	Liffey-class frigate		Portsmouth Dockyard	United Kingdom	For Royal Navy.
24 November	Thalia	Steamship	Messrs. Scott & Co.	Greenock	United Kingdom	For private owner.
November	Abbott Lawrence	Clipper	Donald McKay	East Boston, Massachusetts	United States	For private owner.
November	Arctic	Sealer	John Duncay	Speymouth	United Kingdom	For private owners.
November	Destello	Steamship	W. C. Miller	Toxteth	United Kingdom	For private owner.
November	Dreadnought	Lifeboat	Messrs. White	Cowes	United Kingdom	Broadstairs Lifeboat.
November	Dutchman	Merchantman		Waterford	United Kingdom	For private owner.
November	Meandria	Steamship	John Laird	Liverpool	United Kingdom	For private owner.
November	Rota	Steamship	Messrs. Thomas Vernon & Co.	Liverpool	United Kingdom	For Messrs. W. J. Myers & Co.
November	Percy	Snow	Hylton Carr	Hylton	United Kingdom	For Barry & Co.
1 December	Minnesota	Steam Frigate		Washington Navy Yard	United States	For United States Navy.
7 December	Cora	Steamship	Portland Shipbuilding Company	Troon	United Kingdom	For private owner.
8 December	Forward	Albacore-class gunboat	W. & H. Pitcher	Northfleet	United Kingdom	For Royal Navy.
11 December	Ernestine	Steamship	Messrs. M. Samueson & Co.	Hull	United Kingdom	For private owners.
11 December	Florence Nightingale	Steamship	Messrs. Richardson Bros.	Hartlepool	United Kingdom	For Mr. Young.
13 December	Roanoke	Merrimack-class frigate		New York Navy Yard	United States	For United States Navy.
15 December	Isabella	Schooner	Webster	Fraserburgh	United Kingdom	For J. A. Flett.
28 December	John D. Jones	Pilot boat	J. B. & J. D. Van Deusen	Williamsburg, New York	United States	For New York Pilots.
December	Charger	Albacore-class gunboat	Messrs. Pitcher	Northfleet	United Kingdom	For Royal Navy.
December	C. Vanderbilt	Paddle steamer	J. Simonson	New York	United States	For private owner.
December	Flying Fish	Despatch boat		Pembroke Dockyard	United Kingdom	For Royal Navy.
December	Marmora	Collier	Messrs. Palmer Bros.	Jarrow	United Kingdom	For C. D. Barker.
December	Minna	Steamship	Messrs. Palmer Bros.	Jarrow	United Kingdom	For St. Petersburg Steam Ship Company.
December	Rubens	Merchantman	M. Guibert	Nantes	United Kingdom	For Compagnie Générale Maritime.
December	The Times Correspondent	Merchantman		West Hartlepool	United Kingdom	For private owner.
Spring	Brilliant	Brig		St. Mary's	(United Kingdom of Great Britain and Ireland) Colony of Nova Scotia	For private owner.
Autumn	Brunelle	Full-rigged ship		Quebec	(United Kingdom of Great Britain and Ireland) Province of Canada	For private owner.
Autumn	Florence	Full-rigged ship		Quebec	(United Kingdom of Great Britain and Ireland) Province of Canada	For private owner.
Unknown date	Acastus	Barque	Pile & Smart	Sunderland	United Kingdom	For J. & J. S. Twizell.
Unknown date	Aid	Brig	Pickersgill & Miller	Sunderland	United Kingdom	For Gideon Smales.
Unknown date	Aletheia	Barque	Peter Austin	Sunderland	United Kingdom	For S. Austin.
Unknown date	Alliance	Barque	John Smith	Pallion	United Kingdom	For H. Tindall.
Unknown date	Allied Powers	Barque	W. H. Pearson	Sunderland	United Kingdom	For Jobling & Co.
Unknown date	Alma	Sloop		Sunderland	United Kingdom	For G. Dowell.
Unknown date	Alma	Steamship	John Laird	Birkenhead	United Kingdom	For Admiralty.
Unknown date	Alma	Schooner	Brundrit & Whiteway	Runcorn	United Kingdom	For Brundrit & Whiteway.
Unknown date	Alpha	Snow	Stothard	Sunderland	United Kingdom	For Mr. Jackson.
Unknown date	Antias	Brig	Rawson & Watson	Sunderland	United Kingdom	For G. Smales.
Unknown date	Aphrogencia	Merchantman	E. Bailey	Sunderland	United Kingdom	For J. Leslie.
Unknown date	Arctic	Steamship		Philadelphia Navy Yard	United States	For United States Navy.
Unknown date	Armistice	Merchantman	Richard Wilkinson	Sunderland	United Kingdom	For J. Longton.
Unknown date	Arthur	Barque		Amesbury, Massachusetts	United States	For private owner.
Unknown date	Asahi Maru	Full-rigged ship		Edo	Japan	For Imperial Japanese Navy.
Unknown date	Aurora	Brig	James & R. Mills	Sunderland	United Kingdom	For Dawson Bros.
Unknown date	Balaklava	Full-rigged ship	Short	Sunderland	United Kingdom	For Mr. Greenwell.
Unknown date	Beatrice	Merchantman	J. Watson	Sunderland	United Kingdom	For Stokoe & Co.
Unknown date	Bellona	Full-rigged ship	Briggs	Sunderland	United Kingdom	For J. Allan.
Unknown date	Benjamin Peirce	Schooner			United States	For private owner.
Unknown date	B. F. Hoxie	Clipper	Mason, Fish & Co.	Mystic, Connecticut	United States	For N. G. Fish & Co..
Unknown date	Black Diamond	Steamship	James Laing	Sunderland	United Kingdom	For J. Hughes et al.
Unknown dat3e	Black Sea	Clipper	Lupton	Greenpoint, New York	United States	For French & Meincke.
Unknown date	Black Watch	Full-rigged ship		Pictou	(United Kingdom of Great Britain and Ireland) Colony of Nova Scotia	For Messrs. Andrew Stewart & Co.
Unknown date	British Banner	Barque	Austin & Mills	Sunderland	United Kingdom	For B. Ward.
Unknown date	Brewster	Clipper	Currier & Townsend	Newburyport, Massachusetts	United States	For W. Clark and others.
Unknown date	Carrier Dove	Clipper	Montell & Co.	Baltimore, Maryland	United States	For Trask & Dearborn.
Unknown date	Carrier Dove	Medium clipper	James Abraham	Baltimore, Maryland	United States	For Montell & Company.
Unknown date	Catherine Adamson	Merchantman	Messrs. Duthie & Co.	Aberdeen	United Kingdom	For private owner.
Unknown date	Catherine and Ann	Snow	J. Lister	Sunderland	United Kingdom	For W. Bunker.
Unknown date	Chasseur	Repair ship and floating arsenal	Messrs. Thomas & William Smith	South Shields	United Kingdom	For unknown owner.
Unknown date	Cherubim	Medium clipper	J. Abraham	Baltimore, Maryland	United States	For D. Currie and others.
Unknown date	Colorado I	Sternwheeler	John Gunder North	San Francisco, California	United States	For George A. Johnson & Company.
Unknown date	Courier	Merchantman	G. Gardener	Sunderland	United Kingdom	For Kelso & Co.
Unknown date	Cresswell	Merchantman	William Harkass	Sunderland	United Kingdom	For C. Jenkins.
Unknown date	Criterion	Clipper	William Hitchcock & Co.	Damariscotta, Maine	United States	For F. Nickerson & Co.
Unknown date	Defender	Clipper	Donald McKay	East Boston, Massachusetts	United States	For Kendall & Plimpton.
Unknown date	Derby	Medium clipper	John Taylor	Chelsea, Massachusetts	United States	For Pickman, Silsbee and others.
Unknown date	Dictator	Clipper	James W. Cox	Robbinston, Maine	United States	For Samuel Train.
Unknown date	Earl of Cromartie	Schooner	Rawson & Watson	Sunderland	United Kingdom	For J. Hill.
Unknown date	Edmund Graham	Full-rigged ship	Robert Thompson	Sunderland	United Kingdom	For Edmund Graham.
Unknown date	Eliza	Brig		Sunderland	United Kingdom	For private owner.
Unknown date	Enoch Train	Icebreaker	James O. Curtis	Medford, Massachusetts	United States	For Boston Steam Tow-boat Co.
Unknown date	Equinox	Merchantman	L. Gales	Sunderland	United Kingdom	For W. Milburn.
Unknown date	Eugenie	Merchantman		Sunderland	United Kingdom	For private owner.
Unknown date	Falcon	Barque	Forrest & Jackson, or Forrest & Co.	Sunderland	United Kingdom	For W. Hay.
Unknown date	Fear Not	Barque	J. Lister	Sunderland	United Kingdom	For J. & E. Douthwaite.
Unknown date	Forerunner	Full-rigged ship	D. Douglass	Sunderland	United Kingdom	For R. Hudson.
Unknown date	Gayvan Bakry	Frigate		Sinope	Ottoman Empire	For Ottoman Navy.
Unknown date	Geelong	Barque	John Smith	Pallion	United Kingdom	For G. Gray.
Unknown date	George and Maria	Snow	R. Sanderson	Sunderland	United Kingdom	For G. Downie.
Unknown date	Gharra	Barque	Todd & Brown	Sunderland	United Kingdom	For Heald & Co.
Unknown date	Godavery	Barque	M. Clarke	Sunderland	United Kingdom	For George Thompson & James Bambrough.
Unknown date	Goddess	Clipper	Hayden & Cudworth	Medford, Massachusetts	United States	For Baxter Brothers.
Unknown date	Good Hope	Clipper	J. O. Curtiss	Medford, Massachusetts	United States	For R. L. Taylor.
Unknown date	Greetings	Merchantman	John Smith	Pallion	United Kingdom	For private owner.
Unknown date	Guadiana	Merchantman	Peter Gibson	Sunderland	United Kingdom	For C. H. T. Borries, M. W. Sidney, J. Stevenson, and E. H. Watts.
Unknown date	Harriet	Barque	Forrest & Co	Sunderland	United Kingdom	For H. Henderson, T. Henderson & J. E. Henderson.
Unknown date	Harry Bluff	Clipper	Jotham Stetson	Chelsea, Massachusetts	United States	For Charles R. Green.
Unknown date	Harry of the West	Clipper	Robert E. Jackson	East Boston, Massachusetts	United States	For Calvin Adams.
Unknown date	Havannah	Steamship	John Laird	Birkenhead	United Kingdom	For private owner.
Unknown date	Hawk	Steam Yacht	John Laird	Birkenhead	United Kingdom	For Lord Hill.
Unknown date	Heda	Schooner		Heda	Japan	For Imperial Russian Navy.
Unknown date	Herald	Paddle steamer		Sydney	(United Kingdom of Great Britain and Ireland) New South Wales	For North Shore Steam Company.
Unknown date	Industry	Full-rigged ship	T. Seymour	Sunderland	United Kingdom	For G. Forster.
Unknown date	Iona	Paddle steamer			United Kingdom	For Nantucket and Cape Cod Steamboat Company.
Unknown date	Island Home	Steamboat		Greenpoint, New York	United States	For New Haven Steamboat Company.
Unknown date	Jane Anna	Merchantman	William Harkass	Sunderland	United Kingdom	For G. Shotton.
Unknown date	Jane Strong	Barque	Hume & Esson	Sunderland	United Kingdom	For A. Strong.
Unknown date	J. A. Smith	Canal boat	Morgan L. Taylor	New York City	United States	For private owner
Unknown date	John Milton	Clipper		Fairhaven, Massachusetts	United States	For G. Hussey and others.
Unknown date	Jubilant	Barque	Haswell	Sunderland	United Kingdom	For James Hay.
Unknown date	La Hogue	Full-rigged ship	James Laing	Sunderland	United Kingdom	For Duncan Dunbar & Sons.
Unknown date	Lancaster Number 3	Tow boat		Cincinnati, Ohio	United States	For private owner.
Unknown date	Larissa	Merchantman	L. Gales	Sunderland	United Kingdom	For Mr. Davison.
Unknown date	Light of the Age	Clipper	J. Stetson	Boston, Massachusetts	United States	For Marshall & Eldridge's Line.
Unknown date	Lobelia	Full-rigged ship	J. T. & C. Alcock	Sunderland	United Kingdom	For J. Alcock.
Unknown date	Loda	Merchantman	James Robinson	Sunderland	United Kingdom	For J. Bowes.
Unknown date	Lowestoft	Steamship	James Laing	Sunderland	United Kingdom	For J. V. Gooch & Co.
Unknown date	Madeira	Barque	George Worthy	Sunderland	United Kingdom	For Ord & Co.
Unknown date	Mameluke	Clipper	E. & H. O. Briggs	South Boston, Massachusetts	United States	For Curtis & Peabody.
Unknown date	Mangosteen	Barque	W. Harkass	Sunderland	United Kingdom	For John Nicholson, William Nicholson & William Nicholson Jr.
Unknown date	Manitou	Clipper		Petty Island, New Jersey	United States	For Stillwell S. Bishop.
Unknown date	Marian	Barque	Bowman and Drummond	Blyth	United Kingdom	For William MacKey and William Archibald MacKey.
Unknown date	Mary Houghton	Schooner	Brundrit & Whiteway	Runcorn	United Kingdom	For private owner.
Unknown date	Mary Louisa	Merchantman	J. Hardie	Sunderland	United Kingdom	For James Hardie.
Unknown date	Mary Whitridge	Medium clipper	Hunt & Wagner	Baltimore, Maryland	United States	For Thomas Whitridge & Co.
Unknown date	Meg Merillies	Barque	Pickersgill & Miller	Sunderland	United Kingdom	For W. Doxford.
Unknown date	Miss Nightingale	Merchantman	J. Hardie	Sunderland	United Kingdom	For Mr. Haddock.
Unknown date	Napoleon III	Barque	J. Rogerson	Sunderland	United Kingdom	For A. Strong & Co.
Unknown date	Noonday	Medium clipper	Fernald & Pettigrew	Portsmouth, New Hampshire	United States	For Henry Hastings.
Unknown date	Northumbria's Daughter	Merchantman		Sunderland	United Kingdom	For W. Crawford.
Unknown date	Orient	Merchantman	George Barker	Sunderland	United Kingdom	For Scofield & Co.
Unknown date	Penmaen	Sloop	Brundrit & Whiteway	Runcorn	United Kingdom	For Brundrit & Whiteway.
Unknown date	Panellinion	Steamship	Henderson Shipyard		Greece	For Royal Greek Navy.
Unknown date	Prince Argentino	Paddle steamer	Messrs. H. Balfour & Co.	Methil	United Kingdom	For private owners.
Unknown date	Queen of Greece	Steamship	William Pile Jr.	Sunderland	United Kingdom	For G. Stavros.
Unknown date	Rafale	Gunboat		Toulon	France	For French Navy.
Unknown date	Ravenswheel	Snow	T. Stonehouse	Sunderland	United Kingdom	For T. Stonehouse.
Unknown date	Remi	Steamship	W. Pile	Sunderland	United Kingdom	For Mr. Schmidt.
Unknown date	Retriever	Barque	Bank Quay Company	Warrington	United Kingdom	For Messrs. Leech, Harrison & Forewood.
Unknown date	Rival	Merchantman	W. Pile	Sunderland	United Kingdom	For private owner.
Unknown date	Rival	Clipper	Hayden & Cudworth	Medford, Massachusetts	United States	For Howes & Crowell.
Unknown date	Robert Hay	Barque	James Robertson	Sunderland	United Kingdom	For R. Hay.
Unknown date	Sancho Panza	Medium clipper	Hayden & Cudworth	Medford, Massachusetts	United States	For John Ellerton Lodge.
Unknown date	Salve	Poudre-class gunboat		Nantes	France	For French Navy.
Unknown date	Sanderson	Barque	T. Stonehouse	Sunderland	United Kingdom	For Mr. Sanderson.
Unknown date	Sarah Kay	Barque	Todd & Brown	Sunderland	United Kingdom	For T. Kay.
Unknown date	Savannah	Merchantman	J. Watson	Sunderland	United Kingdom	For Bell & Co.
Unknown date	Shawsheen	Tugboat		New York City	United States	For private owner.
Unknown date	Sir Colin Campbell	Steamship	G. Booth	Sunderland	United Kingdom	For W. H. Alexander.
Unknown date	Sovereign	Paddle steamer		Shousetown, Pennsylvania	United States	For private owner
Unknown date	Stadt Zürich	Steamboat	Escher Wyss et Compagnie	Escher Wyss	Switzerland	For Swiss Northeastern Railway.
Unknown date	Star of Hope	Clipper		Portsmouth, New Hampshire	United States	For private owner.
Unknown date	Surprize	Snow	J. Jobling, or Jobling & Co	Sunderland	United Kingdom	For Mr. Swinburn.
Unknown date	Tennessee	Barque	H. Carr	South Hylton	United Kingdom	For James Wilson.
Unknown date	Thatcher Magoun	Clipper	Hayden & Cudworth	Medford, Massachusetts	United States	For Thatcher Magoun & Sons
Unknown date	Thomas Varcoe	Schooner	J. Hardie	Sunderland	United Kingdom	For J. Varcoe.
Unknown date	Titian	Medium clipper	Roosevelt & Joyce	New York	United States	For Daniel C. Bacon.
Unknown date	United	Snow	Ratcliff, Spence & Co.	Sunderland	United Kingdom	For Mr. Ratcliff.
Unknown date	Vibilia	Snow	Reay	Sunderland	United Kingdom	For Reed & Co.
Unknown date	Victoria	Steamship		Kensington, Pennsylvania	United States	For private owner.
Unknown date	Vitula	Clipper	E. & H. O. Briggs	locn	United States	For Williams & Daland.
Unknown date	Walmer Castle	Full-rigged ship	W. Pile	Sunderland	United Kingdom	For Green & Co.
Unknown date	William James	Merchantman	J. Hardie	Sunderland	United Kingdom	For James Hardie.
Unknown date	Witch of the Seas	Barque	J. Barkes	Sunderland	United Kingdom	For Mr. Thompson.
Unknown date	Witch of the Seas	Barque	M. Clarke	Sunderland	United Kingdom	For J. Huntley.
Unknown date	Young America	Steamship			United States	For private owner
Unknown date	Zenobia	Merchantman	Hodgson & Gardener	Sunderland	United Kingdom	For Mr. Johnson.
Unknown date	Zouave	Schooner	William Bonker	Salcombe	United Kingdom	For Edward D. Glynn and others.
