= Aetna-class ironclad floating battery =

1855 class of British ironclad floating batteries

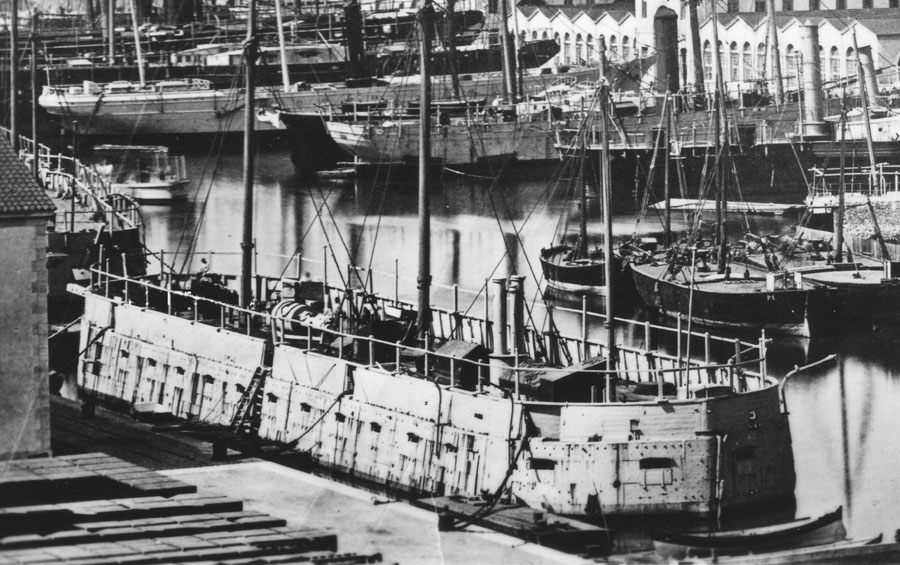
- Lave, one of the Aetna class's French half-sisters.

Class overview
- Name: Aetna class
- Operators: Royal Navy
- Succeeded by: Erebus class
- Built: 1854–1856
- In service: 1855–1873
- Planned: 5
- Building: 6
- Completed: 5
- Lost: 2
- Retired: 4

General characteristics
- Type: Ironclad floating battery
- Tons burthen: 1,469 BOM; 1,535 BOM broad beam; 1,588 BOM lengthened Aetna
- Length: Overall; 172 ft 6 in (52.58 m); 186 ft 0 in (56.69 m) lengthened Aetna; Keel; 146 ft 0 in (44.50 m); 157 ft 9 in (48.08 m) lengthened Aetna
- Beam: 43 ft 11 in (13.39 m); 45 ft 2.5 in (13.780 m) broad beam; 43 ft 11 in (13.39 m) lengthened Aetna; For tonnage; 43 ft 6 in (13.26 m); 44 ft 9.5 in (13.653 m) broad beam; 43 ft 6 in (13.26 m) lengthened Aetna
- Draught: 8 ft 8 in (2.64 m); 6 ft 0 in (1.83 m) lengthened Aetna
- Propulsion: 1 × screw propeller; 2 × cylinder horizontal single expansion 150 nhp engines generating 530 ihp (400 kW) on Meteor's trials.; (200 nhp for lengthened Aetna)
- Sail plan: 3 masts, 885 m^{2} (9,530 sq ft) sail
- Speed: 4.5–5.5 knots (8.3–10.2 km/h); 4 knots (7.4 km/h) lengthened Aetna
- Complement: 200
- Armament: 14 × 68-pounder 95 cwt smoothbores; (16 × 68-pounder 95 cwt smoothbores for lengthened Aetna)
- Armour: 3.5–4 in (89–102 mm) wrought iron; 4 in (100 mm) wrought iron lengthened Aetna

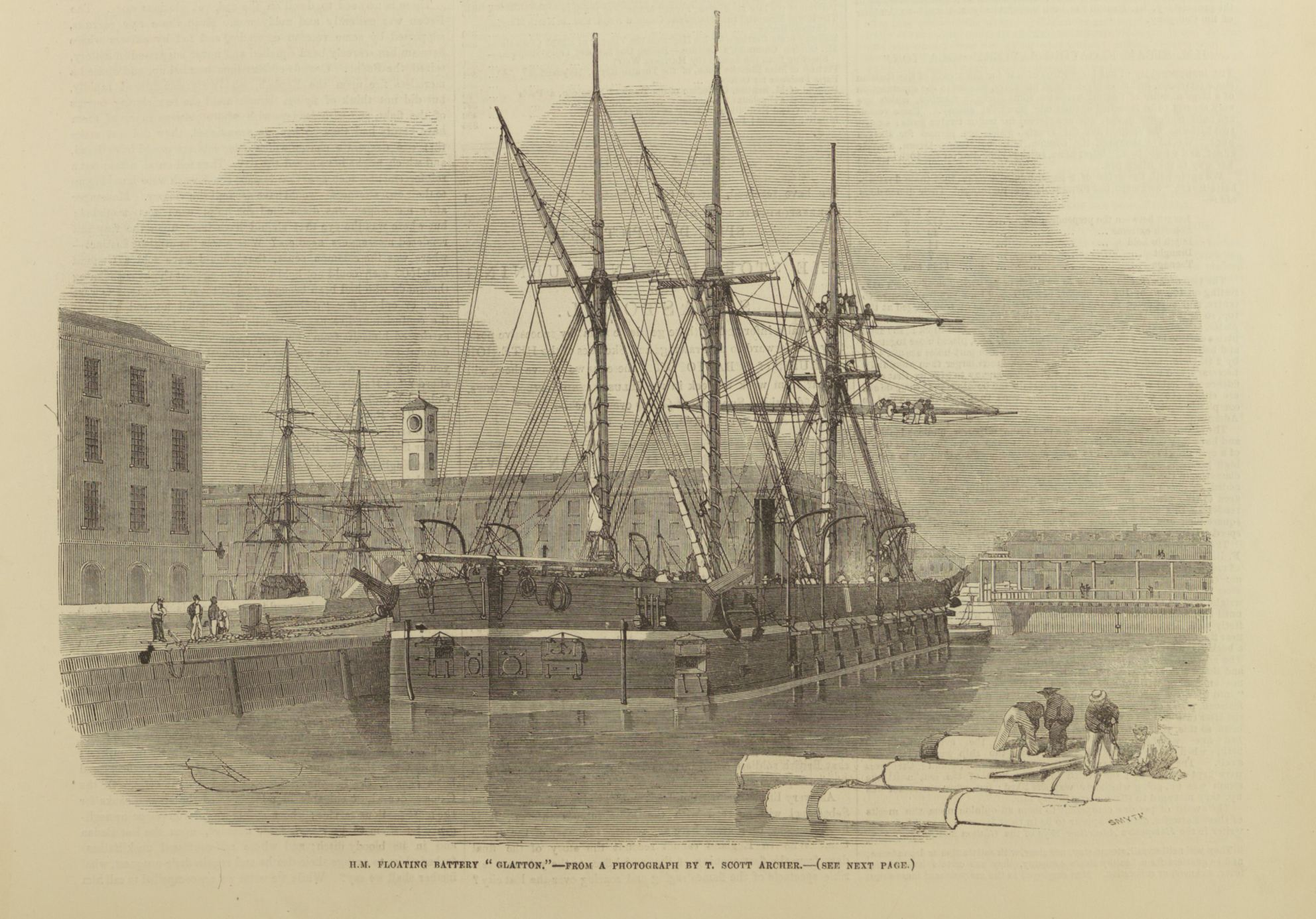
HM Floating Battery Glatton in 1855

The Aetna-class ironclad floating batteries were built during the Crimean War for the attack of Russian coastal fortifications.

Britain and France each laid down five of these coastal attack vessels in 1854. The French used three of their batteries in 1855 against the defences at Kinburn on the Black Sea, where they were effective against Russian shore defences. The British plan to use theirs in the Baltic Sea against Kronstadt in 1856 was influential in causing the Russians to sue for peace. The development of such iron-armoured batteries was a step towards the development of ironclad warships. "These armoured batteries were among the most revolutionary ships ever built and provided British and French designers with the germ of the battleship."

One of the British batteries, Trusty, was used for trials in 1861 with a prototype rotating turret, based on Captain Cowper Phipps Coles' designs.

== Genesis ==
Emperor Napoleon III initiated the design of armoured steam-powered batteries for the French Navy. The original idea was to protect the sides with boxes of cannonballs, but the British engineer Thomas Lloyd suggested using thick wrought iron plates instead. Trials at Vincennes showed that Lloyd's idea was more effective, so it was adopted.

Napoleon wanted ten floating batteries built in time for the 1855 campaign, but as French industry could only build five in time, France's British allies were asked to build the other five. Unfortunately the First Lord, Sir James Graham, confused this concept with the unsuccessful iron-hulled frigates built in the late 1840s, and asked for further trials, so the British armoured batteries were not ordered until 4 October 1854.

== Design ==
These vessels were copies of the French Dévastation-class batteries. The French batteries carried 16 guns, but had 24 gun ports. The British Aetna class were also intended to carry 16 guns, but the first four completed only carried 14 guns to reduce draught to 8 feet 8 inches (2.64 m). The Admiralty design drawing showed them with 32 gunports. These ports were very large – 34 by 40 inches (0.86 by 1.02 m).

The wooden-hulled Aetna class had "straight vertical sides and a flat bottom with a very bluff bow and stern. Their armour plates, nominally 4 inches (102 mm), but in many cases were rolled 0.25–0.5 inches (6.4–12.7 mm) under thickness, were locked together with tongue and groove joints." The iron armour was supported by 20-inch-thick (510 mm) oak sides. The wooden upper deck was 9 inches (229 mm) thick. There were two conning towers protected by 5/8 inch (16 mm) wrought iron plate.

In October 1858, experimental firing trials were undertaken against Meteor and one of the follow-on class of iron-hulled armoured batteries, Erebus. These demonstrated the importance of wooden backing for the armour, as Meteor put up far better resistance than Erebus, where the frames were displaced by concussion.

== Machinery ==
The first four completed had two-cylinder 25.5 in (0.65 m) diameter 24 in (0.61 m) stroke horizontal single expansion engines of 150 nhp, which operated at 62 psi (430 kPa). Although they were completed as single screw vessels, Meteor was altered to triple screw with wing-shafts; her trials with triple screw were 12 days after her trials with single screw. The most likely method of driving the wing shafts was a belt arrangement, which was common practice at the time. It is unclear whether any of the others were also altered to triple-screw.

On trials with a single 6 ft (1.8 m) diameter, 12 ft 6 in (3.81 m) pitch screw, Meteor reached 5.7 kn (10.6 km/h) at 139 rpm with the safety valve set at 60 psi, and engine power was recorded as 530 ihp (400 kW). On her trials fitted as triple screw, Meteor reached 5.25 knots (9.72 km/h) at 139 rpm. Engine power was recorded as 498 indicated horsepower (371 kW). The two wing screws on this trial were 6 ft (1.8 m) diameter, 7 ft 6 in (2.29 m) pitch.

The second Aetna had two-cylinder 27 in (0.69 m) diameter 30 in (0.76 m) stroke horizontal single expansion engines of 200 nhp. Her boilers were salvaged from the first Aetna.

== Building programme ==
Ships of the class
Ship	(a) Hull builder (b) Main machinery manufacturers	Ordered	Laid down	Launched	Completed	Initial cost			Total initial cost
Ship	(a) Hull builder (b) Main machinery manufacturers	Ordered	Laid down	Launched	Completed	Hull	Machinery	to complete for sea	Total initial cost
Aetna class
Aetna (i)	(a) J Scott Russell, Millwall (b) J Scott Russell	4 Oct 1854	9 Oct 1854	3 May 1855	Never	Never delivered, caught fire during construction			
Meteor	(a) CJ Mare & Co, Limehouse (b) Maudslay, Sons & Field	4 Oct 1854	9 Oct 1854	17 Apr 1855	4 Jul 1855	£43,799	£10,123	£7,468	£61,390
Thunder	(a) CJ Mare & Co, Limehouse (b) Miller, Ravenshill & Co	4 Oct 1854	9 Oct 1854	17 Apr 1855	21 Jul 1855	£43,784	£10,343	£8,210	£62,337
Broad beam Aetna class
Glatton	(a) R & H Green, Limehouse (no 314) (b) Miller, Ravenshill & Co	4 Oct 1854	9 Oct 1854	18 Apr 1855	3 Aug 1855	£43,479	£11,244	£5,858	£60,581
Trusty	(a) R & H Green, Limehouse (no 315) (b) Miller, Ravenshill & Co	4 Oct 1854	9 Oct 1854	3 May 1855	13 Jun 1855	£43,491	£10,446	£10,004	£63,941
Lengthened Aetna class
Aetna (ii)	(a) Chatham Dockyard (b) Maudslay, Sons & Field	16 Nov 1855	25 Nov 1855	5 Apr 1856	1866; Harbour service	£38,357	£11,000	£495	£49,852

Admiralty records for Meteor, Thunder, Glatton and Trusty state that both the Mare and the Green yards were at Limehouse, other vessels built by Mare and by Green were built at Blackwall. It is possible that there is an error in the records, and they were actually built at Blackwall.

== Service ==
The first Aetna was to have been launched on 5 May 1855, but caught fire on the building slip, and launched herself two days early. Her remains were broken up on the river-bank. Her replacement, the second Aetna was finished too late for the Crimean War, and was fitted for harbour service in 1866. She burnt out at Sheerness in 1873 and was broken up in 1874.

Meteor and Glatton were ready in 1855 but reached the Black Sea too late for action. Both were laid up in theatre for the winter, and in the Spring, when peace was signed, they returned home for the great review of April 1856. Thunder and Trusty also took part in the review.

Meteor was used in experimental firing trials in October 1858. She was broken up in 1861.

Trusty was used in trials of the new Armstrong 40-pounder BL in January 1859 and the 100-pounder BL in September 1859; contrary to expectations, hits on her armour from the 40-pounder and 100-pounder had no serious effect. She was used in trials with a prototype Coles turret in 1861 and in so doing became the first warship to be fitted with a turret. She was broken up by Castle at Charlton in 1864. Glatton was also broken up in 1864.

Thunder was broken up at Chatham in June 1874.
