= French ironclad floating battery Tonnante =

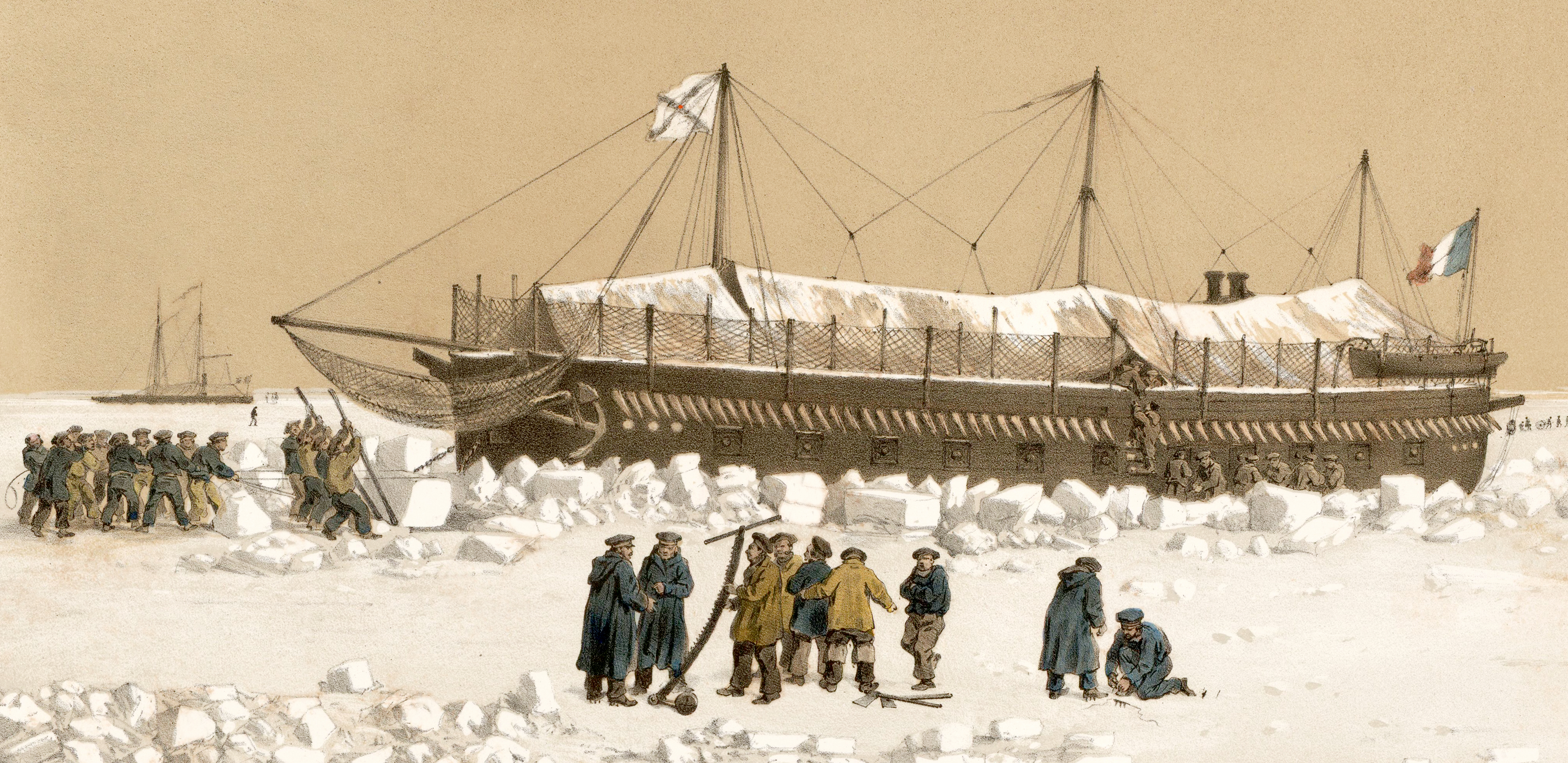
- Tonnante wintering between 1855 and 1856.

History

France
- Ordered: 28 July 1854
- Builder: Arsenal de Brest
- Laid down: 5 September 1854
- Launched: 17 March 1855
- Commissioned: 30 July 1855
- Stricken: 31 August 1871
- Fate: Sold to be broken up

General characteristics
- Class & type: Dévastation-class ironclad floating battery
- Displacement: 1,575 metric tons (1,550 long tons)
- Length: 52.35 m (171.8 ft) (o/a
- Beam: 13.14 m (43.1 ft)
- Draught: 2.54 m (8 ft 4 in)
- Installed power: 6 × locomotive boilers; 430 indicated horsepower (320 kW)
- Propulsion: 1 × shaft, 2-cylinder steam engine
- Sail plan: Three-masted, 885 m^{2} (9,530 sq ft)
- Speed: 4 knots (7.4 km/h; 4.6 mph)
- Complement: 280 or 282
- Armament: 16 × 30-pounder 194 mm (7.6 in) guns; 2 × 18-pounder 138.7 mm (5.5 in)
- Armour: Belt: 110 mm (4.3 in); Battery: 100 mm (3.9 in)

Tonnante was a Dévastation-class ironclad floating battery of the French Navy that served during the 19th century. The Dévastation class were designed in response to the needs of the Crimea War. The ships were armed with sixteen 30-pounder 194 mm (7.6 in) guns and protected by armor belt that was 110 mm (4.3 in) thick. They were underpowered and able to attain less than 4 knots (7 km/h; 5 mph) in service. Launched in 1855, Tonnante was towed to the battlefield by paddle frigate Darien and participated in the Battle of Kinburn, shelling a Russian fortress on the Kinburn Spit. Despite taking 55 hits from the defenders' guns, the ship only suffered with nine sailors injured. The fortress surrendered and the action encouraged the development of ironclads in navies across the world. Subsequently, the warship served in a siege flotilla in the Second Italian War of Independence in 1859, where the presence of the ships proved sufficient to deter the Austro-Hungarian Navy from taking part in the conflict. Tonnante was broken up from 1872.

== Design and development ==
The Dévastation-class was a class of ironclad floating batteries designed during the Crimea War. The design was ordered by Napoleon III after the Battle of Sinope using lessons learned by the French Navy from the conflict. They were fitted with a shallow draft so that they could attack Russian coastal forts. They had been designed for use in the Battle of Sevastopol but arrived too late as the city had already fallen. Tonnante was the first to be launched.

Tonnante displaced 1,575 metric tons (1,550 long tons) and 1,668 metric tons (1,642 long tons) at full load. The vessel had an overall length of 52.35 m (171 ft 9 in)and a length of 51.05 m (167 ft 6 in) between perpendiculars. Beam was equal to 13.14 m (43 ft 1 in) and, while mean draft was 2.54 m (8.3 ft), draft was 2.5 m (8.2 ft) forward and 2.8 m (9.2 ft) aft. The vessel was powered by a single high-pressure steam engine with direct connecting rods. The engine had two cylinders, each measuring 0.6 m (2 ft 0 in) in bore and in stroke. It drove a single propeller shaft. Steam was provided by six locomotive boilers that took their water feed from the sea. The engine was rated at 430 indicated horsepower (320 kW) at 120 rpm. The ship carried 100 tonnes (98 long tons; 110 short tons) coal and was originally equipped with three masts that were rigged with square sails on the main and mizzen masts. Total sail area equalled 885 m^{2} (9,530 sq ft). The ship was rated at 4 knots (7 km/h; 5 mph). The Dévastation class were designed to reach 6 knots (11 km/h; 7 mph). However, in service they could only attain between 3.2 knots (6 km/h; 4 mph) and 3.795 knots (7 km/h; 4 mph). The ships proved underpowered and frequently had to rely on other vessels to tow them to their station.

Tonnante carried a main battery of sixteen 30-pounder 194 mm (7.6 in) 16.4 caliber smoothbore guns mounted on a battery deck. The upper deck housed two 18-pounder 138.7 mm (5.5 in) smoothbore guns. The ship had a full-length waterline armor belt that was 110 mm (4.3 in) thick at the waterline and armor to protect the gun battery that was 100 mm (3.9 in) thick. Armored hatch covers protected the gunports and the oak deck was covered with a sheet of iron. The ship's complement numbered 280 or 282 sailors of all ranks. An additional 40 marines could also be carried.

== Construction and career ==
Originally ordered on 28 July 1854 and laid down on 5 September 1854 by the naval shipyard at Brest, Tonnante was launched on 17 March 1855. Initially commissioned for trials on 23 April, the ship was armed at Rochefort on 2 June and left Brest on 30 July, commissioned to serve in the Crimean War, departing for the battlefield towed by the paddle frigate Darien. The vessel arrived in Odesa on 8 October. The warship's first action was to participate in the bombardment of the Russian fortress on Kinburn Spit, On 14 October, the vessel, along with sister ships Dévastation and Lave, departed for the fortress. The weather was too poor to attack on the 16 October but cleared on the following day. The ships moved into position. Tonnante was stationed within 1,500 m (4,900 ft) of the coast. Tonnante commenced firing, shelling the fortress with 1,012 projectiles in four hours. Those inside the fortress responded and managed to achieve 66 hits on the warship's armour before the fortress capitulated. The only casualties were nine injured by two shots that flew in through ports. The vessel subsequently took station on the Dnieper River, where ice meant it was impossible to move until the spring thaw. The ship's service in combat proved the value of armor for naval use and led directly to the development of the monitor during the American Civil War.

At the end of the Crimean War, the ship's rig was reduced. Tonnante returned to France, was rearmed on 5 June 1856 and recommissioned on 5 July at Brest. Placed in the reserve on 18 September 1857, the ship was again recommissioned on 3 June 1859 to serve in the Second Italian War of Independence. For the next two months, the vessel served as part of the siege flotilla in the Adriatic Sea. The presence of the flotilla was sufficient to keep the Austro-Hungarian Navy out of the conflict. At the end of the conflict, the warship was once more placed in reserve on 6 March 1860. Tonnante was struck on 31 August 1871 and transferred to Toulon to be broken up between 1872 and 1874.
