= French ironclad floating battery Dévastation =

Ironclad floating battery of the French Navy

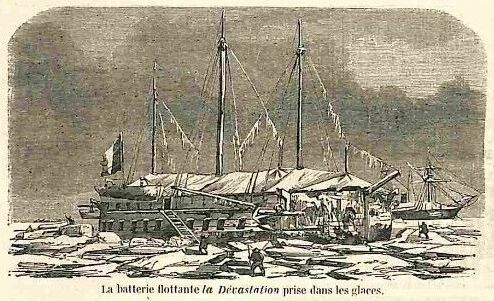
- Dévastation wintering in February 1856

History

France
- Name: Dévastation
- Ordered: 28 July 1854
- Builder: Naval Shipyard, Cherbourg
- Cost: 1,146,489 francs
- Laid down: 5 September 1854
- Launched: 17 April 1855.
- Commissioned: 10 August 1855
- Stricken: 9 May 1871
- Fate: Sold to be broken up

General characteristics (as built)
- Class & type: Dévastation-class ironclad floating battery
- Displacement: 1,575 metric tons (1,550 long tons)
- Length: 52.35 m (171.8 ft) (o/a)
- Beam: 13.14 m (43.1 ft)
- Draught: 2.54 m (8 ft 4 in)
- Installed power: 6 locomotive boilers; 430 ihp (320 kW)
- Propulsion: 1 propeller; 1 direct-acting steam engine
- Speed: 4 knots (7.4 km/h; 4.6 mph)
- Complement: 280 or 282
- Armament: 16 × single 194 mm (7.6 in) 50-pounder guns; 2 × single 138.7 mm (5.5 in) 18-pounder guns or; 2 × 12-pounder carronades
- Armour: Waterline belt: 110 mm (4.3 in); Battery: 100 mm (3.9 in)

Dévastation was the lead ship of the Dévastation-class of ironclad floating batteries that served with the French Navy during the 19th century. The Dévastation class were designed in response to the needs of the Crimea War. The ships were armed with sixteen 50-pounder 194 mm (7.6 in) guns and protected by armor belt that was 110 mm (4.3 in) thick. They were underpowered and able to attain less than 4 knots (7 km/h; 5 mph) in service. Launched in 1855, Dévastation was towed to the battlefield by paddle frigate Albatros and participated in the Battle of Kinburn, shelling a Russian fortress on the Kinburn Spit. Despite taking 72 hits from the defenders' guns, the ship suffered only two fatal casualties and twelve sailors injured before the fortress surrendered. The action encouraged the development of ironclads in navies across the world. Subsequently, the warship served in a siege flotilla in the Second Italian War of Independence in 1859, where the presence of the ships proved sufficient to deter the Austro-Hungarian Navy from taking part in the conflict. Dévastation was broken up in 1871.

== Design and development ==
The Dévastation class was a class of ironclad floating batteries designed during the Crimea War. The design was ordered by Napoleon III after the Battle of Sinope, informed by the experience of the French Navy from the conflict. They were fitted with a shallow draft, which allowed them to operate in shallow waters close to shore and attack Russian coastal forts. They had been designed for use in the Battle of Sevastopol but arrived too late as the city had already fallen before they entered service. Dévastation was the lead ship of the class.

Dévastation displaced 1,575 metric tons (1,550 long tons) and 1,668 metric tons (1,642 long tons) at full load. The vessel had an overall length of 52.35 m (171 ft 9 in) and a length of 51.05 m (167 ft 6 in) between perpendiculars. Beam was equal to 13.14 m (43 ft 1 in) and, while mean draft was 2.54 m (8.3 ft), draft was 2.5 m (8.2 ft) forward and 2.8 m (9.2 ft) aft. The vessel was powered by a single high-pressure steam engine with direct connecting rods. The engine had two cylinders, each measuring 0.6 m (2 ft 0 in) in bore and in stroke. It had a single shaft that drove a single propeller. Steam was provided by six locomotive boilers that took their water feed from the sea. The engine was rated at 430 indicated horsepower (320 kW) at 120 rpm. The ship carried 100 tonnes (98 long tons; 110 short tons) coal. To complement the engine, Dévastation was originally equipped with three masts that were rigged with square sails on the main and mizzen masts. Total sail area equalled 885 m^{2} (9,530 sq ft). The ships were designed to reach 6 knots (11 km/h; 7 mph). During trials Dévastation achieved 3.2 knots (6 km/h; 4 mph) from 457 ihp (341 kW) at 115 rpm and in service could only attain between 3.2 knots (6 km/h; 4 mph) and 3.795 knots (7 km/h; 4 mph). The ships proved underpowered and frequently had to rely on other vessels to tow them to their station.

Dévastation carried a main battery of sixteen 194 mm (7.6 in) 16.4 caliber 50-pounder smoothbore guns mounted on a battery deck. The upper deck housed two 138.7 mm (5.5 in) 18-pounder smoothbore guns or two 12 pounder carronades. The vessel's armor consisted of 183 plates of 110 mm (4.3 in) thick wrought iron made by Creusot Rive-de-Gier, which weighed in total 297.5 metric tons (292.8 long tons; 327.9 short tons). This created a full-length waterline belt that was 110 mm (4.3 in) thick at the waterline. Protection for the gun battery was 100 mm (3.9 in) thick. Armored hatch covers protected the gunports and the oak deck was covered with a sheet of iron. The ship's complement numbered 280 or 282 sailors of all ranks. An additional 40 marines could also be carried.

== Construction and career ==
Originally ordered on 28 July 1854 and laid down on 5 September 1854 by the naval shipyard at Cherbourg, Dévastation was launched on 17 April 1855. The ship cost 1,146,489 francs. Initially commissioned for trials on 25 April, the ship was departed for the Crimean War, departing for the battlefield towed by the paddle frigate Albatros.

Dévastation arrived in Odesa on 8 October. The warship's first action was to participate in the bombardment of the Russian fortress on Kinburn Spit, On 14 October, the vessel, along with sister ships Lave and Tonnante, departed for the fortress. Although the weather was too poor to attack on the 16 October, the ships returned the following day and stationed within 1,500 m (4,900 ft) of the coast. Dévastation commenced firing, shelling the fortress with 1,265 projectiles in four hours. Those inside the fortress responded and managed to achieve 72 hits, of which 31 impacted on the warship's armor, before the fortress capitulated. The only casualties suffered by the crew were two killed and twelve injured, the deaths being the only ones suffered on all three of the floating batteries. The vessel subsequently took station on the Dnieper River, where ice meant it was impossible to move until the spring thaw. The ship's service in combat proved the value of armor for naval use, promoted the adoption of the ironclad by navies across the world, and led directly to the development of the monitor during the American Civil War.

At the end of the Crimean War, Dévastation returned to France. Initially placed in the reserve, the ship was recommissioned in June 1859 to serve in the Second Italian War of Independence. For the next two months, the vessel served as part of the siege flotilla in the Adriatic Sea. The presence of the flotilla was sufficient to keep the Austro-Hungarian Navy out of the conflict. At the end of the conflict, the warship was once more placed in reserve. In 1866, the vessel became a tender to the ship of the line Louis-XIV and acted as a gunnery school. The ship was rearmed with a battery of six 194 mm guns, while on the upper deck were mounted two 240 mm (9.4 in) smoothbore guns, three 164.7 mm (6.48 in) guns and a single 223.3 mm (8.79 in) muzzle-loading rifle converted into a shell-firing gun. Dévastation was struck on 9 May 1871 and transferred to Toulon to be broken up in 1872.

== Bibliography ==
- Caruana, J.; Koehler, R. B. (1996). "Question 7/95: French Ironclad Floating Batteries". Warship International. XXXIII (4). Toledo, Ohio: International Naval Research Organization: 416–418. ISSN 0043-0374.
- Gille, Eric (1999). Cent ans de cuirassés français [A Century of French Battleships] (in French). Nantes: Marines. ISBN 978-2-90967-550-3.
- Hamilton, C. I. (1993). Anglo-French Naval Rivalry, 1840–1870. Oxford: Clarendon Press. ISBN 978-0-19820-261-5.
- Martin, Frederick (1871). Martin, Frederick (ed.). The Statesman's Yearbook: The Politics, Cultures and Economies of the World. London: Macmillan and Co. ISBN 978-0-230-25300-1. OCLC 609404898.
- Ponting, Clive (2011). The Crimean War: The Truth Behind the Myth. London: Charro & Windus. ISBN 978-0-70117-390-6.
- Roberts, Stephen (2021). French Warships in the Age of Steam 1859–1914. Barnsley: Seaforth Publishing. ISBN 978-1-5267-4533-0.
- Roche, Jean-Michel (2005). Dictionnaire des bâtiments de la flotte de guerre française de Colbert à nos jours [Dictionary of French Warships from Colbert to Today] (in French). Vol. Tome I: 1671–1870. Toulon: Roche. ISBN 978-2-9525917-0-6. OCLC 165892922.
- Sondhaus, Lawrence (2004). Navies in Modern World History. London: Reaktion Books. ISBN 978-1-86189-202-7.
- Sondhaus, Lawrence (2012). Naval Warfare, 1815-1914. London: Taylor and Francis. ISBN 978-1-13460-994-9.
- Very, Edward W. (July 1883). "The Development of Armor for Naval Use". The Proceedings of the United States Naval Institute. IX (3): 349–583.
