= French ironclad floating battery Foudroyante =

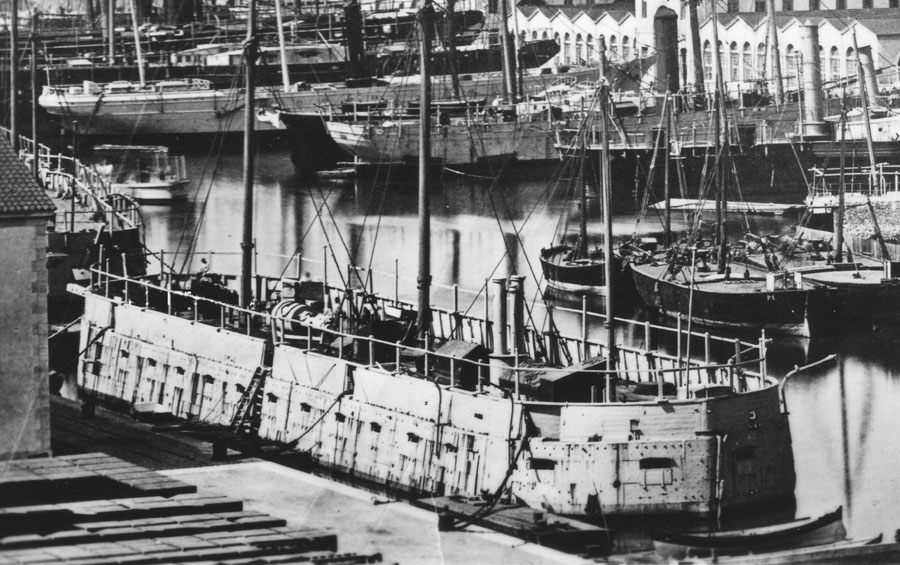
- Sister ship Lave

History

France
- Name: Foudroyante
- Ordered: 28 July 1854
- Builder: Arsenal de Lorient
- Laid down: 20 August 1854
- Launched: 2 June 1855
- Commissioned: 4 June 1855 (for trials)
- Stricken: 29 November 1871
- Fate: Scrapped, 1874

General characteristics (as built)
- Class & type: Dévastation-class ironclad floating battery
- Displacement: 1,604 t (1,579 long tons)
- Length: 53 m (173 ft 11 in)
- Beam: 13.55 m (44 ft 5 in)
- Draught: 2.8 m (9 ft 2 in)
- Installed power: 6 locomotive boilers; 430 ihp (320 kW)
- Propulsion: 1 propeller; 1 direct-acting steam engine
- Speed: 4 knots (7.4 km/h; 4.6 mph)
- Crew: 282
- Armament: 16 × single 194 mm (7.6 in) 50 pdr smoothbore guns; 2 × single 120 mm (4.7 in) 18 pdr smoothbore guns or; 2 × single 12 pdr carronades
- Armour: Waterline belt: 110 mm (4.3 in); Battery: 100 mm (3.9 in)

Foudroyant was a Dévastation-class ironclad floating battery built for the French Navy during the Crimean War. Completed in 1855, she was intended to serve in the Baltic Sea against the Russian Empire, but operations there ended before she could leave France. The ship was stricken from the navy list in 1871 and scrapped in 1874.

== Design and development ==
The Dévastation class consisted of five ironclad floating batteries designed during the Crimea War. The design was ordered by Emperor Napoleon III after the Battle of Sinope, informed by the experience of the French Navy from the conflict. They were designed with a shallow draft, allowing them to navigate close to shore and attack Russian coastal forts.

The ships had an overall length of 53 m (173 ft 11 in), a beam of 13.55 m (44 ft 5 in) and a draft of 2.8 m (9.2 ft). They displaced 1,604 metric tons (1,579 long tons). The Dévastation class was powered by a single two-cylinder high-pressure direct-acting steam engine that used steam provided by six locomotive boilers to drive the single propeller shaft. The engine was rated at 430 indicated horsepower (320 kW). To complement the engine, the ships were originally equipped with three masts with a total sail area of 350 m^{2} (3,800 sq ft), but these caused them to roll heavily and were replaced by lighter pole masts. The ships were designed to reach 6 knots (11 km/h; 6.9 mph), but could only attain between 3.2 knots (5.9 km/h; 3.7 mph) and 3.8 knots (7.0 km/h; 4.4 mph). The ships proved underpowered and frequently had to rely on other vessels to tow them to their station.

The Dévastations carried a main battery of sixteen 194 mm (7.6 in), 50-pounder smoothbore guns on the main deck. The upper deck housed two 138.7 mm (5.5 in) 18-pounder smoothbore guns or two 12 pounder carronades. The ships were protected by a full-length waterline belt of wrought iron that was 110 mm (4.3 in) thick. Protection for the gun battery was 100 mm (3.9 in) thick. Armored hatch covers protected the gun ports and the oak deck was covered with a sheet of iron. The ship's complement numbered 280 or 282 sailors of all ranks. An additional 40 marines could also be carried.
