= USS Sovereign (1855) =

Tender of the United States Navy

History

United States
- Name: USS Sovereign
- Launched: 1855
- Acquired: 9 January 1863
- In service: 1862
- Out of service: 1865
- Captured: 5 June 1862
- Fate: Sold, 29 November 1865

General characteristics
- Displacement: 336 tons
- Propulsion: steam engine; side wheel-propelled

The first USS Sovereign was a 336-ton steamer captured on the Mississippi River by the Union Navy during the beginning of the American Civil War.

The Navy placed Sovereign in service as a commissary ship, which is a ship's tender responsible for providing ships with provisions. Later in the war, she was used by the Navy as a barracks ship for ship workers.

== Service history ==
Sovereign—a side wheel steamer built in 1855 at Shousetown, Pennsylvania—operated on the Mississippi River and its tributaries during the years preceding the Civil War. She was acquired by the Confederacy in 1861 and served as a transport on the same river system. On 5 June 1862, on the Mississippi River near Island No. 37, she was fired upon by USS Benton and, as Union tugboat USS Spitfire closed for action, was abandoned by her crew. However, a 16-year-old lad who was loyal to the Union remained on board, removed weights from the steamer's safety valves, wetted down her fires, and signaled Spitfire with a white sheet. A prize crew from the Union tug then took possession of the ship.

Sovereign was condemned by the Illinois prize court and formally purchased by the Union Navy on 9 January 1863. Meanwhile, in the summer of 1862, she had been placed in service as a commissary boat for the Western Flotilla under the command of First Master Thomas Baldwin. She served for the most part off the mouth of the Yazoo River tending combatant ships during operations against Vicksburg, Mississippi. After the Confederate river fortress fell, she ascended the river to Cairo, Illinois, where she was laid up and used as quarters for workmen in the navy yard. Following the collapse of the Confederacy, Sovereign was sold at public auction at Cairo on 29 November 1865 to S. Homer.

== See also ==
- Anaconda Plan
- Mississippi Squadron
