= Dévastation-class ironclad floating battery =

French warships of the Crimean War and Franco-Austrian War

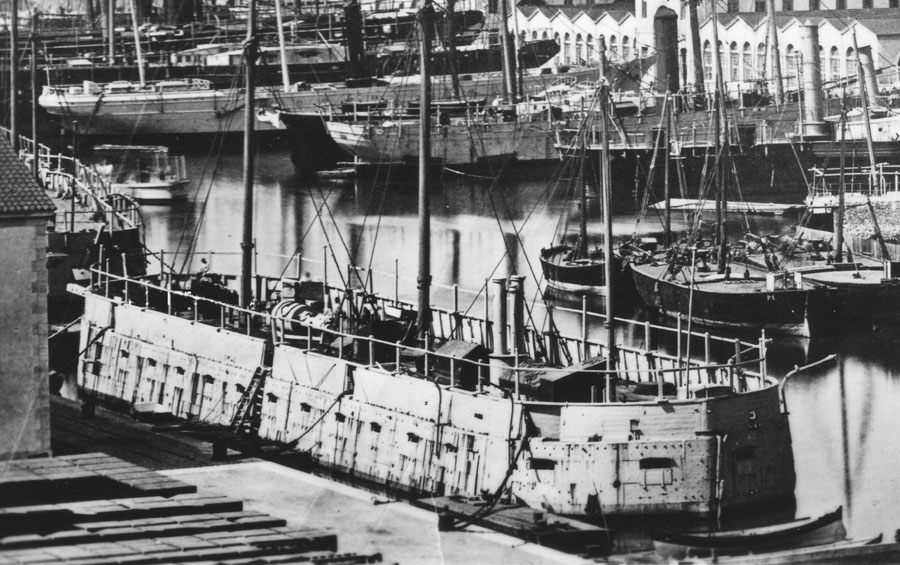
- Lave in 1854

Class overview
- Name: Dévastation class
- Operators: French Navy
- Preceded by: None
- Succeeded by: Palestro class
- Built: 1854–1855
- In service: 1855–1871
- Completed: 5
- Scrapped: 5

General characteristics
- Type: Ironclad floating battery
- Displacement: 1,604 t (1,579 long tons)
- Length: 53 m (173 ft 11 in)
- Beam: 13.55 m (44 ft 5 in)
- Draught: 2.8 m (9 ft 2 in)
- Installed power: 6 locomotive boilers; 430 ihp (320 kW)
- Propulsion: 1 propeller; 1 direct-acting steam engine
- Speed: 3.2–3.8 knots (5.9–7.0 km/h; 3.7–4.4 mph)
- Crew: 282
- Armament: 16 × single 194 mm (7.6 in) 50 pdr smoothbore guns; 2 × single 120 mm (4.7 in) 18 pdr smoothbore guns or; 2 × single 12 pdr carronades
- Armour: Waterline belt: 110 mm (4.3 in); Battery: 100 mm (3.9 in)

The Dévastation-class ironclad floating batteries were built for the attack of Russian coastal fortifications during the Crimean War. France intended to build ten of these vessels, but in the time available was only able to construct five in French shipyards, of which the first three took part in the attack on Kinburn in 1855, and served in the Adriatic in June–July 1859 during the Italian war. All five were stricken from the navy list between 1867 and 1875 and subsequently scrapped.

== Design and development ==
Design work on the ironclad floating batteries was ordered by Emperor Napoleon III after the Battle of Sinope in 1853, informed by the experience of the French Navy from the conflict. They were designed with a shallow draft so that they could attack Russian coastal forts.

The ships had an overall length of 53 m (173 ft 11 in), a beam of 13.55 m (44 ft 5 in) and a draft of 2.8 m (9.2 ft). They displaced 1,600–1,674 metric tons (1,575–1,648 long tons). The Dévastation class was powered by a single two-cylinder direct-acting steam engine that used steam provided by six locomotive boilers to drive the single 1.8-meter (5 ft 11 in) propeller. The boilers had an operating pressure between 4 and 5 standard atmospheres (4.1 and 5.2 kg/cm^{2}; 58.8 and 73.5 psi). The engine's cylinders had a bore and stroke of 0.6 meters (2 ft) and the engine was rated at 430 indicated horsepower (320 kW). To complement the engine, the ships were originally equipped with three masts with a total sail area of 350 m^{2} (3,800 sq ft), but these caused them to roll heavily and were replaced by lighter pole masts. The ships were designed to reach 6 knots (11 km/h; 6.9 mph), but could only attain between 3.2 knots (5.9 km/h; 3.7 mph) and 3.8 knots (7.0 km/h; 4.4 mph). The ships proved underpowered and frequently had to rely on other vessels to tow them to their station.

The Dévastations carried a main battery of sixteen 194 mm (7.6 in), 50-pounder smoothbore guns on the main deck. The upper deck housed two 138.7 mm (5.5 in) 18-pounder smoothbore guns or two 12 pounder carronades. The ships were protected by a full-length waterline belt of wrought iron that was 110 mm (4.3 in) thick. Protection for the gun battery was 100 mm (3.9 in) thick. Armored hatch covers protected the gun ports and the oak deck was covered with a sheet of iron. The ship's complement numbered 280 or 282 sailors of all ranks. An additional 40 marines could also be carried.

== Operational history ==
- Dévastation left Cherbourg for the Black Sea towed by the paddle-frigate l'Albatros on 10 August 1855. On 17 October 1855 she took part in the bombardment of the Russian fortress at Kinburn, firing 1,265 projectiles (including 82 shells) in four hours, and sustained 72 hits (including 31 on the armour), resulting in 2 of the crew being killed and 12 wounded. In June and July 1859 she was part of the siege flotilla in the Adriatic during the Italian war. In 1866 she became a gunnery school as a tender to Louis-XIV at Toulon.
- Tonnante was armed at Rochefort on 2 June 1855. She left Brest for the Black Sea towed by the paddle-frigate Darien. On 17 October 1855 she took part in the bombardment of the Russian fortress at Kinburn, firing 1,012 projectiles in four hours, and sustained 66 hits on her armour, and nine of her crew were wounded. She spent the winter of 1855–1856 iced in on the Dnieper. She was rearmed on 5 June 1856 and commissioned at Brest on 5 July 1856. She went into reserve at Brest on 18 September 1857. She was recommissioned at Brest on 3 June 1859, and in June and July 1859 she was part of the siege flotilla in the Adriatic during the Italian war. She went into reserve on 6 March 1860.
- Lave was armed at Lorient on 18 May 1855, and left Lorient for the Black Sea towed by the paddle-frigate Magellan. On 17 October 1855 she took part in the bombardment of the Russian fortress at Kinburn, firing 900 projectiles in four hours, and received no injuries. She was disarmed at Toulon on 10 July 1856. She was rearmed at Toulon on 22 April 1859, and in June and July 1859 she was part of the siege flotilla in the Adriatic during the Italian war. She was disarmed again at Toulon on 1 September 1859. She was rearmed on 26 October 1867 and disarmed 3 December 1867 at Toulon. She was again rearmed on 1 September 1870, until she was disarmed at Toulon on 1 April 1871.
- Foudroyante was ordered to the Baltic in 1856, but the peace intervened, so she remained at Cherbourg. She was armed on 10 June 1859, and disarmed in 1865–1867.
- Congrève was armed for war in 1855, and the navy planned to send Congrève to the Baltic, but she did not go. She was in reserve in 1861–1865, and disarmed in 1866.

Congrève was retired in 1867 and the other four in 1871.

== Ships in class ==
Name	Built at	Laid down	Launched	In service date	Retired	Scrapped	Source
Dévastation	Cherbourg	5 September 1854	17 April 1855	10 August 1855	9 May 1871	1872, Toulon	
Tonnante	Brest	5 September 1854	17 March 1855	30 July 1855	31 August 1871	1873-4, Toulon	
Lave	Lorient	20 August 1854	26 May 1855	6 August 1855	9 May 1871	1873, Toulon	
Foudroyante	Lorient	20 August 1854	2 June 1855	10 June 1859	29 November 1871	1874, Cherbourg	
Congrève	Rochefort	4 September 1854	1 June 1855	Never commissioned	13 May 1867	1868, Brest	

Dévastation's armour consisted of 183 plates of 110 mm (4.3 in) thick wrought iron made by Creusot Rive-de-Gier, which weighed in total 297.5 metric tons (292.8 long tons). She cost 1,146,489 Francs.

== Bibliography ==
- de Balincourt, Captain; Vincent-Bréchignac, Captain (1973). "French Floating Batteries". F.P.D.S. Newsletter. I (2): 13–20. OCLC 41554533.
- Baxter, James Phinney (1933). The Introduction of the Ironclad Battleship. Cambridge, Massachusetts: Harvard University Press.
- Caruana, J.; Koehler, R. B. (1996). "Question 7/95: French Ironclad Floating Batteries". Warship International. XXXIII (4): 416–18. ISSN 0043-0374.
- Gille, Eric (1999). Cent ans de cuirassés français [A Century of French Battleships] (in French). Nantes: Marines. ISBN 2-909-675-50-5.0
- Roberts, Stephen S. (2021). French Warships in the Age of Steam 1859–1914: Design, Construction, Careers and Fates. Barnsley, UK: Seaforth Publishing. ISBN 978-1-5267-4533-0.
- Roche, Jean-Michel (2005). Dictionnaire des bâtiments de la flotte de guerre française de Colbert à nos jours 1, 1671 - 1870 (in French). Toulon: Roche. ISBN 978-2-9525917-0-6. OCLC 165892922.
- Sondhaus, Lawrence (2004). Navies in Modern World History. London: Reaktion Books. ISBN 978-1-86189-202-7.
