= Battle of Kinburn (1855) =

Anglo-French victory in the Crimean War

Coordinates: 46.6023°N 31.4978°E

- Part of the Crimean War
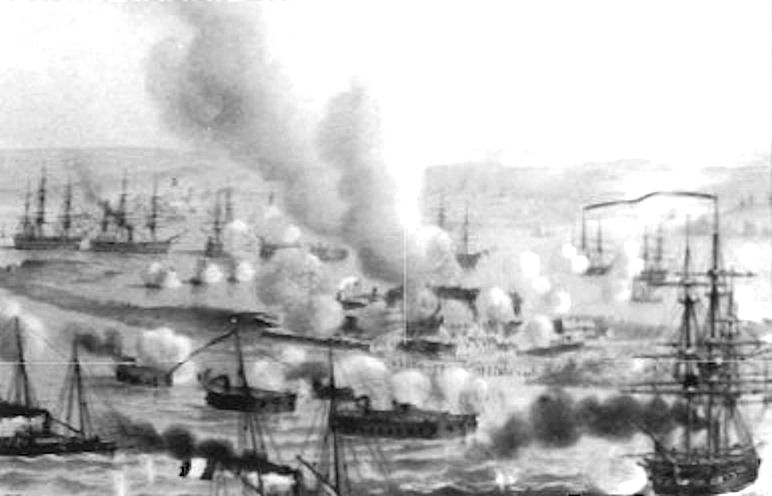
- Illustration of the ironclad batteries bombarding Kinburn
Date	17 October 1855
Location	Kinburn Spit, modern-day Ukraine
Result	Anglo-French victory

Belligerents
(Second French Empire) French Empire; United Kingdom	(Russia) Russian Empire

Commanders and leaders
(Second French Empire) Armand Joseph Bruat (United Kingdom) Edmund Lyons	(Russia) Maxim Kokhanovitch

Strength
10 ships of the line 3 ironclad batteries 8,000 soldiers	1,500 soldiers 80 guns

Casualties and losses
2 killed 25 wounded	c. 400

The Battle of Kinburn, a combined land-naval engagement during the final stage of the Crimean War, took place on the tip of the Kinburn Peninsula (on the south shore of the Dnieper–Bug estuary in what is now Ukraine) on 17 October 1855. During the battle a combined fleet of vessels from the French Navy and the British Royal Navy bombarded Russian coastal fortifications after an Anglo-French ground force had besieged them. Three French ironclad batteries carried out the main attack, which saw the main Russian fortress destroyed in an action that lasted about three hours.

The battle, although strategically insignificant with little effect on the outcome of the war, is notable for the first use of modern ironclad warships in action. Although frequently hit, the French ships destroyed the Russian forts within three hours, suffering minimal casualties in the process. This battle convinced contemporary navies to design and build new major warships with armour plating; this instigated a naval arms race between France and Britain lasting over a decade.

== Background ==
In September 1854, the Anglo-French army that had been at Varna was ferried across the Black Sea and landed on the Crimean Peninsula. They then fought their way to the main Russian naval base on the peninsula, the city of Sevastopol, which they placed under siege. The Russian garrison eventually withdrew from the city in early September 1855, freeing the French and British fleets for other tasks. A discussion ensued over what target should be attacked next; the French and British high commands considered driving from the Crimea to Kherson and launching major campaigns in Bessarabia or the Caucasus. Instead, at the urging of French commanders, they settled on a smaller-scale operation to seize the Russian fort at Kinburn, which protected the mouth of the Dnieper. The British argued that to seize Kinburn without advancing to Nikolaev would only serve to warn the Russians of the threat to the port. Fox Maule-Ramsay, then the British Secretary of State for War, suggested that without a plan to exploit the capture of the fortress, the only purpose of the operation would be to give the fleets something to do.

=== Forces involved ===
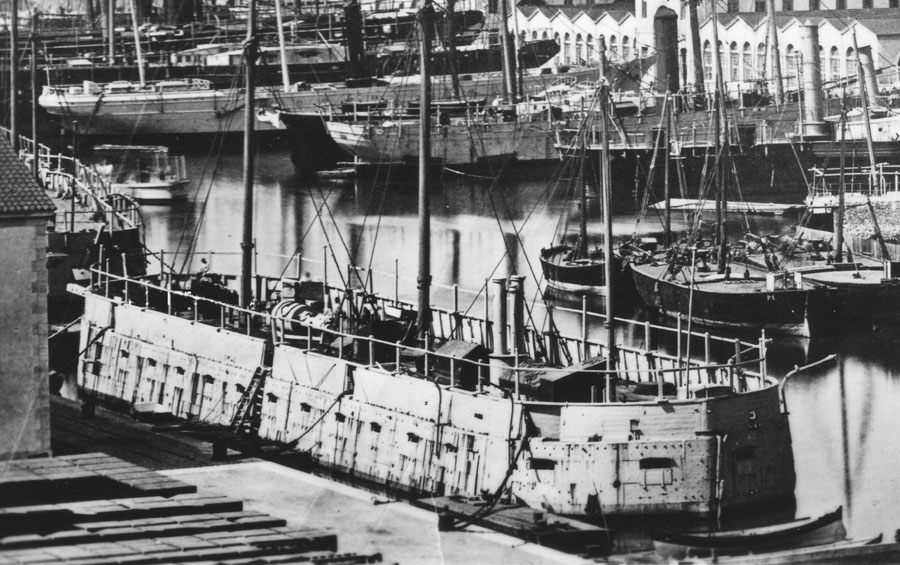
The Dévastation-class ironclad battery Lave, c. 1855

The fortress was located on the Kinburn Spit, at the extreme western end of the Kinburn Peninsula, and consisted of three separate fortifications. The primary fort, built of stone, square, and equipped with bastions, held 50 guns, some of which were mounted in protective casemates; the rest were in en barbette mountings, firing over the parapets. Two smaller fortresses were located further down the spit, mounting ten and eleven guns, respectively. The first was a small stone fort, while the second was a simple sand earthwork. The forts were armed only with medium and smaller calibre guns, the largest guns being 24-pounders. Major General Maxim Kokhanovitch commanded the garrison of 1,500 men, most of whom were stationed in the main fort. Across the estuary was Fort Nikolaev in the town of Ochakov with fifteen more guns, but these were too far away to play a role in the battle.

To attack the forts, the British and French assembled a fleet centred on four French and six British ships of the line, led by British Rear Admiral Edmund Lyons and the French Vice Admiral Armand Joseph Bruat. The British contributed a further seventeen frigates and sloops, ten gunboats, and six bomb vessels, along with ten transport vessels. The French squadron included three corvettes, four avisos, twelve gunboats, and five bomb vessels. The transports carried a force of 8,000 men from French and British Army regiments that would be used to besiege the forts.

In addition to the contingent of conventional sailing warships, the French squadron brought three experimental ironclad warships that had recently arrived from France. These, the first three ironclad batteries of the Dévastation class—Lave, Dévastation, and Tonnante—had been sent to the Black Sea in late July, but they arrived too late to take part in the siege of Sevastopol. These vessels, the first ironclad warships, carried eighteen 50-pounder guns and were protected with 4 inches (100 mm) of wrought iron armour. Observers speculated that these untested warships would be ineffective in combat, owing to their slow speed and poor handling.

== Battle ==
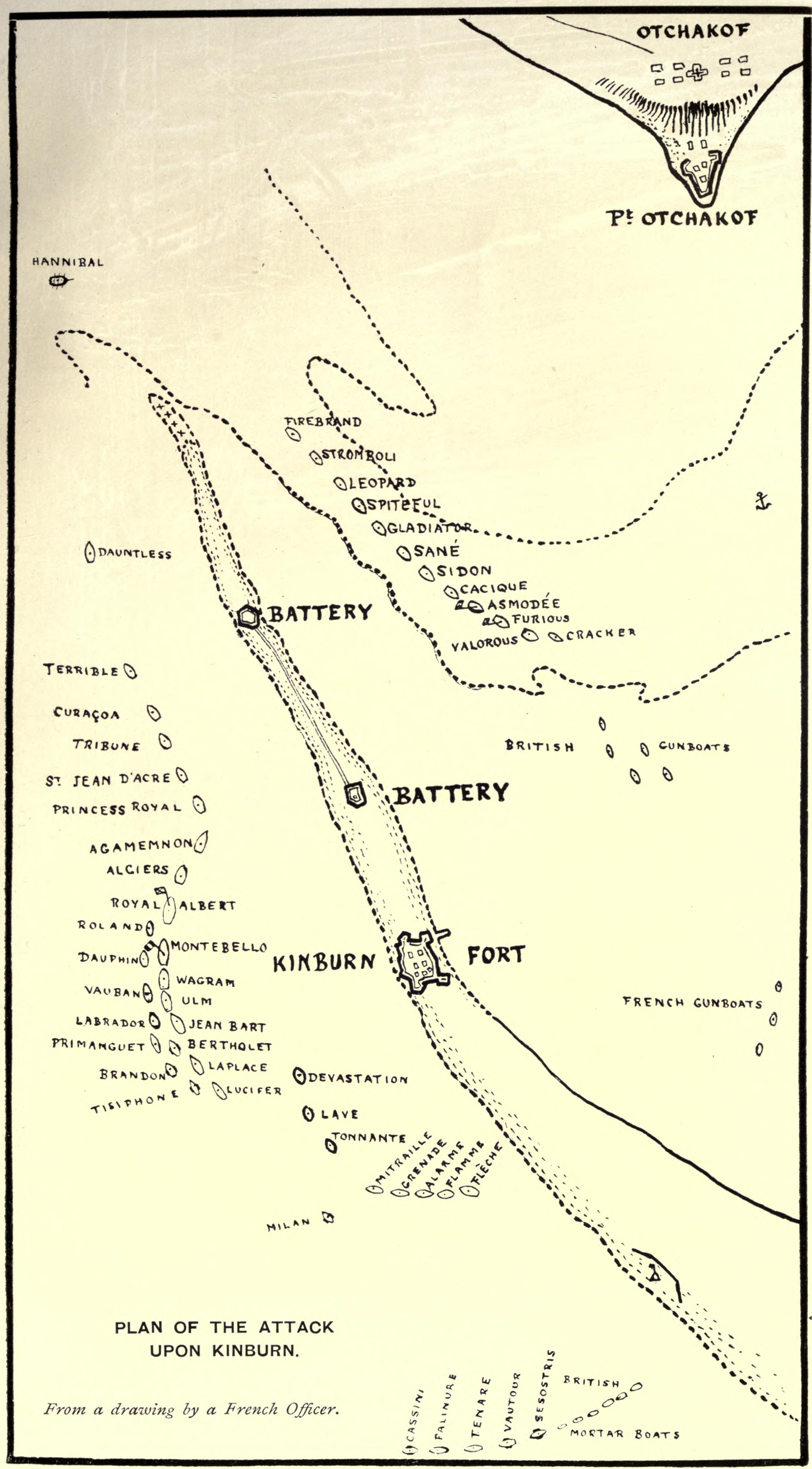
Map showing the arrangement of the fleet and the fortifications during the battle

In an effort to confuse the Russians, the combined fleet made a feint westward toward Odessa on 8 October before turning east to Kinburn. The combined French and British fleet arrived off Kinburn on 14 October. That night, a force of nine gunboats escorted transports carrying 8,000 men, led by François Achille Bazaine, who were landed behind the forts, further up the peninsula. The gunboat force was commanded by Rear Admiral Houston Stewart, who ordered his crews to hold their fire in the darkness unless they were able to clearly see a Russian target. The Russians did not launch a counterattack on the landing, allowing the French and British soldiers to dig trench positions while the gunboats shelled the main fort, albeit ineffectively. By the morning of the 17th, the soldiers had completed significant entrenchments, with French troops facing the fortifications and British troops manning the outward defences against a possible Russian attempt to relieve the garrison. By this time, the French had begun building sapping trenches, which then came under fire from the Russian fortress. In the meantime, on the night of the 16th, a French vessel had taken depth soundings close to the main fort to determine how closely the ships could approach it. Throughout this time, heavy seas prevented the fleet from launching a sustained bombardment of the Russian positions.

At around 9:00 on 17 October, the Anglo-French fleet moved into position to begin their bombardment. The ships of the line had a difficult time getting into effective positions owing to the shoals in the surrounding water, and so much of the work fell to smaller and shallower draught vessels, most prominently the three ironclad batteries. The floating batteries were anchored just 600 yards (550 m) from the Russian fortress, where they proved to be immune to Russian artillery fire, which either bounced off or exploded harmlessly on their wrought iron armour plating. The French and British ships of the line were anchored further out, at around 1,200 yards (1,100 m), while the bomb vessels were placed further still, at 2,800 yards (2,600 m). While their guns battered at the fortifications, the ironclads each had a contingent of Royal Marines who inflicted significant casualties on the Russian gun crews. The only significant hit on the ironclad batteries was one shell that entered a gunport on Dévastation, which killed two men but otherwise caused no serious damage to the ship.

The cannonade started fires in the main fortress and rapidly disabled Russian guns. Once Russian fire started to decrease, the gunboats moved into position behind the fortresses and began to bombard them as well. In the course of the morning, the three French vessels fired some 3,000 shells into the fort, and by 12:00, it had been neutralized by the combined firepower of the Anglo-French fleet. A single Russian hoisted a white flag above the fort to indicate their surrender, and Kokhanovitch walked out to speak with the French ground commander. According to historian James Grant, around 1,100 Russians of the 1,500-man garrison survived the battle and were allowed to leave without their weapons. Herbert Wilson puts the Russian casualties much lower, at 45 dead and 130 wounded. For the French and British, the only men killed were the two aboard Dévastation, with a further 25 wounded, all of whom were aboard the floating batteries. In the course of the battle, Dévastation was hit 75 times, while Lave received 66 hits and Tonnante was hit around the same number of times. None of the ships emerged from the battle with more than minor dents in their armour plate.

== Aftermath ==
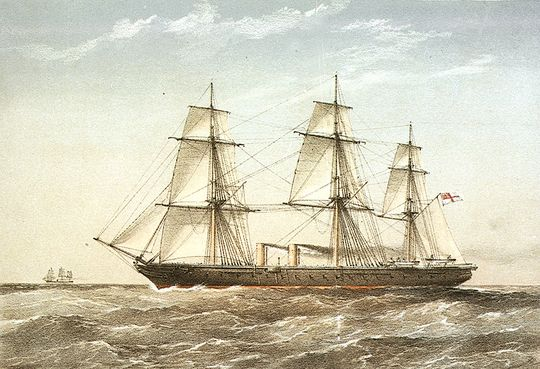
HMS Warrior, the first British sea-going ironclad warship

On 20 October, Bazaine's infantry conducted reconnaissance toward Kherson and met no organized resistance before withdrawing. After they returned to Kinburn, the French and British commanders determined that the fort could be rebuilt and held through the upcoming winter. A force of 1,700 men was left behind to garrison the position, along with the three ironclad batteries. The rest of the force returned to the Crimea. Though the British had initially considered continuing up the Dnieper to capture Nikolaev, it became clear after the seizure of Kinburn that to do so would require much larger numbers of soldiers to clear the cliffs that dominated the river than had been originally estimated. The British planned to eventually launch an offensive to take Nikolaev in 1856, but the war ended before it could be begun.

Since they lacked the forces to take Nikolaev in a single campaign, the seizure of Kinburn proved to have limited strategic effect. Nevertheless, the attack on Kinburn was significant in that it demonstrated that the French and British fleets had developed effective amphibious capabilities and had technological advantages that gave them a decisive edge over their Russian opponents. The destruction of Kinburn's coastal fortifications completed the Anglo-French naval campaign in the Black Sea; the Russians no longer had any meaningful forces left to oppose them at sea. The British and French navies planned to transfer forces to the Baltic Sea the following year to strengthen operations there. Diplomatic pressure from still-neutral Austria convinced Czar Alexander II of Russia to sue for peace, which was concluded the following February with the Treaty of Paris.

In his report, Bruat informed his superiors that "[e]verything may be expected from these formidable engines of war." The effectiveness of the ironclad batteries in neutralizing the Russian guns, though still debated by naval historians, nevertheless convinced French Emperor Napoleon III to order more ironclad warships. Their success at Kinburn, coupled with the devastating effect new shell-firing guns had had on wooden warships at the Battle of Sinop earlier in the war led most French naval officers to support the new armoured vessels. Napoleon III's programme produced the first sea-going ironclad, Gloire, initiating a naval construction race between France and Britain that would last until the outbreak of the Franco-Prussian War in 1870. The British Royal Navy, which had five ironclad batteries under construction, laid down another four after the victory at Kinburn, and replied to Gloire with a pair of armoured frigates of their own, Warrior and Black Prince. France built a further eleven batteries built to three different designs, and the Russian Navy built fifteen armoured rafts for harbour defence.

== See also ==
- Battle of Kinburn (1787)
