= Floating battery =

Type of heavily armed watercraft

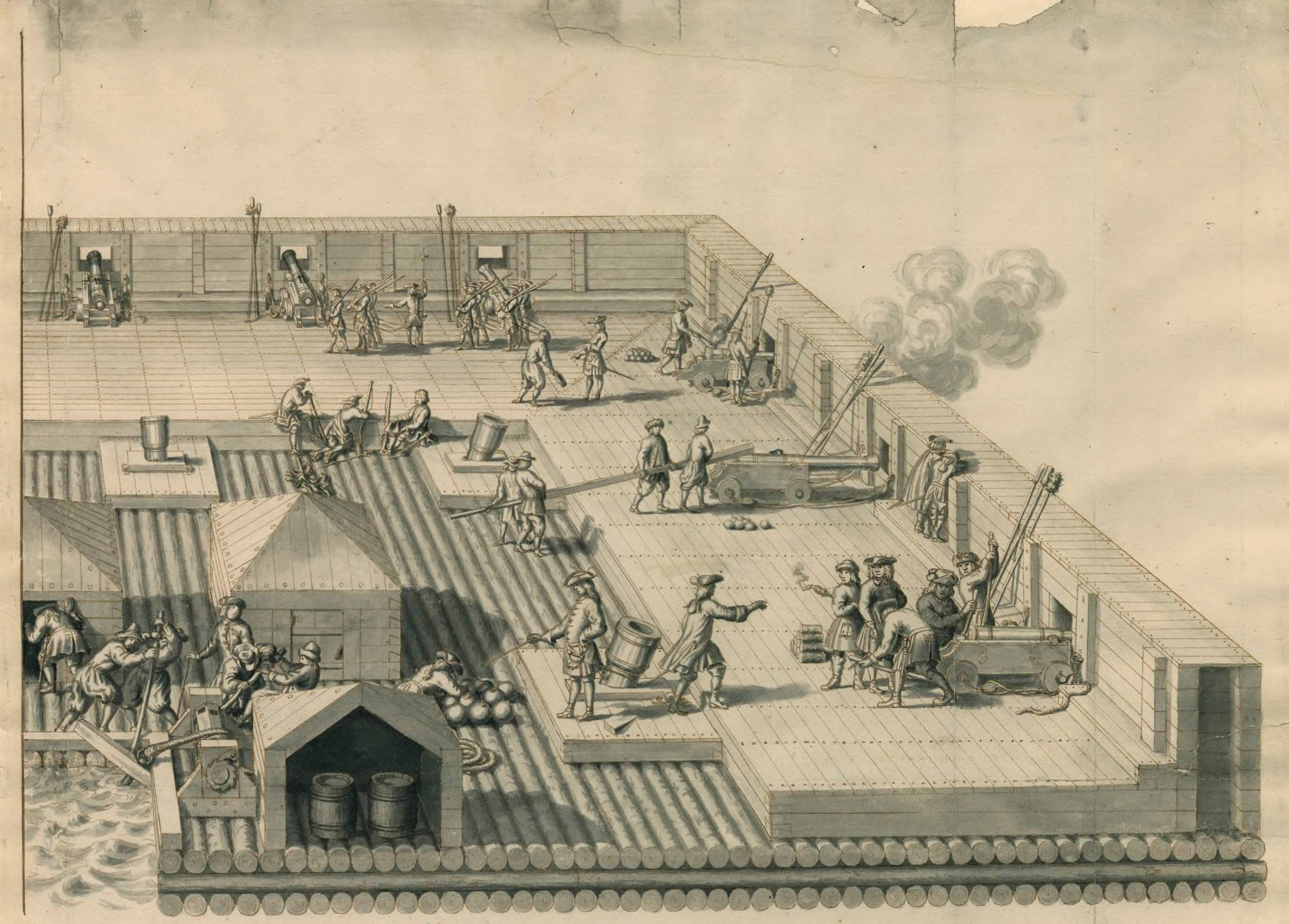
Wash drawing of a floating artillery battery from the 18th century

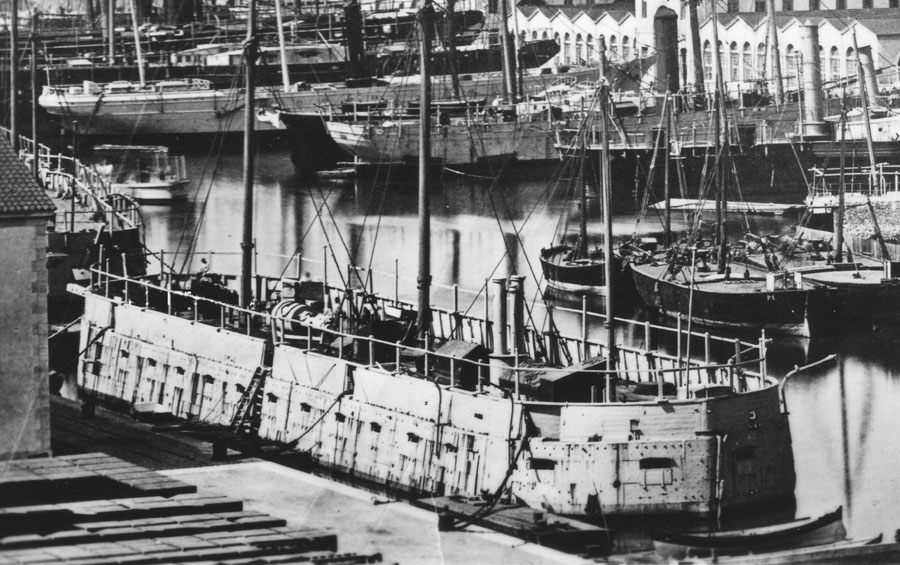
French Navy ironclad floating battery Lave, 1854. This ironclad, together with the similar Tonnante and Dévastation, vanquished Russian land batteries at the Battle of Kinburn (1855).

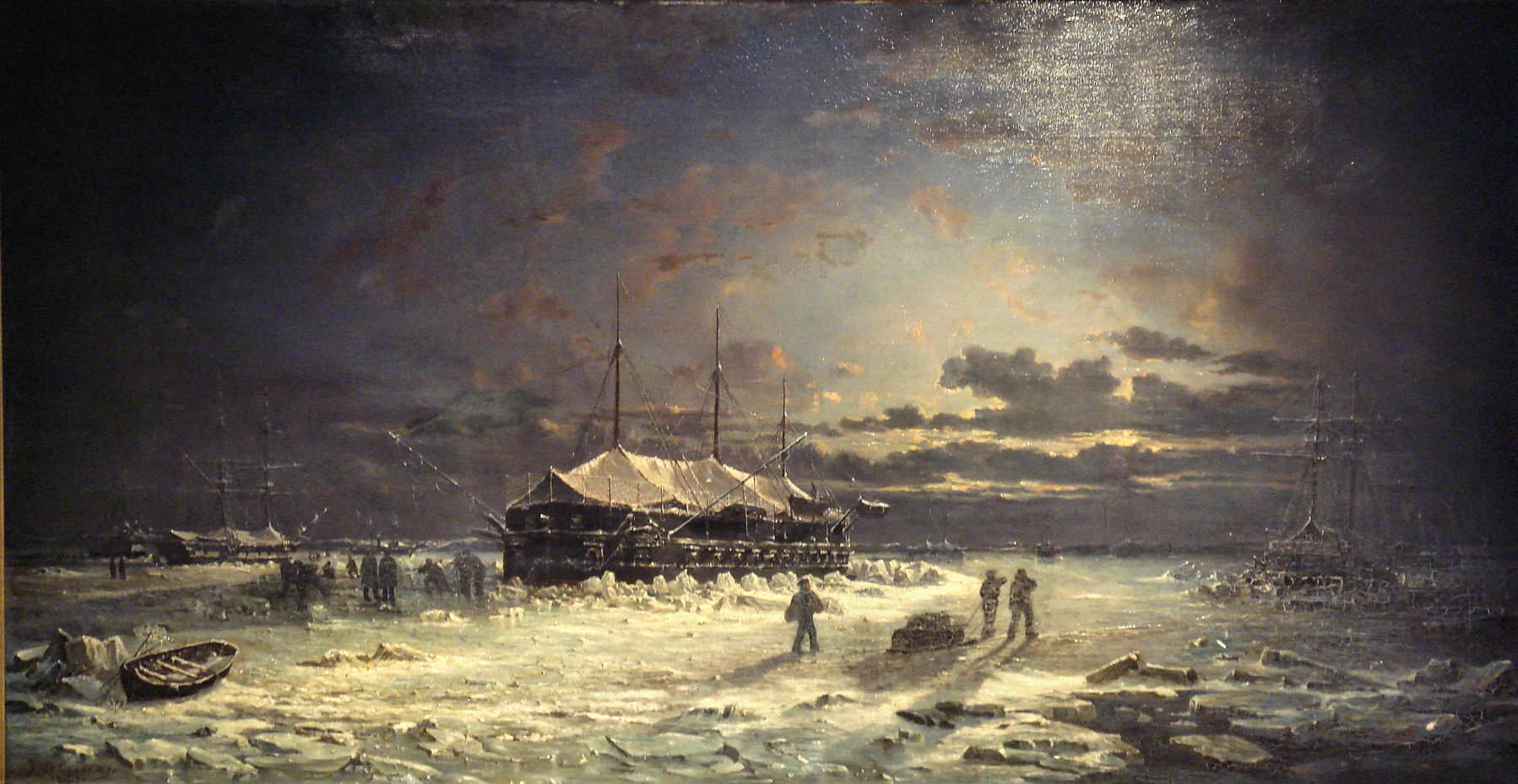
Ironclad floating battery of the Dévastation class, spending the winter of 1855–1856 in the Crimea

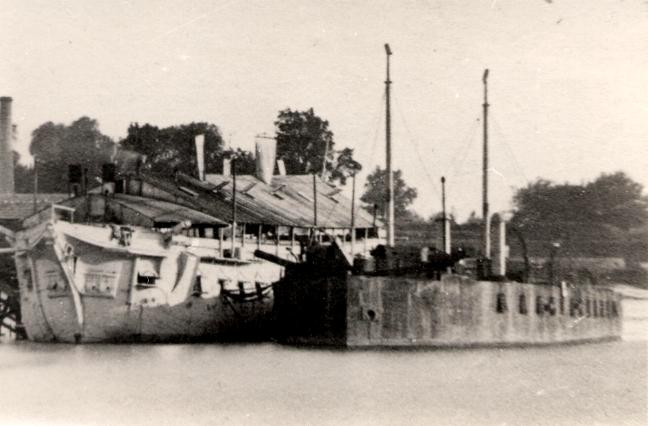
The floating battery Paixhans (1862), designed for war in Cochinchina

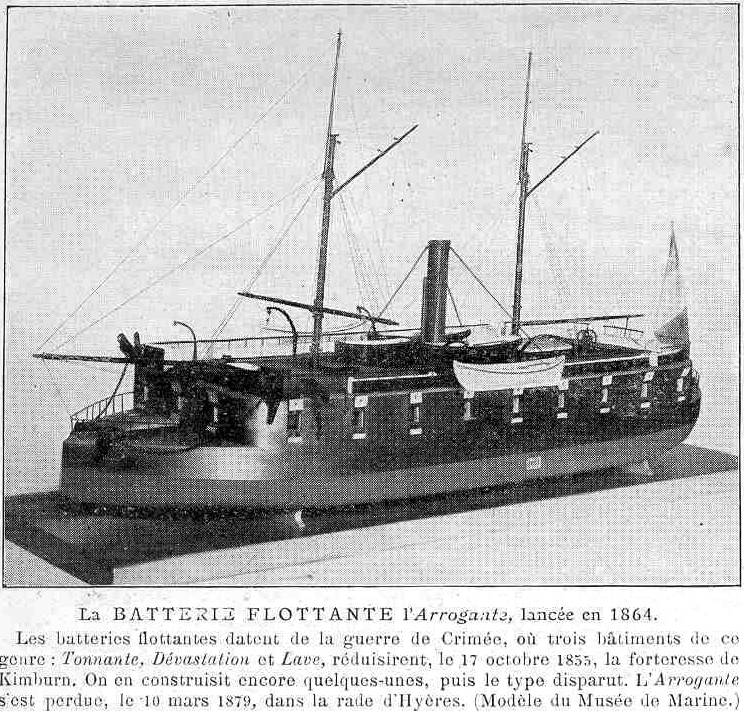
French armoured floating battery Arrogante (1864)

A floating battery is a kind of armed watercraft, often improvised or experimental, which carries heavy armament but has few other qualities as a warship.

== History ==
During the capture of Mahdia in 1550, Spanish captain Garcia de Toledo Osorio built a floating battery to bombard the city. The fortified, nine-gun battery was built over two galleys and became decisive to take the position. It was designed by Sicilian engineer Andronico de Espinosa and built over galleys owned by Toledo and admiral Andrea Doria.

Use of timber rafts loaded with cannon by Danish defenders of Copenhagen against bomb ketches of a combined British-Dutch-Swedish fleet is attested by Nathaniel Uring in 1700.

In 1727, Spanish engineer Juan de Ochoa proposed King Philip V his project of the barcaza-espín ("barge-porcupine"), heavily armored floating batteries moved by rows and fitted with multiple rams. The end of the Anglo-Spanish War, however, buried the project before it could be implemented.

An early appearance was in 1782 at the Great Siege of Gibraltar, and its invention and usage is attributed to French engineer Jean Le Michaud d'Arçon.

A purpose-built floating battery was Flådebatteri No. 1, designed by Chief Engineer Henrik Gerner in 1787; it was 47 m (154 ft) long, 13 m (43 ft) wide and armed with 24 guns, and was used during the 1801 Battle of Copenhagen under the command of Peter Willemoes. The British made limited use of floating batteries during the French Revolutionary and Napoleonic Wars, with the two-vessel Musquito and Firm-class floating batteries, and some individual vessels such as HMS Redoubt.

The most notable floating batteries were built or designed in the 19th century, and are related to the development of the first steam warship and the ironclad warship.

Demologos, the first steam-propelled warship, was a floating battery designed for the protection of New York Harbor in the War of 1812.

In the 1850s, the British and French navies deployed iron-armoured floating batteries as a supplement to the wooden steam battlefleet in the Crimean War. The role of the battery was to assist unarmoured mortar and gunboats bombarding shore fortifications. The French used their batteries in 1855 against the defenses at Kinburn on the Black Sea, where they were effective against Russian shore defences. The British planned to use theirs in the Baltic Sea against Kronstadt, and may have been influential in causing the Russians to sue for peace. However, Kronstadt was widely regarded as the most heavily fortified naval arsenal in the world throughout most of the 19th-century, continually upgrading its combined defences to meet new changes in technology. Even as the British armoured-batteries were readied against Kronstadt in early 1856, the Russians had already constructed newer networks of outlying forts, mortar batteries of their own, and submarine mines against which the British had no system for removing under fire.

Traditional floating battery called kotta mara was used by the Banjar and Dayak against the Dutch during the Banjar war (1859–1906). The battery is made by adding walls (sloped and unsloped) to a raft made by large logs. Some of them shaped like a castle and had bastions with 4 cannons on each bastion. The kotta mara could resist the Dutch 30-pounder cannons until 24.5 m range, the range which the cannon could effectively penetrate it.

Floating batteries were popularly implemented by both the Union and the Confederacy during the American Civil War. The first was the Confederate Floating Battery of Charleston Harbor, which took an active part in the bombardment of Fort Sumter in April 1861. Experimental ironclad vessels that proved too cumbersome or were underpowered were often converted into floating batteries and posted for river and coastal waterway control. Here too, Civil War batteries and even ironclads such as the famed monitors, were acutely vulnerable to mines protected in turn by forts. As a result, the combined defences of Charleston, South Carolina, for example, were never overwhelmed by the Union Navy.

== See also ==
- United States floating battery Demologos
- Arsenal ship
- Rhino ferry

== Bibliography ==
- Sieche, Erwin (1984). "Question 50/81". Warship International. XXI (3): 324–326. ISSN 0043-0374.
- Smith, Warren & Sturton, Ian (2010). "Question 15/46: French 1859 Armored River Gunboats". Warship International. XLVII (2): 103–104. ISSN 0043-0374.
- van Dijk, Anthonie (1988). "The Mysterious Floating Batteries of the Royal Netherlands Navy". Warship International. XXV (3): 229–238. ISSN 0043-0374.
