= List of ironclad warships of France =

France built a series of ironclad warships between the 1850s and 1890s; these began with the Dévastation-class ironclad floating batteries built during the Crimean War, which presaged Gloire, the first sea-going ironclad to be built by any navy.

== Broadside ironclads ==
- Gloire class 5,603 tons.
  - Gloire (1859) – world's first ocean-going ironclad, stricken 1879.
  - Invincible (1861) – stricken 1872.
  - Normandie (1860) – stricken 1871.
- Couronne (1861) 5,983 tons – hulked 1910.
- Magenta class 6,715 tons.
  - Magenta (1861) – sank after internal explosion 1875.
  - Solférino (1861) – stricken 1882.
- Provence class 5,700 – 6,122 tons.
  - Provence (1863) – stricken 1884.
  - Héroïne (1863) – hulked 1894.
  - Flandre (1864) – stricken 1886.
  - Savoie (1863) – stricken 1888.
  - Magnanime (1864) – stricken 1882.
  - Surveillante (1864) – stricken 1890.
  - Valeureuse (1864) – stricken 1886.
  - Gauloise (1865) – stricken 1883.
  - Revanche (1865) – BU (broken up) 1893.
  - Guyenne (1865) – stricken 1882.
- Belliqueuse (French: Belliqueuse) (1865) 3,717 tons – expended as a target 1886.
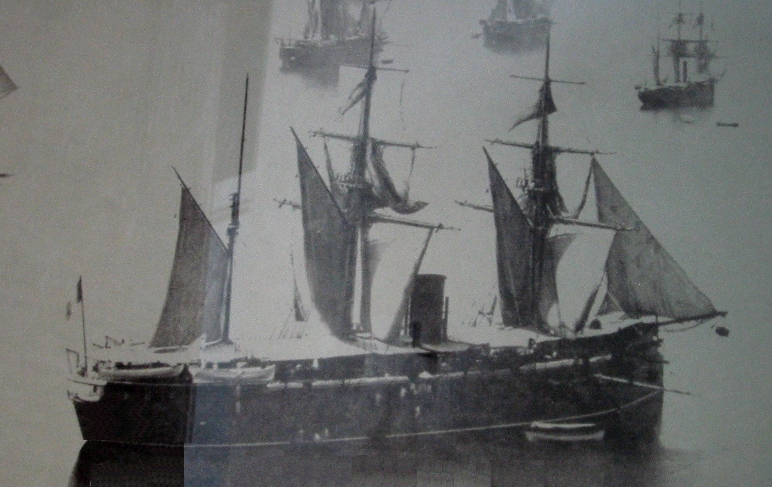
Gloire

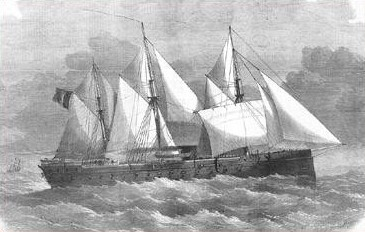
La Gloire

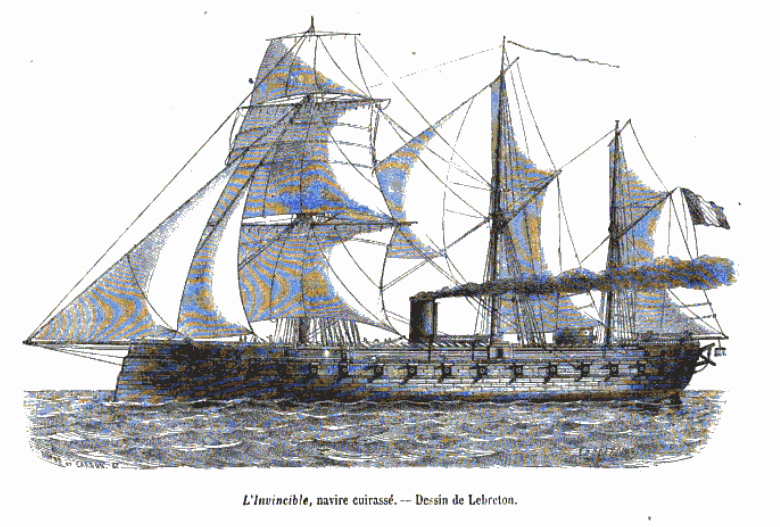
Invincible in 1860

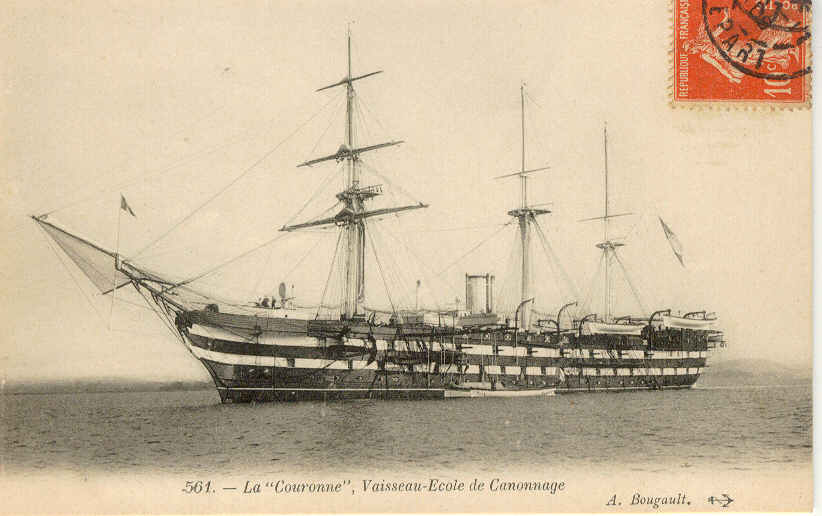
Couronne in 1861

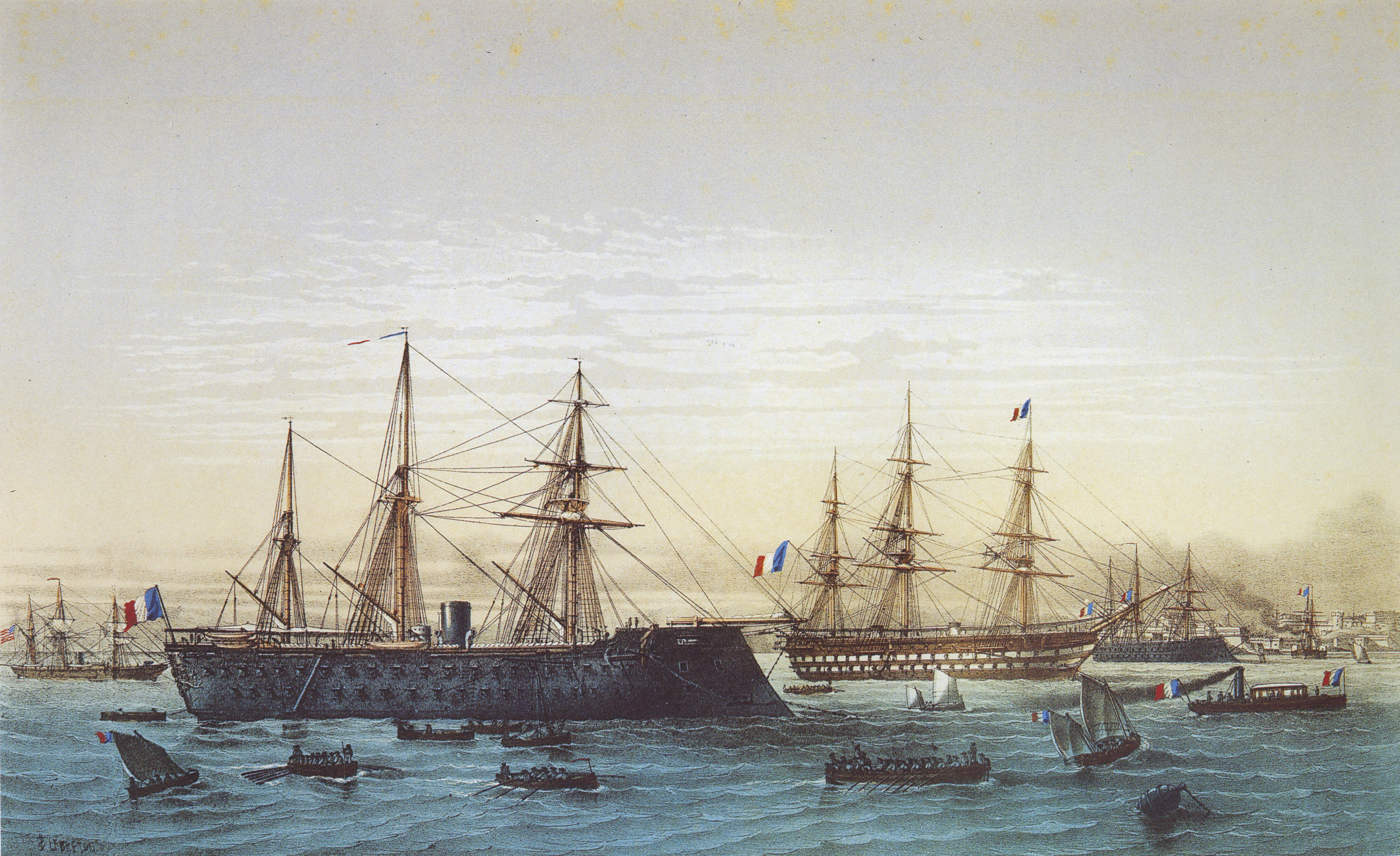
Magenta and Napoléon III

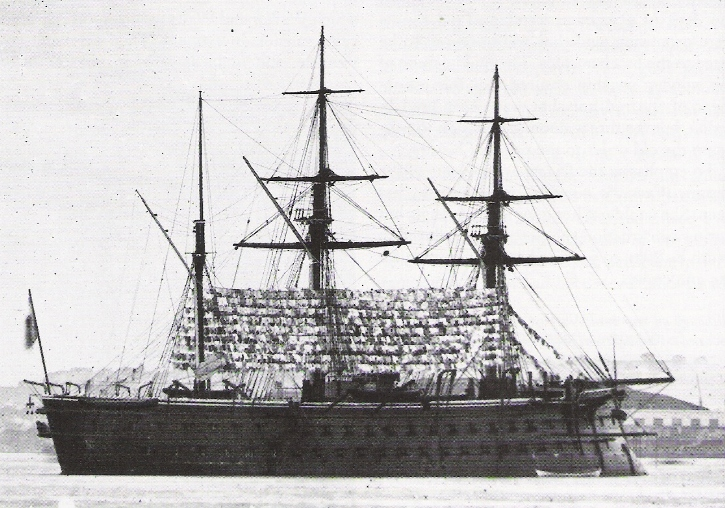
Solférino in 1861

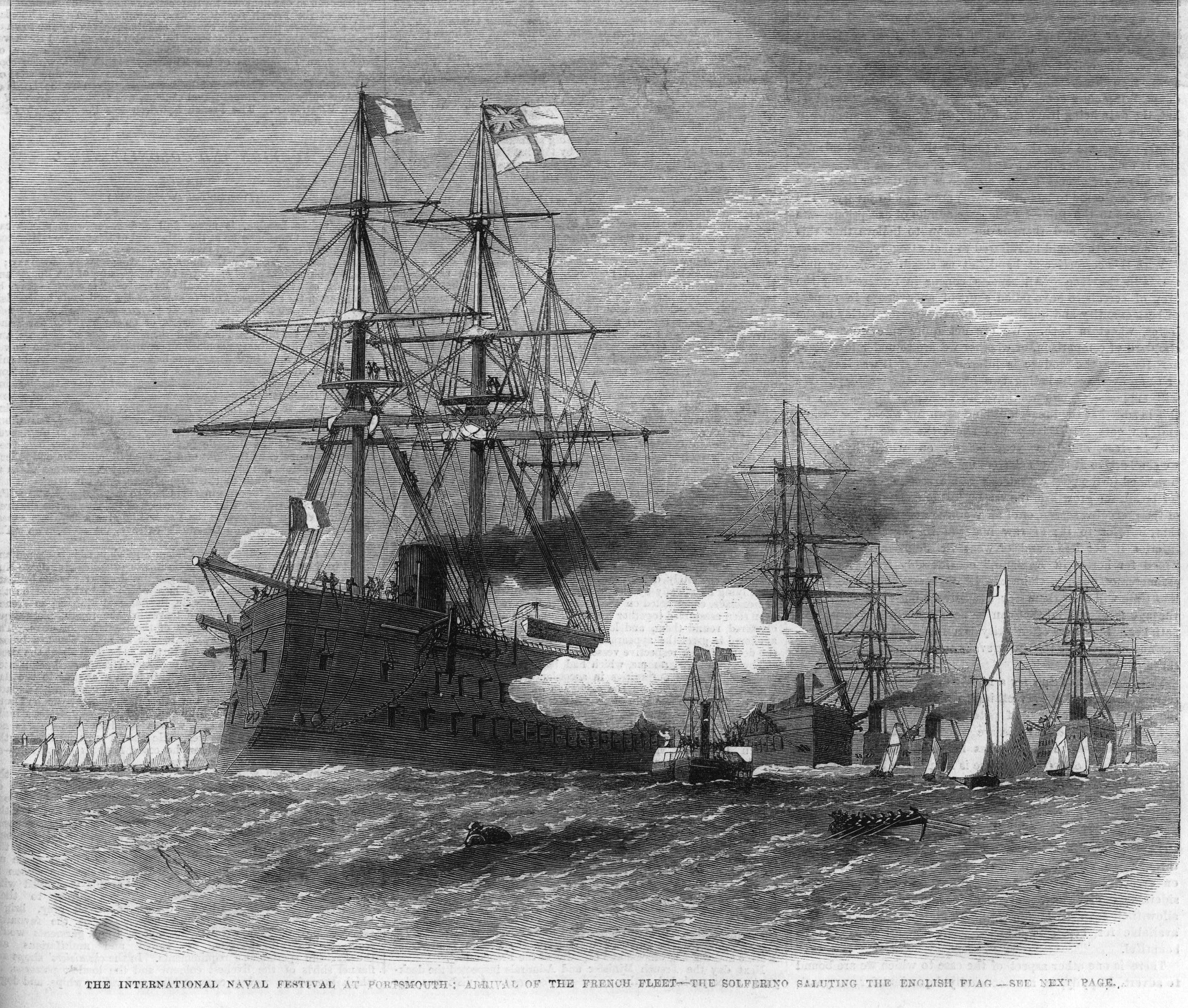
Solférino

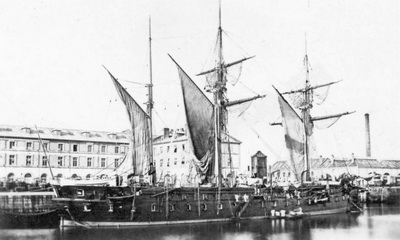
Guyenne class in 1865

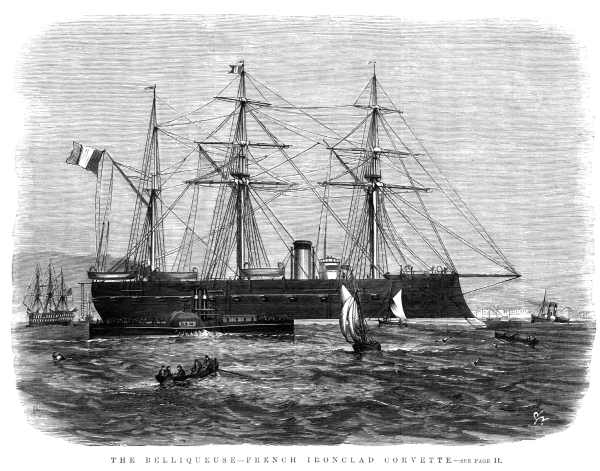
Belliqueuse in 1865

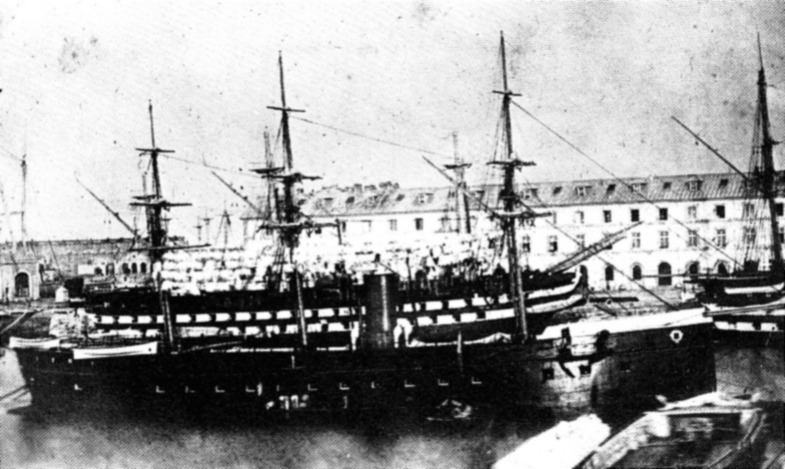
Normandie in 1870

== Central battery ships ==
- Alma class (French: Classe Alma) 3,513–3,828 tons.
  - Alma (1867) – hulked 1886.
  - Armide (1867) – stricken 1887.
  - Atalante (1868) – stricken 1887.
  - Jeanne d'Arc (1867) – stricken 1883.
  - Montcalm (1868) ex-Indienne – stricken 1891.
  - Reine Blanche (1868) – stricken 1886.
  - Thétis (1867) – stricken 1895.
- Océan class 7,580/7,775 tons.
  - Océan (1868) – stricken 1894.
  - Marengo (1869) – sold 1896.
  - Suffren (1870) – stricken 1897.
- La Galissonnière class (French: Classe La Galissonnière 4,585–4,645 tons.
  - La Galissonnière (1872) – stricken 1894.
  - Triomphante (1877) – sold 1903.
  - Victorieuse (1875) – hulked 1900.
- Friedland (1873) 8,850 tons – stricken 1902.
- Richelieu (1873) 8,984 tons – sold 1901, sank in the Bay of Biscay after sale.
- Colbert class 8,750 tons.
  - Colbert (1875) – stricken 1900.
  - Trident (1876) – hulked 1904.
- Redoutable (1876) 9,224 tons, first warship in the world to use steel as the principal building material – stricken 1910.
- Dévastation class 10,450 tons.
  - Dévastation (1879) – BU 1922.
  - Courbet (1882) ex-Foudroyant – stricken 1910.
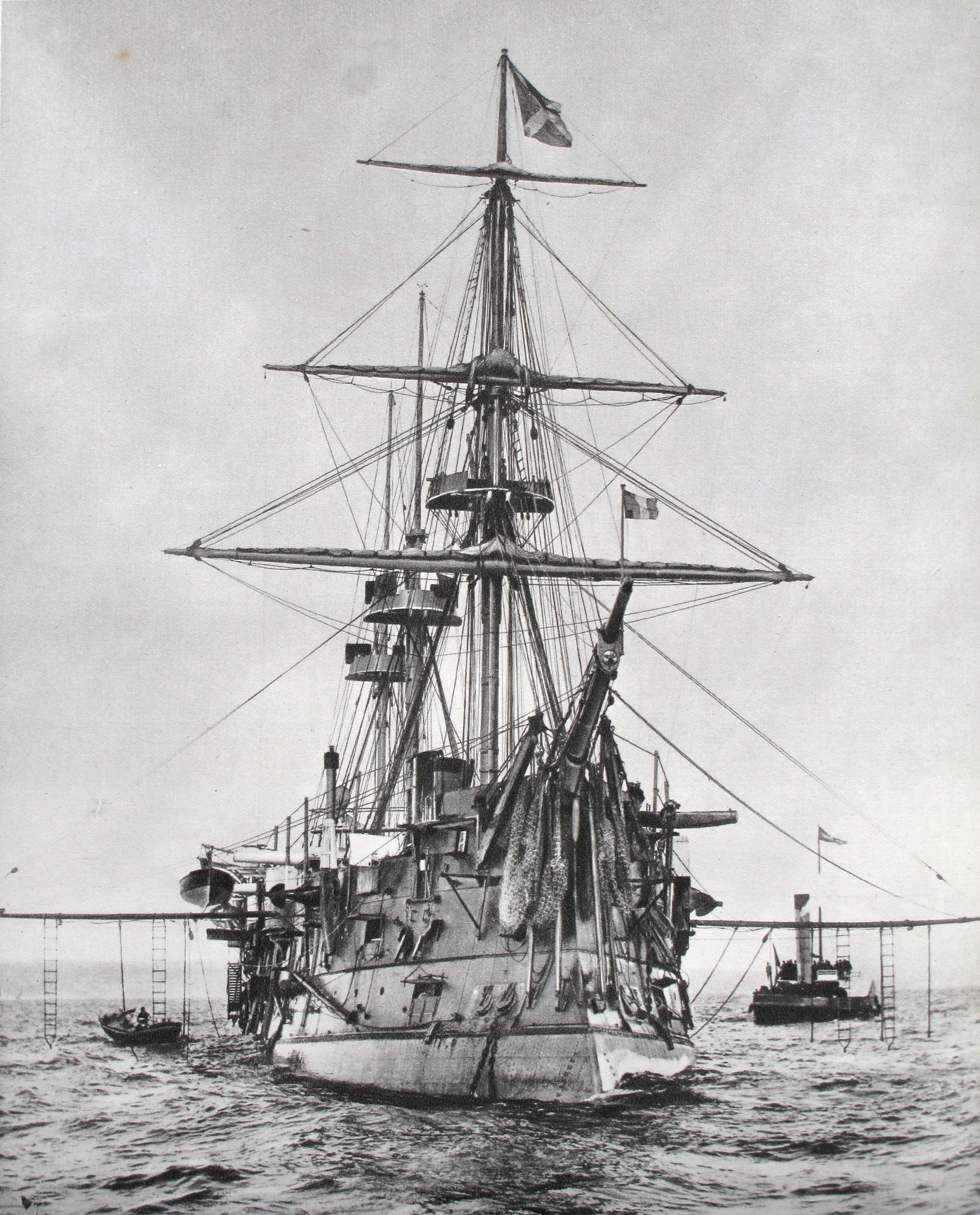
Océan in 1870

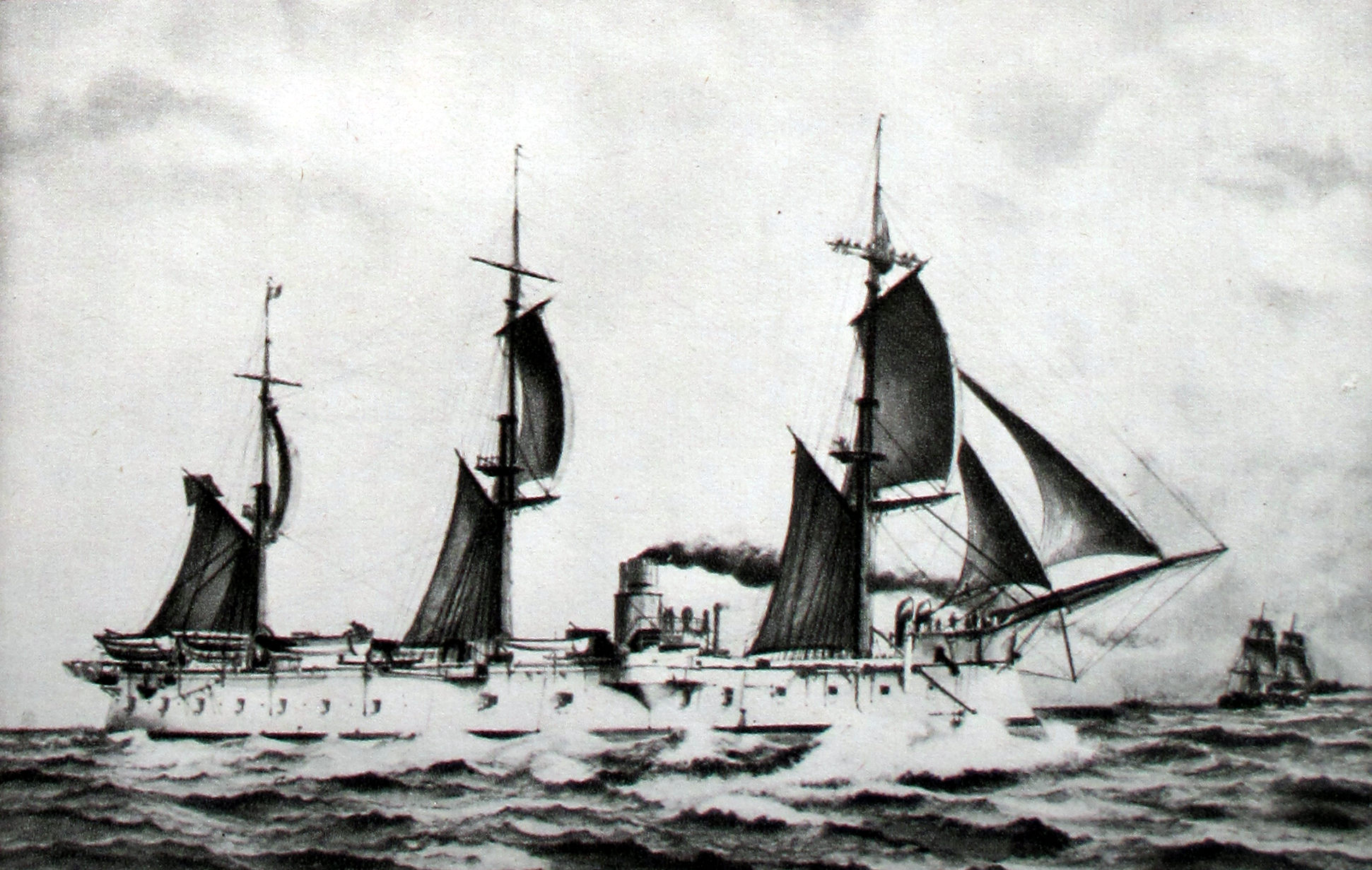
Océan

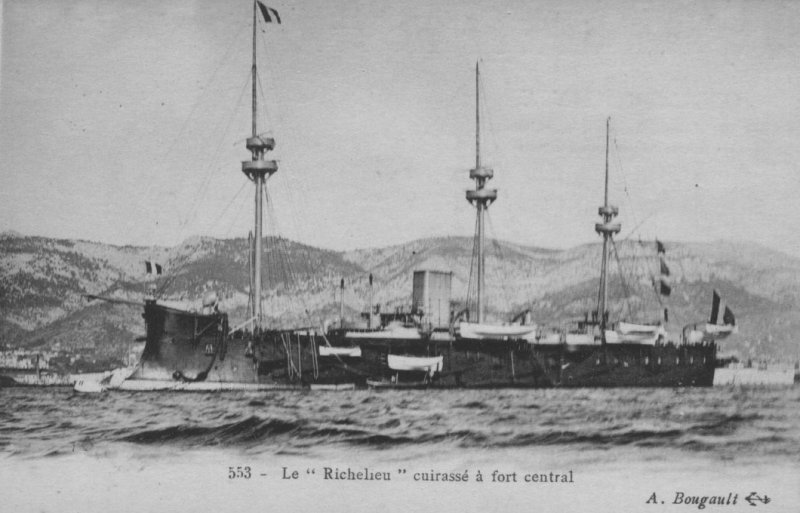
Richelieu

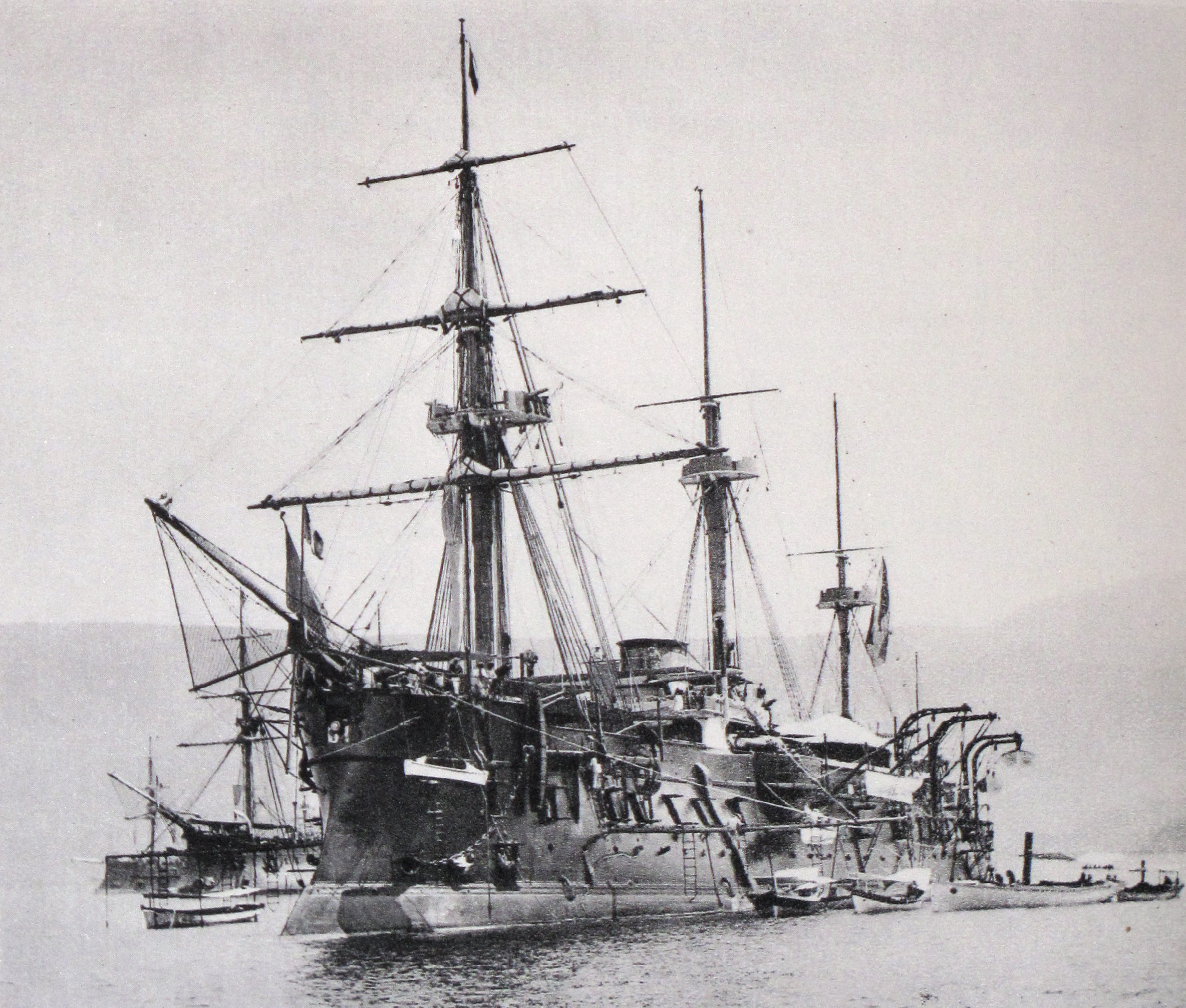
Colbert

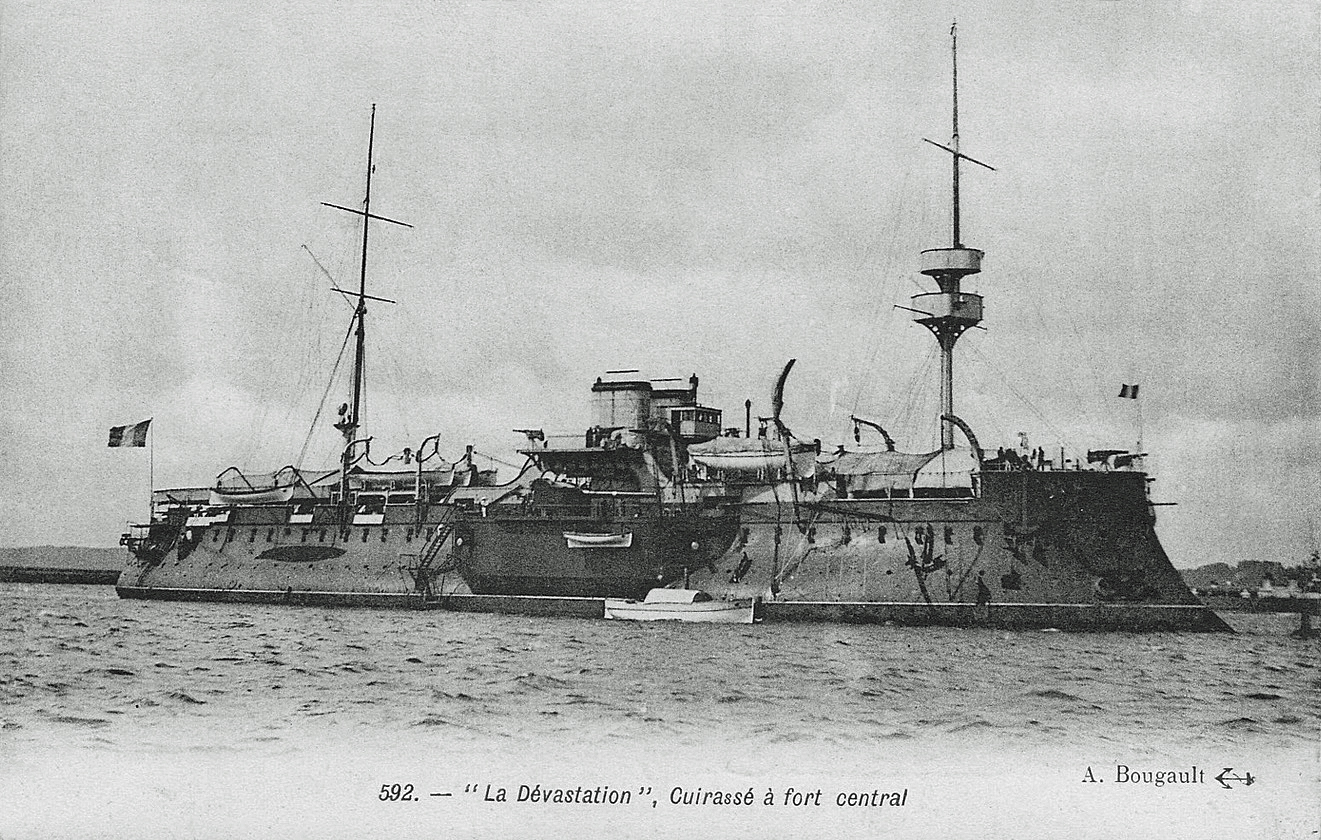
Dévastation

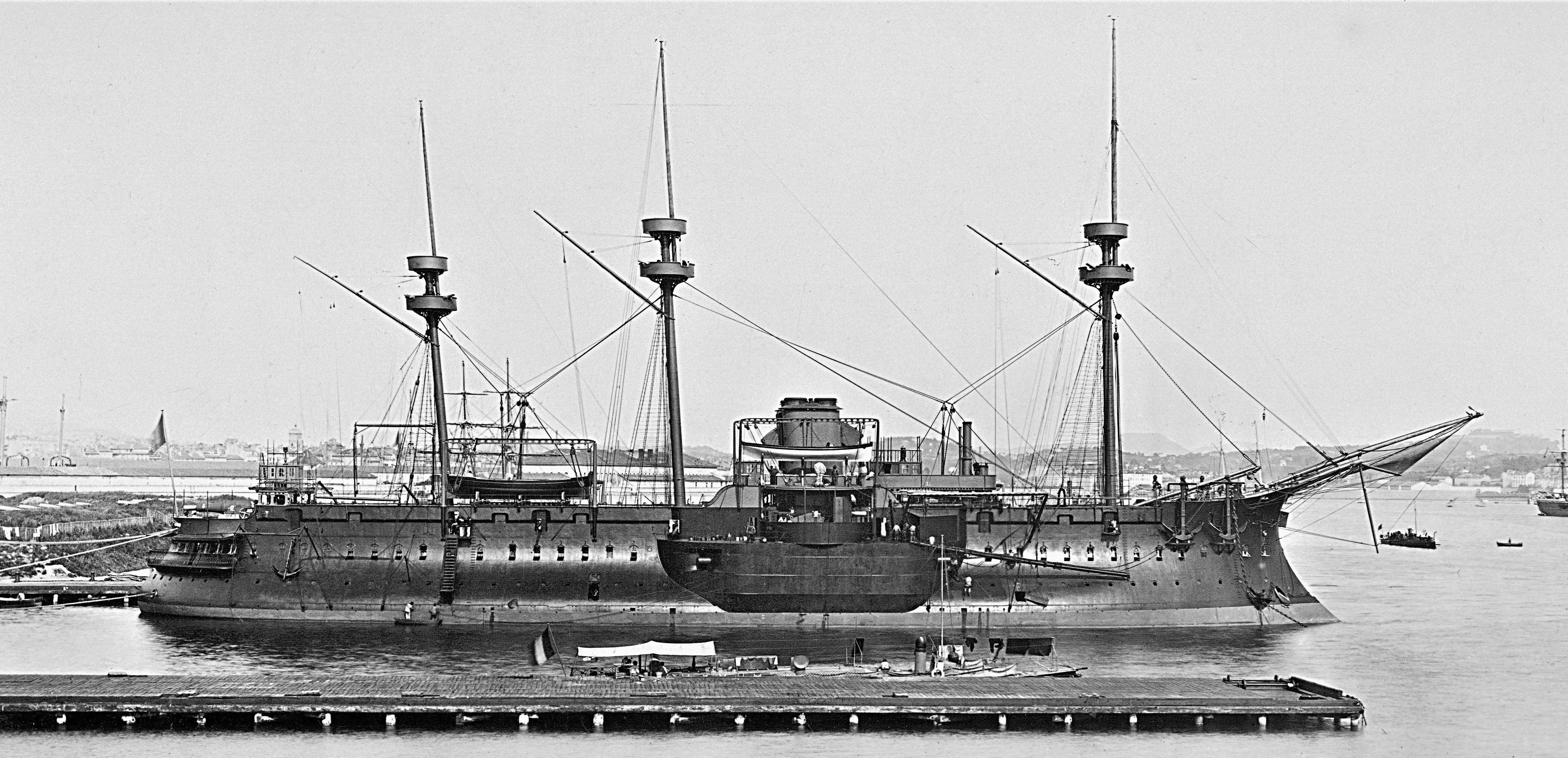
Redoutable

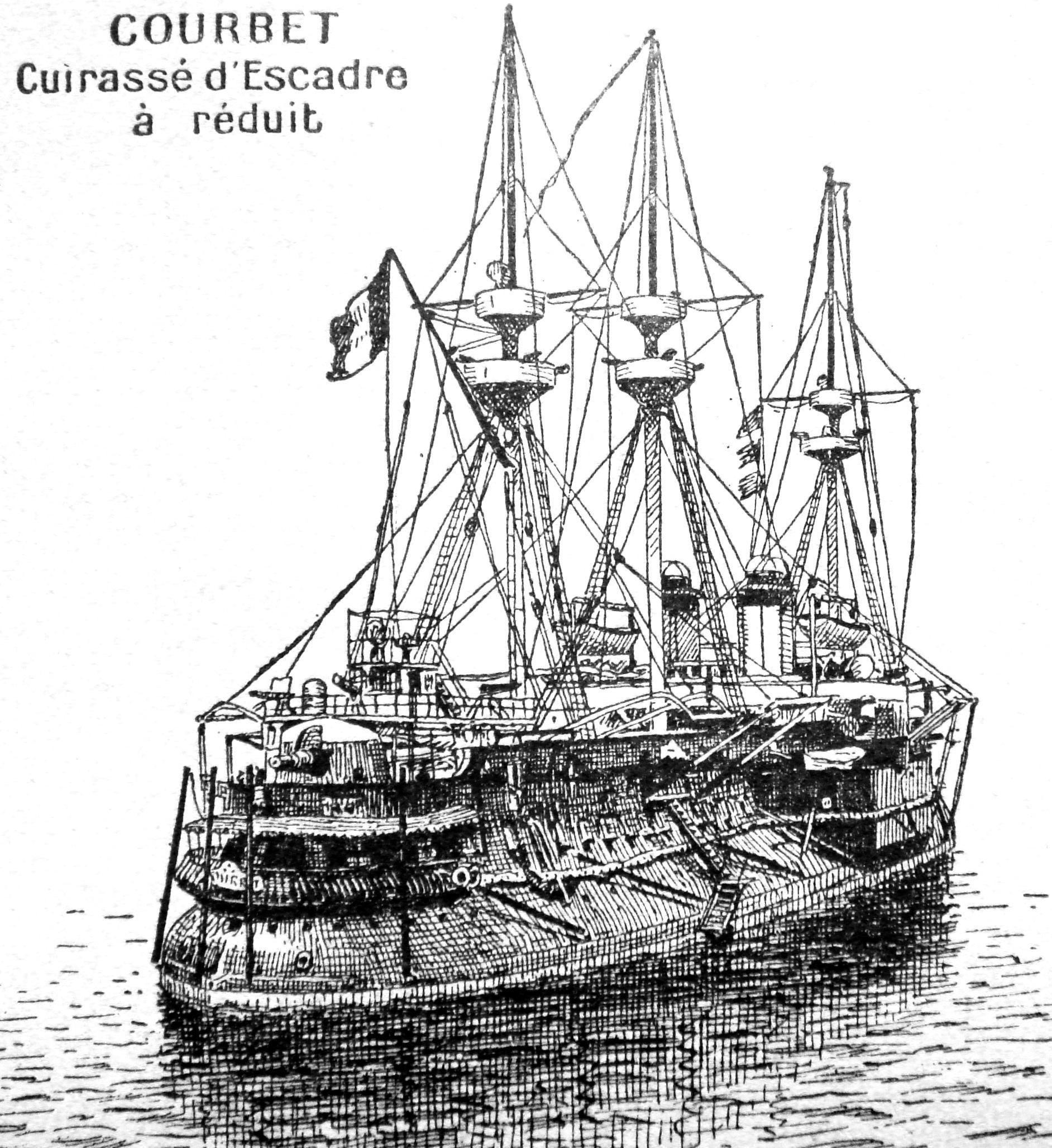
Courbet

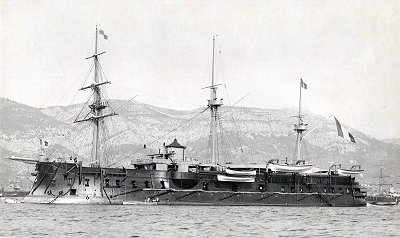
Colbert

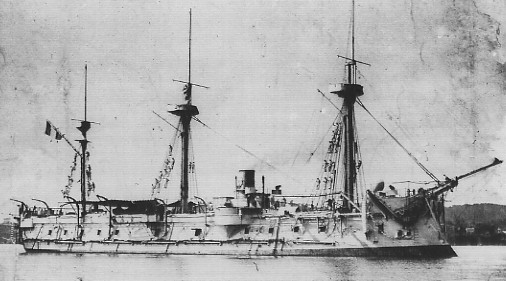
Triomphante of the La Galissonnière class

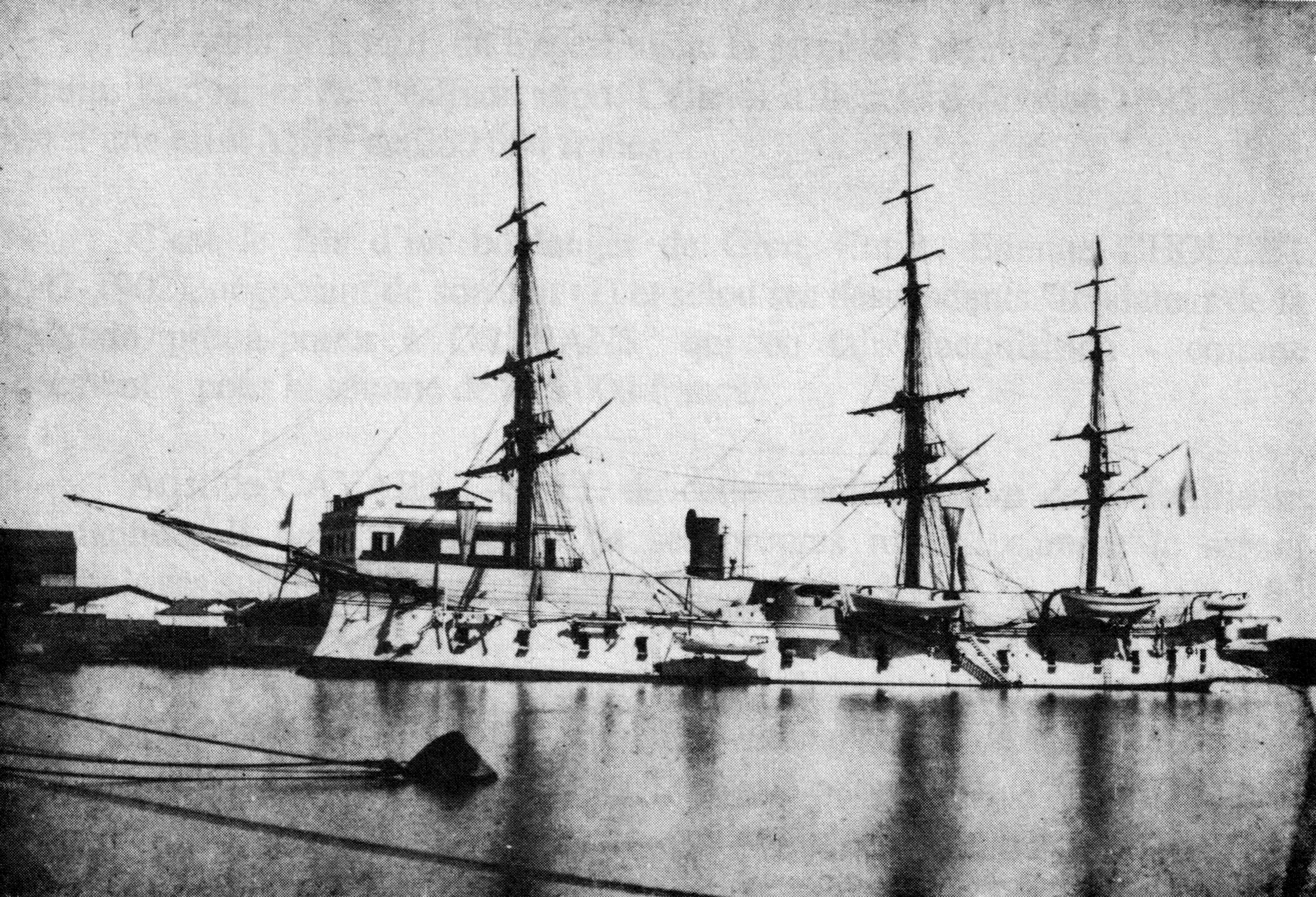
Galissoniére - 1882 - Port Said

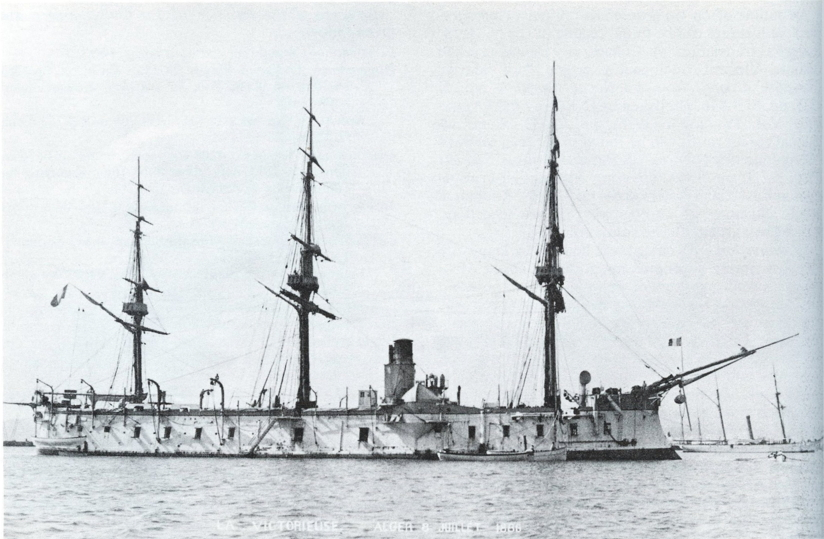
Victorieuse - 1886 - Algiers

== Barbette ships ==
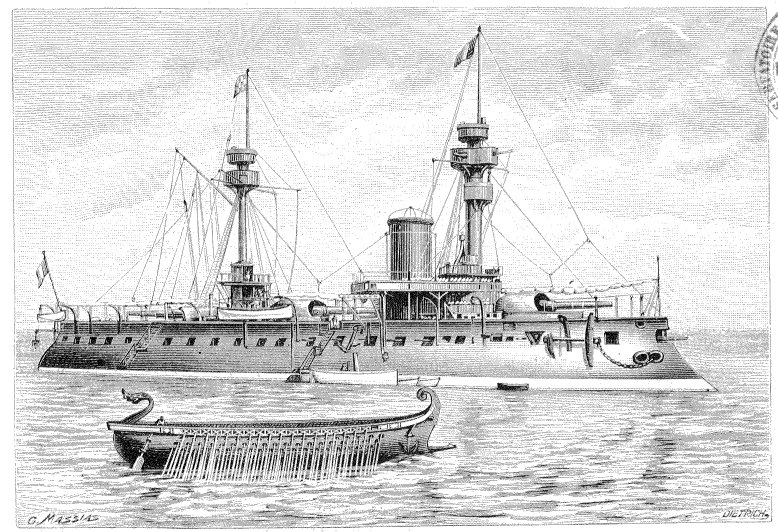
Fomidable (11580 tons) next to a war antique Hellenistic-era warship (French: Quinquérème) (no sail power) (550 tons) for perspective visualizations.

- Amiral Duperré (1879) 11,030 tons. Though this ship was designed for sail as well as steam power, her sails were removed before completion. – stricken 1909.
- Bayard class (French: Classe Bayard) 5,915–6,260 tons. Smaller versions of Amiral Duperré, with full sail power.
  - Bayard (1880) – hulked 1899.
  - Turenne (1879) – stricken 1901.
- Vauban class (French: Classe Vauban) 6,112 tons. Improved Bayards.
  - Duguesclin (1883) – stricken 1904.
  - Vauban (1882) – stricken 1905.
- Amiral Baudin class 11,720 tons, the first French sea-going battleships without any sail power.
  - Amiral Baudin (1883) – hulked 1909.
  - Formidable (1885) – stricken 1911.
- Terrible class (French: Classe Terrible) or Indomptable class, 7,530 tons. Small battleships based on the Amiral Baudin, and intended for operating in the Baltic in case of war with Germany. The British sometimes considered these to be sea-going battleships, and sometimes coastal service warships.
  - Caïman (1885) – BU 1927.
  - Indomptable (1883) – BU 1927.
  - Requin (1885) – stricken 1920.
  - Terrible (1887) – stricken 1911.
- Hoche (1886) 10,820 tons, turrets & barbettes – target 1913.
- Marceau class 10,558–10,810 tons.
  - Marceau (1887) – BU 1922.
  - Magenta (1890) – stricken 1910.
  - Neptune (1887) – stricken 1913.
- Charles Martel class 10,600–10,650 tons, slightly enlarged Marceaus.
  - Charles Martel (French: Charles Martel) (-) laid down 1883, construction suspended 1886.
  - Brennus (French: Brennus) (-) laid down 1884, construction suspended 1886.
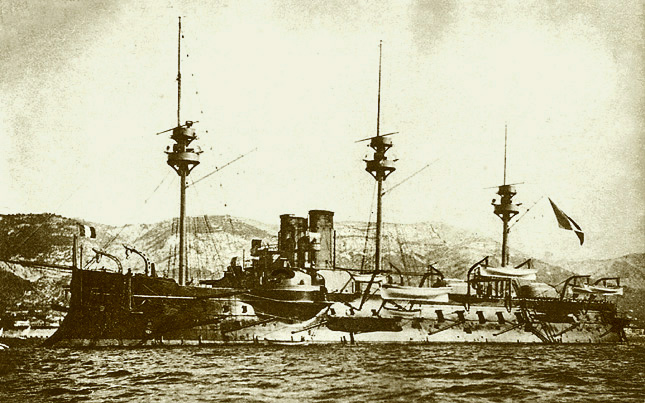
Amiral Duperré

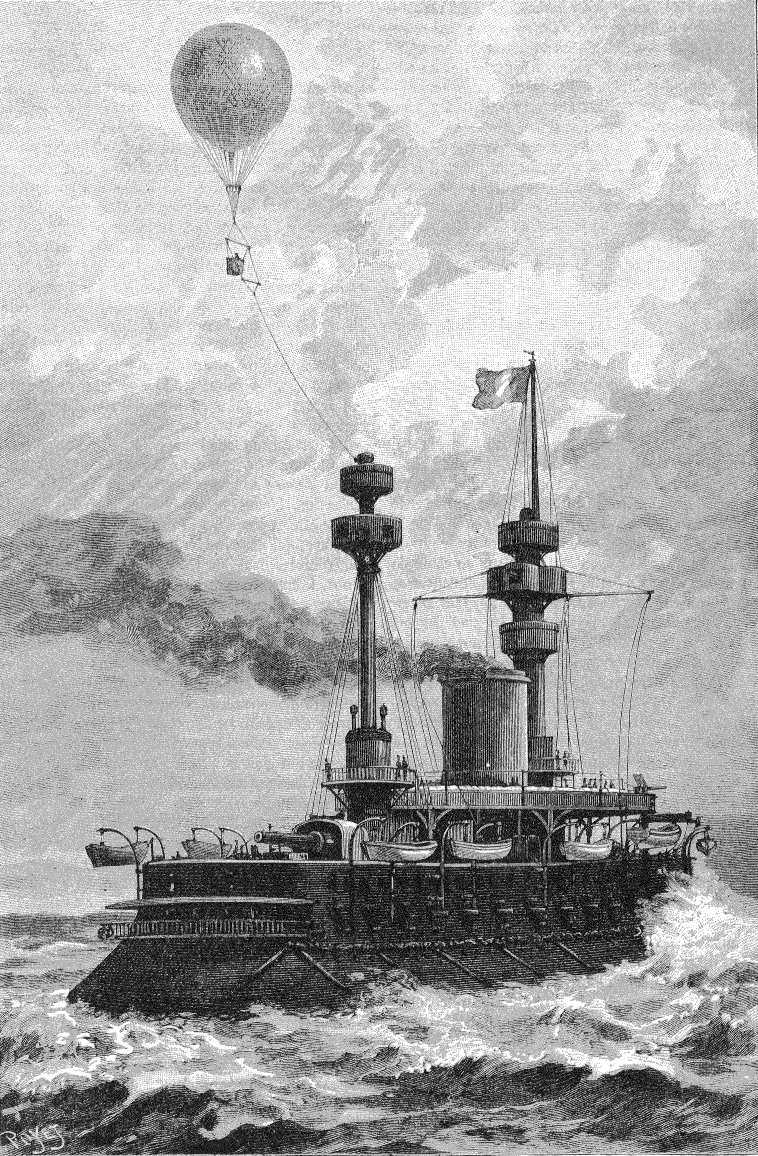
Formidable testing a balloon

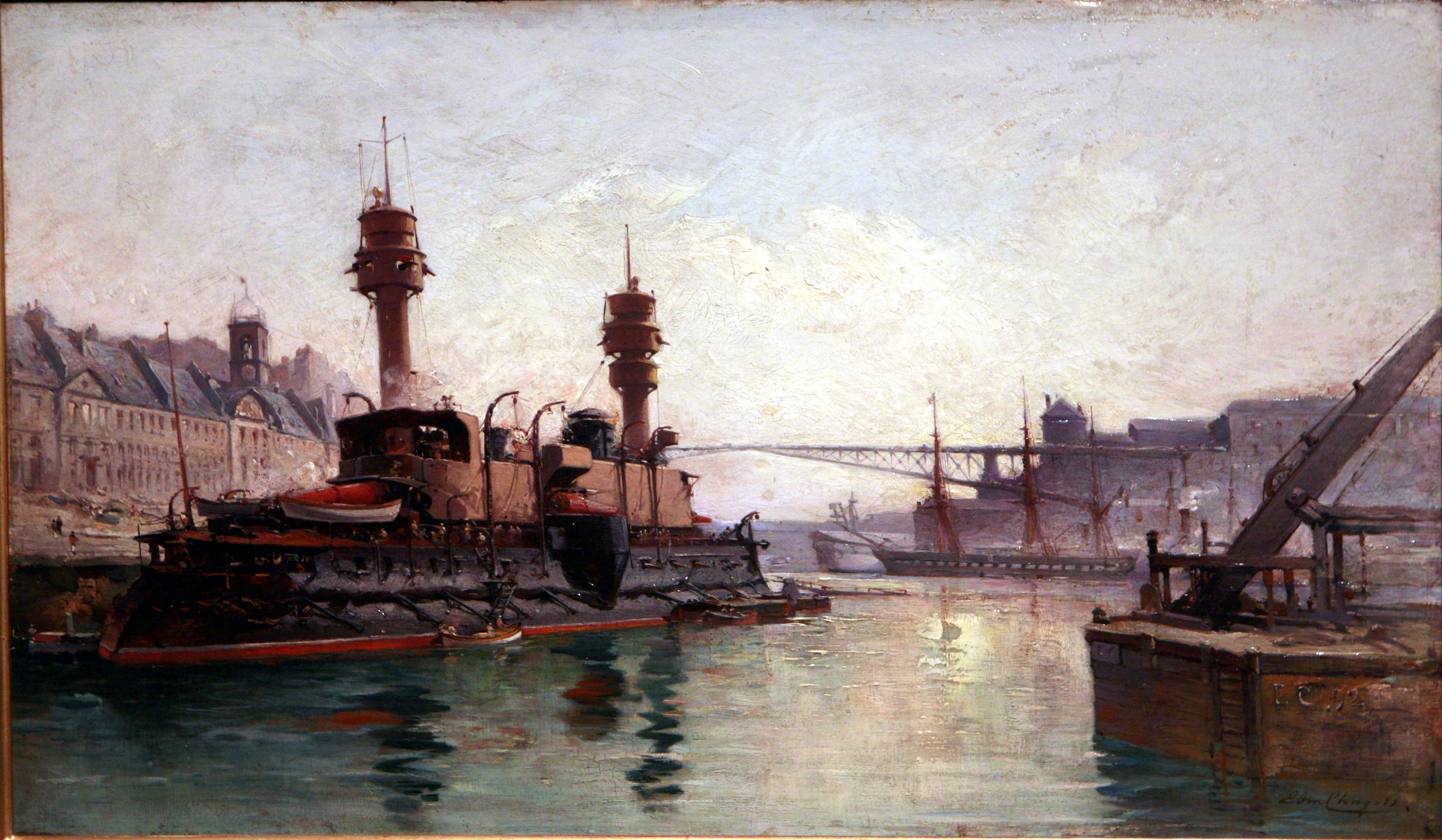
Neptune

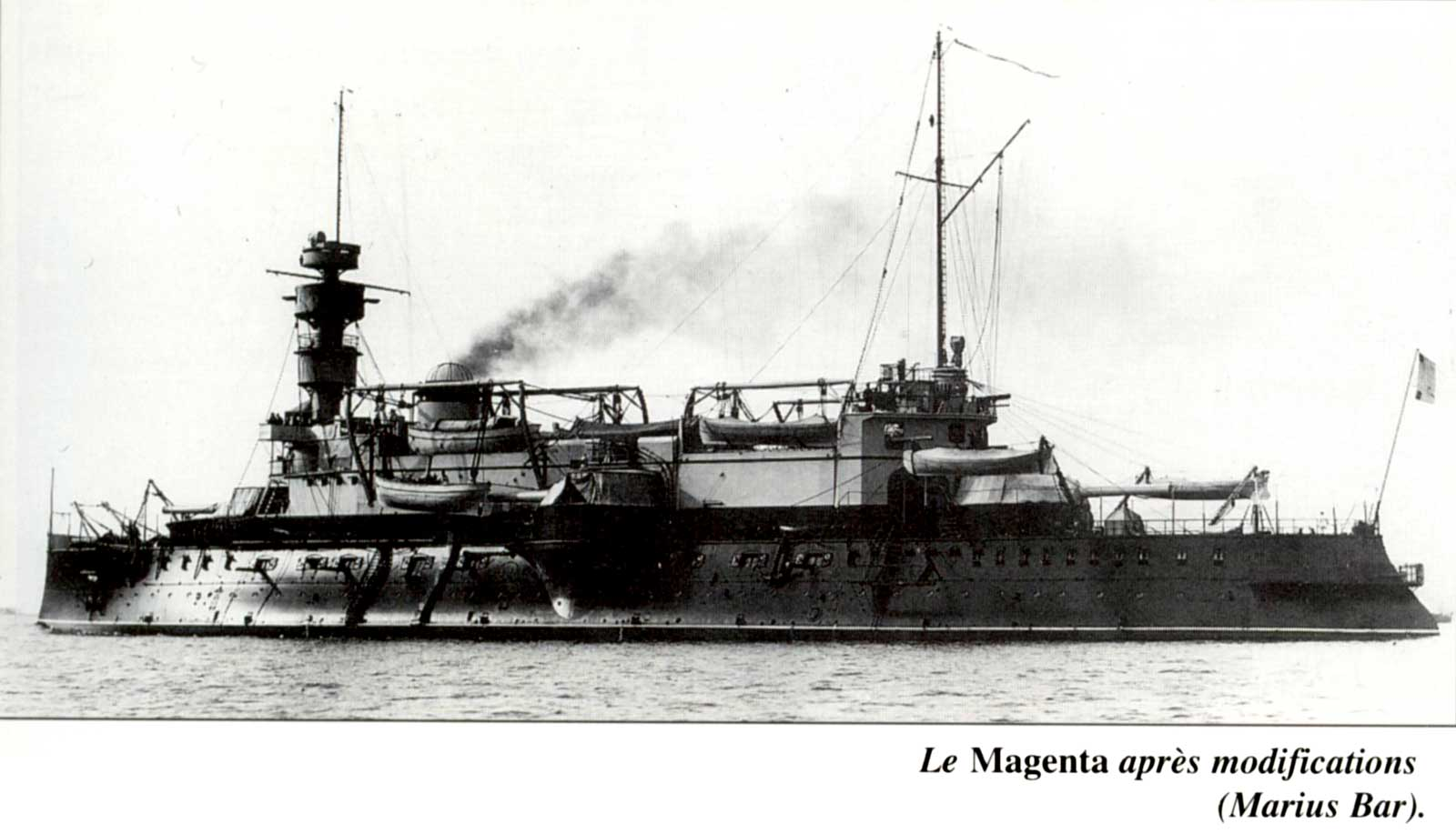
Magenta

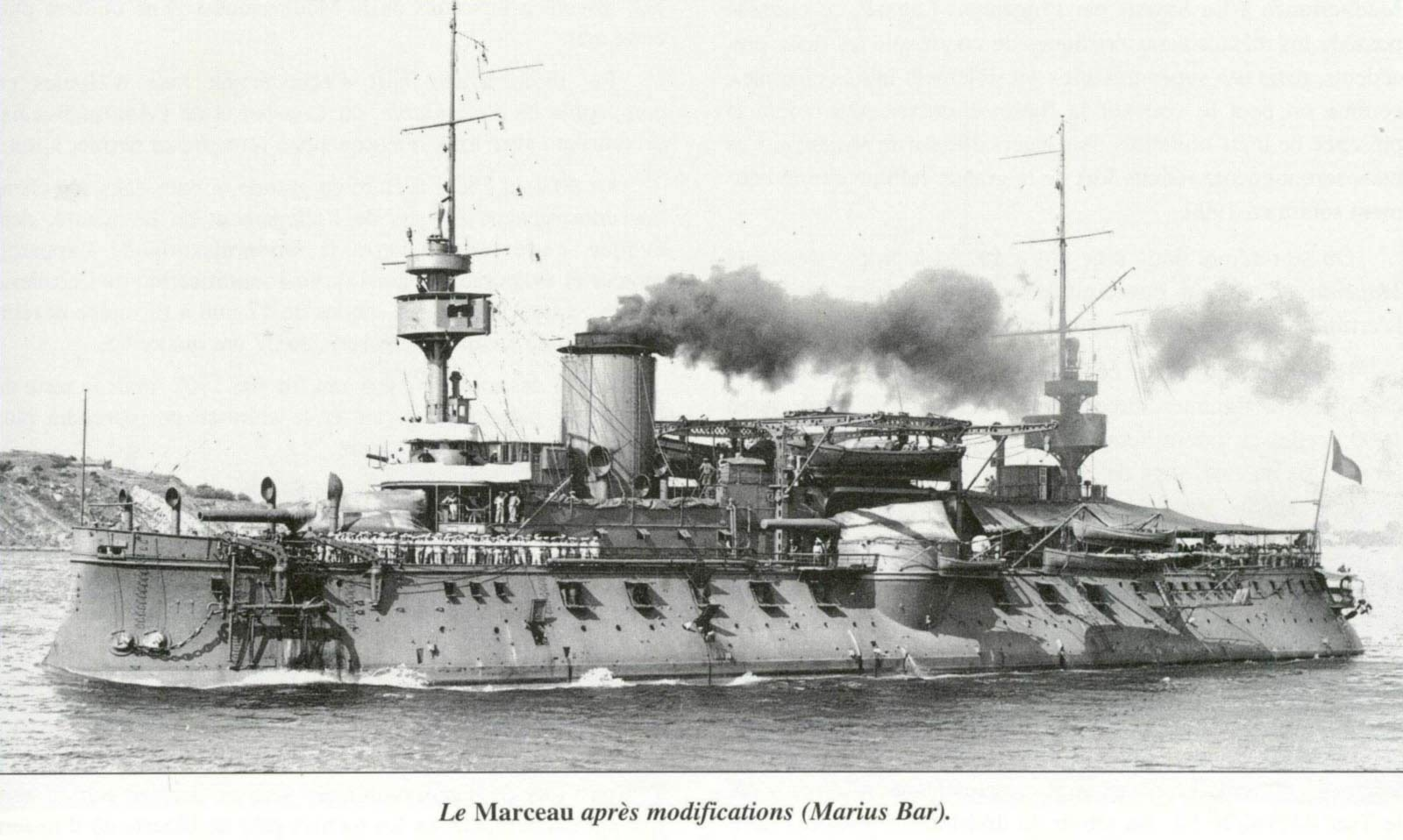
Marceau

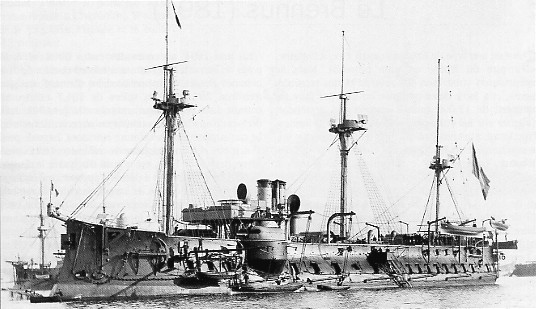
Bayard

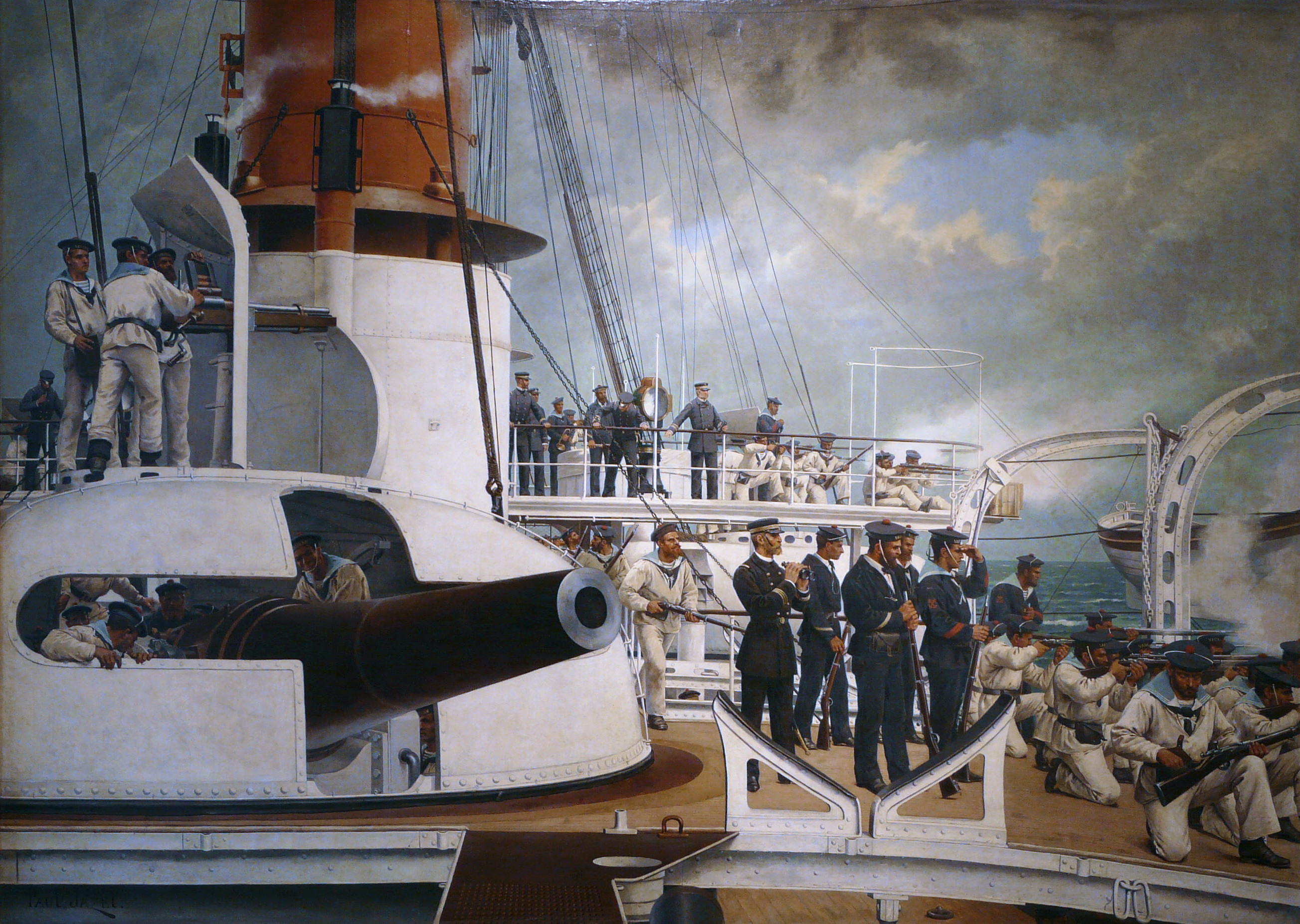
A painting by Paul Jazet (1848–1918), featuring a Vauban-class battleship

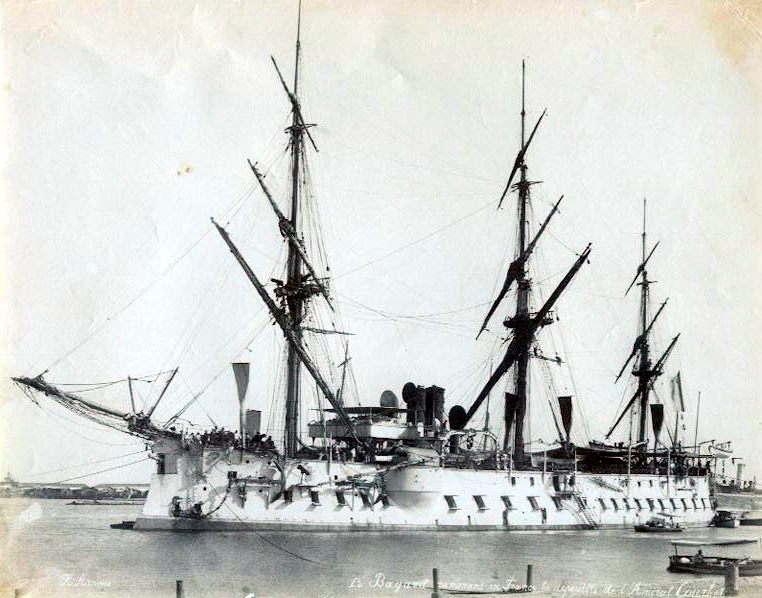
Bayard in Pord Said

== Floating batteries ==
- Dévastation class built for the Crimean War 1,600 tons.
  - Congrève – stricken 1867
  - Dévastation (1855) – stricken 1871.
  - Foudroyante (1855) – stricken 1871.
  - Lave (1855) – stricken 1871.
  - Tonnante (1855) – stricken 1871.
- Palestro class 1,508–1,539 tons.
  - Paixhans (1862) – stricken 1871.
  - Palestro (1862) – stricken 1871.
  - Pei-ho (1862) – stricken 1871.
  - Saigon (1862) – stricken 1871.
- Arrogante class 1,412-1.490 tons.
  - Arrogante (1864) – stricken 1881.
  - Implacable (1864) – stricken 1884.
  - Opiniâtre (1864) – stricken 1885.
- Embuscade class 1,426–1,589 tons.
  - Embuscade (1865) – stricken 1885.
  - Imprenable (1867) – stricken 1882.
  - Protectrice (1866) – stricken 1889.
  - Refuge (1866) – stricken 1884.

== Casemate ironclad ==
- Rochambeau (1865) ex-USS Dunderberg 7,800 tons, purchased 1867 – stricken 1872.

== Coastal defense ships ==
- Taureau (1865) barbette ship ram 2,433 tons – stricken 1890.
- Onondaga (1863) ex-USS Onondaga 2,551 tons, purchased 1867 – stricken 1904.
- Cerbère class 3,532 tons.
  - Bélier (1870) – stricken 1896.
  - Bouledogue (1872) – stricken 1897.
  - Cerbère (1868) – stricken 1887.
  - Tigre (1871) – stricken 1892.
- Tonnerre class ,1st Class Coastal Battleship, 5,765–5,871 tons.
  - Tonnerre (1875) – stricken 1905.
  - Fulminant (1877) – stricken 1908.
- Tempête class, 2nd Class Coastal Battleship, 4.635-4,793 tons.
  - Tempête (1876) – stricken 1907.
  - Vengeur (1878) – stricken 1905.
- Tonnant (French: Tonnant) (1880) barbette ship 5,010 tons. Originally intended to be similar to Tempête, but redesigned as a small battleship with increased freeboard and a gun at each end in barbettes. – stricken 1903.
- Furieux (1883) barbette ship 5,925 tons. Similar to Tonnant for the same reasons. – stricken 1913.
- Jemmapes class 6,476 tons.
  - Jemmapes (1892) – hulked 1911.
  - Valmy (1892) – stricken 1911.
- Bouvines class 6,681 tons.
  - Amiral Tréhouart (1893) – stricken 1922.
  - Bouvines (1892) – stricken 1920.
- Henri IV (1899) 8,807 tons – stricken 1921.
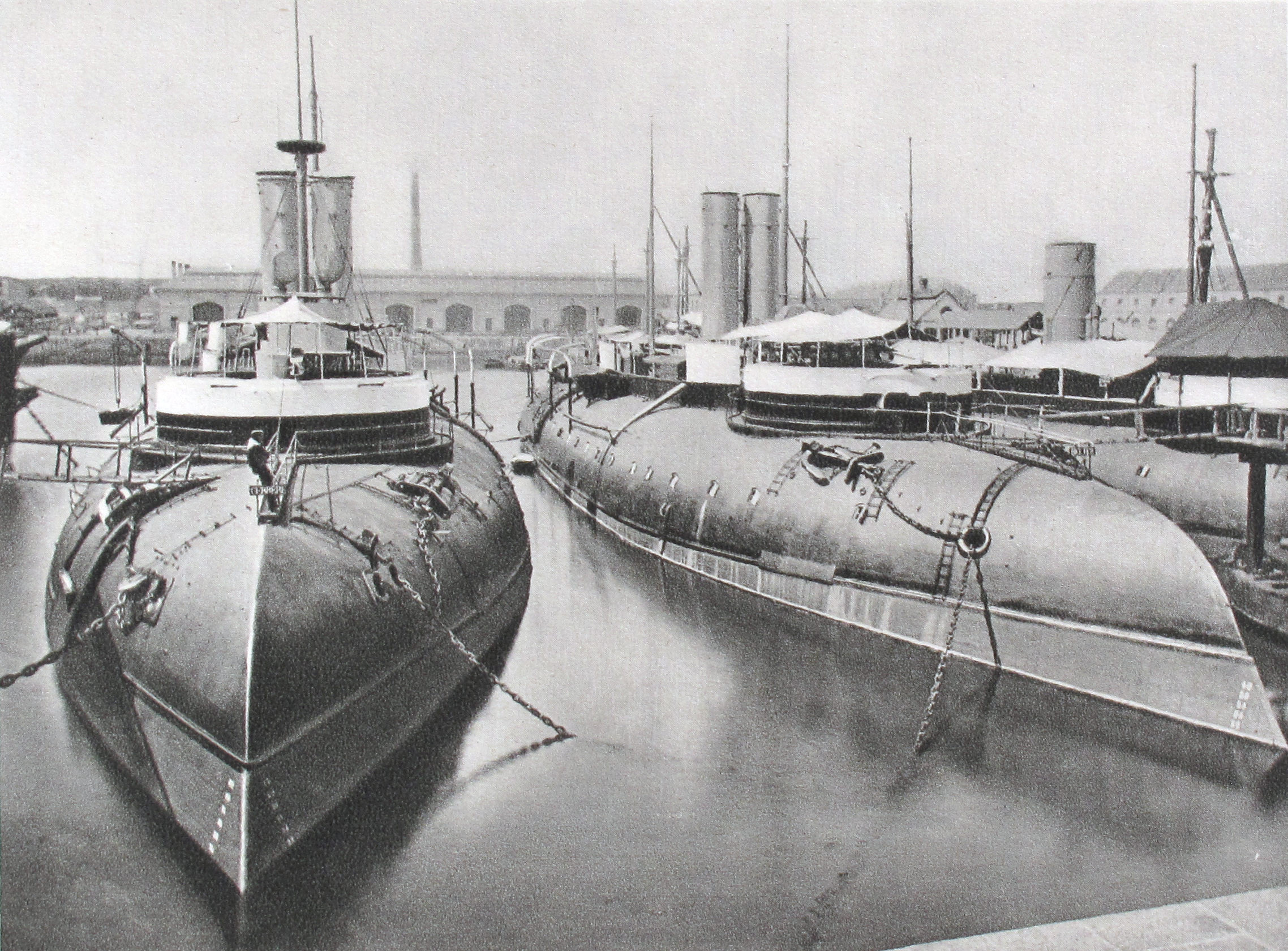
Cerbère and Bélier

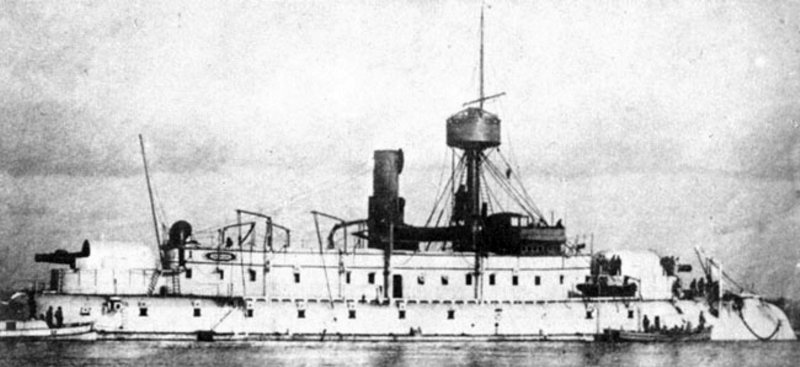
Tonnant in 1890

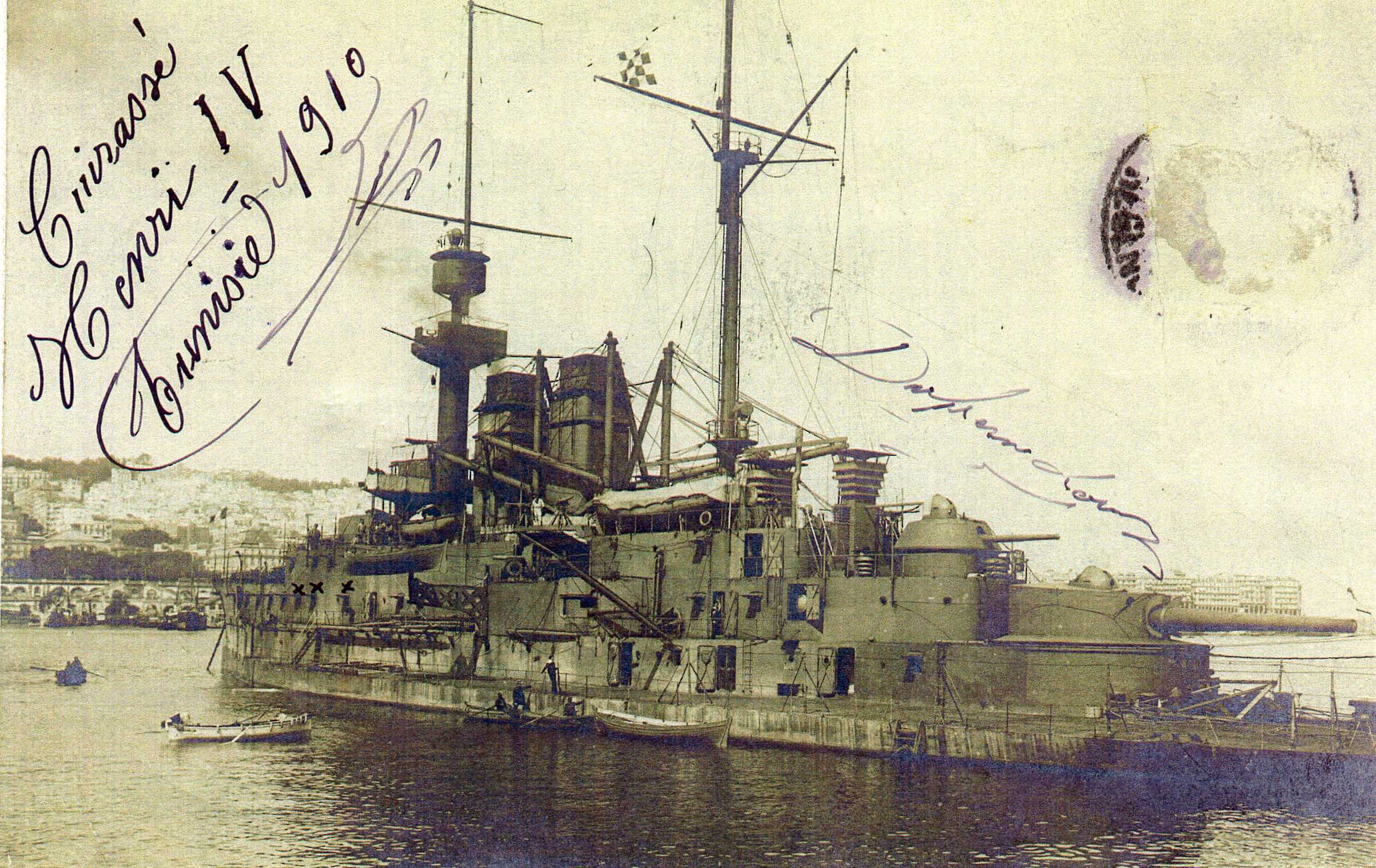
Henri IV in 1910

== See also ==
- List of ironclads
