= Charles Martel (disambiguation) =

Charles Martel (c. 688–741) was a Frankish military and political leader.

Charles Martel may also refer to:

== People ==
- Charles Martel of Anjou (1271–1295), titular King of Hungary
- Charles Martel (librarian) (1860–1945), American librarian
- Charles Martel, Duke of Calabria (1327)
- Karl Hermann Martell (1906–1966), German actor

== Other ==
- French battleship Charles Martel
  - Charles Martel-class ironclad
- Charles Martel Group, a French far-right, anti-Arab terrorist organization which operated in the 1970s and 1980s
- Charles Martel Society, publisher of The Occidental Quarterly
