= Palestro-class ironclad floating battery =

Type of ironclad vessel

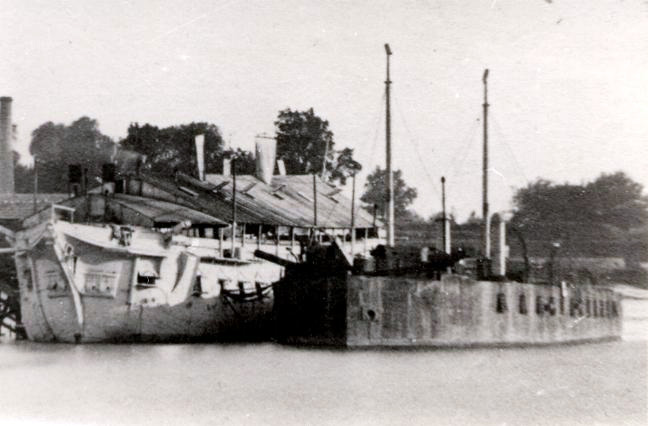
- Paixhans (right) in 1862

Class overview
- Name: Palestro class
- Operators: French Navy
- Preceded by: Dévastation class
- Succeeded by: Embuscade class
- Built: 1859–1863
- In service: 1862–1871
- Completed: 4
- Scrapped: 4

General characteristics (as built)
- Type: Ironclad floating battery
- Displacement: 1,563 t (1,538 long tons)
- Length: 47.5 m (155 ft 10 in)
- Beam: 14.04 m (46 ft 1 in)
- Draft: 3 m (9 ft 10 in)
- Installed power: 580 ihp (430 kW)
- Propulsion: 2 propellers, 2 steam engines
- Sail plan: fore-and-aft rig
- Speed: 7–7.5 knots (13.0–13.9 km/h; 8.1–8.6 mph)
- Complement: 200
- Armament: 12 × 164.7 mm (6.48 in) Mle 1860 30 pdr guns
- Armor: Waterline belt: 120 mm (4.7 in); Battery: 110 mm (4.3 in)

The Palestro class consisted of four ironclad floating batteries built for the French Navy in 1859–1862 to replace the Crimean War-built Dévastation class because of fears that the 1855 ships would deteriorate because they had been hastily built with green wood that was prone to rot quickly. Saigon caught fire and sank in 1863, but was salvaged and repaired. Pei-ho was struck from the navy list in 1869, but the others were commissioned during the Franco-Prussian War of 1870–1871.

== Design and development ==
In contrast to the Dévastation class, the Palestros were intended to serve as coastal-defense ships and were designed by the naval architect Henri Dupuy de Lôme to have greater mobility and seaworthiness than the older ships. They were also reduced in size to minimize their profile. The ships had an overall length of 47.5 m (155 ft 10 in), a beam of 14.04 m (46 ft 1 in) and a draft of 3 m (9 ft 10 in). They displaced 1,563 metric tons (1,538 long tons). The Palestro class was powered by a pair of high-pressure direct-acting steam engines, each driving a single propeller shaft. The engine was rated at 580 indicated horsepower (430 kW). The ships were designed to reach 7 knots (13 km/h; 8.1 mph), but some were slightly faster. They were fitted with two masts using a fore-and-aft rig.

The Palestros carried a main battery of a dozen 164.7 mm (6.48 in) Mle 1860 30 pdr guns on the main deck. The ships were protected by a full-length waterline belt of wrought iron that was 120 mm (4.7 in) thick. Protection for the gun battery was 110 mm (4.3 in) thick. The ship's complement numbered 200 sailors of all ranks.

== Ships ==
Construction data
Name	Laid down	Launched	Completed	Fate
Paixhans	24 May 1859	9 September 1862	July 1863	Scrapped, August 1871 – February 1872
Palestro	24 May 1859	9 September 1862	June 1863	Scrapped, August 1871 – January 1872
Pei-ho	20 July 1859	25 May 1861	October 1862	Scrapped, April 1870 – October 1871
Saigon	20 July 1859	24 June 1861	November 1862	Hulked, 1871; scrapped, 1884

== Bibliography ==
- de Balincourt, Captain & Vincent-Bréchignac, Captain (1973). "French Floating Batteries". F.P.D.S. Newsletter. I (2): 13–20. OCLC 41554533.
- Caruana, J. & Koehler, R. B. (1996). "Question 7/95: French Ironclad Floating Batteries". Warship International. XXXIII (4): 416–418. ISSN 0043-0374.
- Campbell, N. J. M. (1979). "France". In Chesneau, Roger & Kolesnik, Eugene M. (eds.). Conway's All the World's Fighting Ships 1860–1905. Greenwich: Conway Maritime Press. pp. 283–333. ISBN 0-8317-0302-4.
- Gille, Eric (1999). Cent ans de cuirassés français [A Century of French Battleships] (in French). Nantes: Marines. ISBN 2-909-675-50-5.
- Roberts, Stephen S. (2021). French Warships in the Age of Steam 1859–1914: Design, Construction, Careers and Fates. Barnsley, UK: Seaforth Publishing. ISBN 978-1-5267-4533-0.
- Roche, Jean-Michel (2005). Dictionnaire des bâtiments de la flotte de guerre française de Colbert à nos jours [Dictionary of French Warships from Colbert to Today] (in French). Vol. Tome I: 1671–1870. Toulon: Roche. ISBN 978-2-9525917-0-6. OCLC 165892922.
