= French ironclad floating battery Pei-ho =

History

France
- Name: Pei-ho
- Ordered: 18 July 1859
- Builder: Arman Brothers
- Laid down: 20 July 1859
- Launched: 25 May 1861
- Completed: October 1862
- Stricken: 15 November 1871
- Fate: Scrapped, April 1870 – October 1871

General characteristics (as built)
- Class & type: Palestro-class ironclad floating battery
- Displacement: 1,563 t (1,538 long tons)
- Length: 47.5 m (155 ft 10 in)
- Beam: 14.04 m (46 ft 1 in)
- Draft: 3 m (9 ft 10 in)
- Installed power: 580 ihp (430 kW)
- Propulsion: 2 propellers, 2 steam engines
- Sail plan: Schooner
- Speed: 7–7.5 knots (13.0–13.9 km/h; 8.1–8.6 mph)
- Complement: 200
- Armament: 12 × 164.7 mm (6.48 in) Mle 1860 30 pdr guns
- Armor: Waterline belt: 120 mm (4.7 in); Battery: 110 mm (4.3 in)

Pei-ho was a Palestro-class ironclad floating battery built for the French Navy after the Crimean War of 1854–1855. Completed in 1862, she was placed in reserve two years later. The ship was struck from the navy list in 1869 and scrapped the following year.

== Design and development ==
In contrast to the Dévastation class, the Palestros were intended to serve as coastal-defense ships and were designed to have greater mobility and seaworthiness than the older ships. They were also reduced in size to minimize their profile. The ships had an overall length of 47.5 m (155 ft 10 in), a beam of 14.04 m (46 ft 1 in) and a draft of 3 m (9 ft 10 in). They displaced 1,563 metric tons (1,538 long tons). The Palestro class was powered by a pair of high-pressure direct-acting steam engines, each driving a single propeller shaft. The engine was rated at 580 indicated horsepower (430 kW). The ships were designed to reach 7 knots (13 km/h; 8.1 mph), but some were slightly faster. They were fitted with two masts using a schooner rig. The ship's complement numbered 200 sailors of all ranks.

The Palestros carried a main battery of a dozen 164.7 mm (6.48 in) Mle 1860 30 pdr guns on the main deck. The ships were protected by a full-length waterline belt of wrought iron that was 120 mm (4.7 in) thick. Protection for the gun battery was 110 mm (4.3 in) thick. At some point, the Mle 1860 guns were replaced by Mle 1864 rifled breech-loading guns and then reduced in number to 10 guns.

== Construction and career ==
Pei-ho was ordered on 18 July 1859 and laid down at the Arman Brothers shipyard in Bordeaux two days later. The ship was launched on 25 May 1861 and completed in October 1862. She was placed in reserve in 1864 and remained there until she was struck from the navy list on 15 November 1869. She was broken up beginning in April 1870.

== Bibliography ==
- de Balincourt, Captain & Vincent-Bréchignac, Captain (1973). "French Floating Batteries". F.P.D.S. Newsletter. I (2): 13–20. OCLC 41554533.
- Caruana, J. & Koehler, R. B. (1996). "Question 7/95: French Ironclad Floating Batteries". Warship International. XXXIII (4): 416–418. ISSN 0043-0374.
- Gille, Eric (1999). Cent ans de cuirassés français [A Century of French Battleships] (in French). Nantes: Marines. ISBN 2-909-675-50-5.
- Roberts, Stephen S. (2021). French Warships in the Age of Steam 1859–1914: Design, Construction, Careers and Fates. Barnsley, UK: Seaforth Publishing. ISBN 978-1-5267-4533-0.
- Roche, Jean-Michel (2005). Dictionnaire des bâtiments de la flotte de guerre française de Colbert à nos jours [Dictionary of French Warships from Colbert to Today] (in French). Vol. Tome I: 1671–1870. Toulon: Roche. ISBN 978-2-9525917-0-6. OCLC 165892922.
