= French ironclad floating battery Imprenable =

History

France
- Name: Imprenable
- Ordered: September 1861
- Builder: Arman Brothers, Bordeaux
- Laid down: 25 February 1862
- Launched: 18 December 1867
- Completed: August 1867
- Reclassified: Hulked, 1882
- Stricken: 7 March 1882
- Fate: Scrapped, 1939

General characteristics (as built)
- Class & type: Embuscade-class ironclad floating battery
- Displacement: 1,615 t (1,589 long tons)
- Length: 39.65 m (130 ft 1 in)
- Beam: 15.8 m (51 ft 10 in)
- Draft: 3.52 m (11.5 ft) (mean)
- Installed power: 4 boilers; 480 ihp (360 kW)
- Propulsion: 2 propellers, 2 return connecting rod engines
- Sail plan: fore-and-aft
- Speed: 8.5 knots (15.7 km/h; 9.8 mph)
- Range: 670 nmi (1,240 km; 770 mi) at 8.5 knots (15.7 km/h; 9.8 mph)
- Complement: 190
- Armament: 4 × 164.7 mm (6.48 in) Mle 1864 guns; 4 × 164.7 mm Mle 1860 guns
- Armor: Waterline belt: 140 mm (5.5 in); Battery: 110 mm (4.3 in)

Imprenable was a Embuscade-class ironclad floating battery built for the French Navy during the 1860s. Completed in 1867, she spent most of her career in reserve although she was briefly commissioned during the Franco-Prussian War of 1870–1871.

== Bibliography ==
- de Balincourt, Captain & Vincent-Bréchignac, Captain (1973). "French Floating Batteries". F.P.D.S. Newsletter. I (2): 13–20. OCLC 41554533.
- Caruana, J. & Koehler, R. B. (1996). "Question 7/95: French Ironclad Floating Batteries". Warship International. XXXIII (4): 416–418. ISSN 0043-0374.
- Gille, Eric (1999). Cent ans de cuirassés français [A Century of French Battleships] (in French). Nantes: Marines. ISBN 2-909-675-50-5.
- Roberts, Stephen S. (2021). French Warships in the Age of Steam 1859–1914: Design, Construction, Careers and Fates. Barnsley, UK: Seaforth Publishing. ISBN 978-1-5267-4533-0.
- Roche, Jean-Michel (2005). Dictionnaire des bâtiments de la flotte de guerre française de Colbert à nos jours [Dictionary of French Warships from Colbert to Today] (in French). Vol. Tome I: 1671–1870. Toulon: Roche. ISBN 978-2-9525917-0-6. OCLC 165892922.
