= Embuscade-class ironclad floating battery =

Type of ironclad vessel

Class overview
- Name: Palestro class
- Builders: Arman Brothers, Bordeaux
- Operators: French Navy
- Preceded by: Arrogante class
- Built: 1862–1868
- In service: 1866–1889
- Completed: 4
- Scrapped: 4

General characteristics
- Type: Ironclad floating battery
- Displacement: 1,615 t (1,589 long tons)
- Length: 39.65 m (130 ft 1 in)
- Beam: 15.8 m (51 ft 10 in)
- Draft: 3.52 m (11.5 ft) (mean)
- Installed power: 4 boilers; 480 ihp (360 kW)
- Propulsion: 2 propellers, 2 return connecting rod engines
- Sail plan: fore-and-aft
- Speed: 8.5 knots (15.7 km/h; 9.8 mph)
- Range: 670 nmi (1,240 km; 770 mi) at 8.5 knots (15.7 km/h; 9.8 mph)
- Complement: 190
- Armament: 4 × 164.7 mm (6.48 in) Mle 1864 guns; 4 × 164.7 mm Mle 1860 guns
- Armor: Waterline belt: 140 mm (5.5 in); Battery: 110 mm (4.3 in)

The Embuscade class consisted of four ironclad floating batteries built for the French Navy in the 1860s.

== Ships ==
Construction data
Name	Laid down	Launched	Completed	Fate
Embuscade	25 February 1862	18 November 1865	September 1866	Scrapped, 1945
Refuge	25 February 1862	1 May 1866	October 1867	Scrapped, 1945?
Protectrice	25 February 1862	8 December 1866	August 1867	Scrapped, 1890
Imprenable	18 December 1867	February 1868	Scrapped, 1939	

== Bibliography ==
- de Balincourt, Captain & Vincent-Bréchignac, Captain (1973). "French Floating Batteries". F.P.D.S. Newsletter. I (2): 13–20. OCLC 41554533.
- Caruana, J. & Koehler, R. B. (1996). "Question 7/95: French Ironclad Floating Batteries". Warship International. XXXIII (4): 416–418. ISSN 0043-0374.
- Campbell, N. J. M. (1979). "France". In Chesneau, Roger & Kolesnik, Eugene M. (eds.). Conway's All the World's Fighting Ships 1860–1905. Greenwich: Conway Maritime Press. pp. 283–333. ISBN 0-8317-0302-4.
- Gille, Eric (1999). Cent ans de cuirassés français [A Century of French Battleships] (in French). Nantes: Marines. ISBN 2-909-675-50-5.
- Roberts, Stephen S. (2021). French Warships in the Age of Steam 1859–1914: Design, Construction, Careers and Fates. Barnsley, UK: Seaforth Publishing. ISBN 978-1-5267-4533-0.
- Roche, Jean-Michel (2005). Dictionnaire des bâtiments de la flotte de guerre française de Colbert à nos jours [Dictionary of French Warships from Colbert to Today] (in French). Vol. Tome I: 1671–1870. Toulon: Roche. ISBN 978-2-9525917-0-6. OCLC 165892922.
