= Charles Martel-class ironclad =

Cancelled ironclad warship class of the French Navy

Class overview
- Name: Charles Martel-class ironclad
- Preceded by: Marceau class
- Succeeded by: Brennus
- Planned: 4
- Completed: 0
- Cancelled: 4

General characteristics (Louis de Bussy's design)
- Type: Turret ship
- Displacement: 9,742 t (9,588 long tons; 10,739 short tons)
- Length: 105 m (344 ft 6 in) lwl
- Beam: 19.36 m (63 ft 6 in)
- Draft: 8 m (26 ft 3 in)
- Installed power: 12 × fire-tube boilers
- Propulsion: 3 × triple-expansion steam engines; 2 × screw propellers
- Speed: 17 knots (31 km/h; 20 mph)
- Range: 5,000 nautical miles (9,300 km; 5,800 mi) at 10 knots (19 km/h; 12 mph)
- Crew: 500
- Armament: 4 × 340 mm (13.4 in) guns; 8 × 138.6 mm (5.46 in) guns; 37 mm (1.5 in) Hotchkiss revolver cannon
- Armor: Armored citadel: 450 mm (17.7 in); Main deck: 20 to 75 mm (0.79 to 2.95 in); Gun turrets: 400 mm (15.7 in)

General characteristics (Charles Ernest Huin's design)
- Type: Barbette ship
- Displacement: 10,649.5 t (10,481.3 long tons; 11,739.1 short tons)
- Length: 107.6 m (353 ft) loa
- Beam: 20.25 m (66 ft 5 in)
- Draft: 8.3 m (27 ft)
- Installed power: 8 × boilers
- Propulsion: 2 × steam engines; 2 × screw propellers
- Speed: 16.4 knots (30.4 km/h; 18.9 mph)
- Range: 2,900 nmi (5,400 km; 3,300 mi) at 10 knots (19 km/h; 12 mph)
- Crew: 450
- Armament: 4 × 340 mm (13.4 in) guns; 17 × 138.6 mm (5.46 in) guns; 14 × 37 mm (1.5 in) Hotchkiss revolver cannon
- Armor: Belt: 300 to 450 mm (11.8 to 17.7 in); Deck: 70 mm (2.8 in); Barbettes: 350 mm (13.8 in)

The Charles Martel class was a planned class of ironclad barbette ships of the French Navy in the 1880s. The class initially comprised two ships, Charles Martel and Brennus, though two additional vessels were considered. An initial design broke with previous French practices and adopted an arrangement more similar to contemporary British designs, including a main battery carried in armored gun turrets instead of open barbettes, and an armored citadel rather than a complete, waterline armor belt.

The design proved to be controversial, and a new French Minister of Marine suspended work on Brennus and Charles Martel, cancelled the other two ships, and ordered a new design based on the preceding Marceau class. Confusion over the specific timeline of construction exists in the available sources, but by January 1886, yet another Minister of Marine, Théophile Aube, cancelled both ships in favor of the Jeune École doctrine he supported. Some sources have mistakenly conflated these two ships with the later pre-dreadnought battleships Brennus and French battleship Charles Martel, which were built a decade later, but they are distinct vessels.

== Background ==
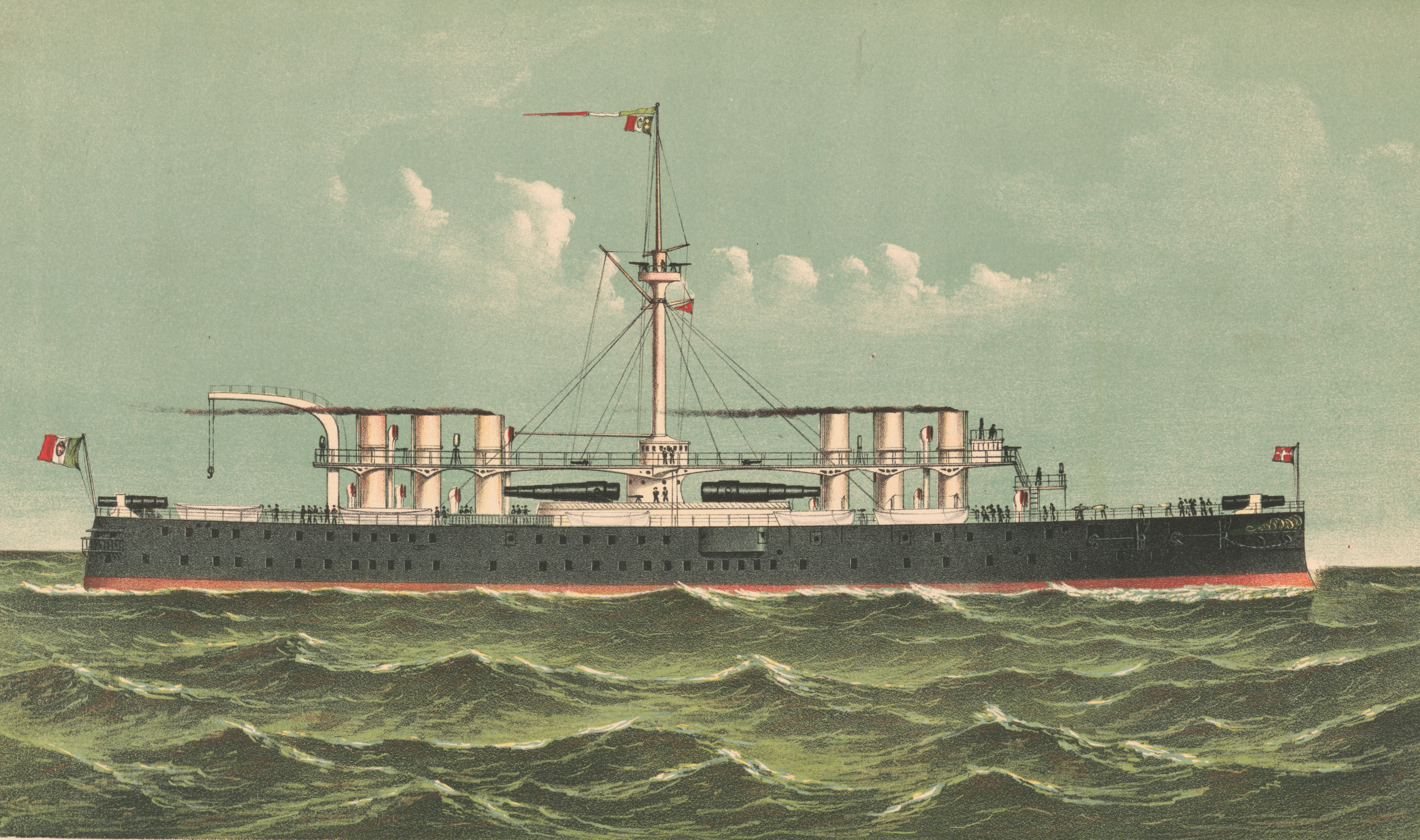
The fast Italian ironclad Italia, the threat of which prompted the French to design the Charles Martel class

After the Franco-Prussian War of 1870–1871, the French Navy embarked on a construction program to strengthen the fleet in 1872 and to replace older vessels that had been built in the 1860s. By the early 1870s, the Italian Regia Marina (Royal Navy) had begun its own expansion program under the direction of Benedetto Brin, which included the construction of several very large ironclad warships of the Duilio and Italia classes, armed with 450 mm (17.7 in) 100-ton guns. The French initially viewed the ships as not worthy of concern, but by 1877, public pressure over the new Italian vessels prompted the Navy's Conseil des Travaux (Board of Construction) to respond, beginning with the barbette ship Amiral Duperré and following with six vessels carrying 100-ton guns of French design. The first of these were the two Amiral Baudin-class ironclads, which carried their guns in open barbettes, all on the centerline, with one forward and two aft.

By the early 1880s, the very large guns had fallen out of favor in the French Navy, so the remaining four ships, to be laid down beginning in 1880, were redesigned with smaller but equally powerful weapons. These became the Marceau class, which was to have comprised four ships but ultimately included only three. The first vessel that was laid down, Hoche, had to be reworked after it was realized that the ship was too small for the intended displacement. The remaining three ships, which had not yet been laid down, could be enlarged to the necessary dimensions. All four ships arranged their main battery in a lozenge pattern with one forward, one aft, and a wing mount on either side amidships to maximize end-on fire (which was emphasized by those who favored ramming attacks).

At the same time, developments with quick-firing guns rendered the generation of French capital ships designed in the 1870s and early 1880s dangerously vulnerable to damage above the waterline. These ships used shallow waterline belt armor to protect their sides, but most of their hulls were unprotected by armor altogether. Many navies began to incorporate thin side protection above the belt to deal with the threat. Further complicating matters were the developments of self-propelled torpedoes and small, fast torpedo boats that posed an existential threat to the battleship-dominated fleets of the European navies.

== First proposal ==
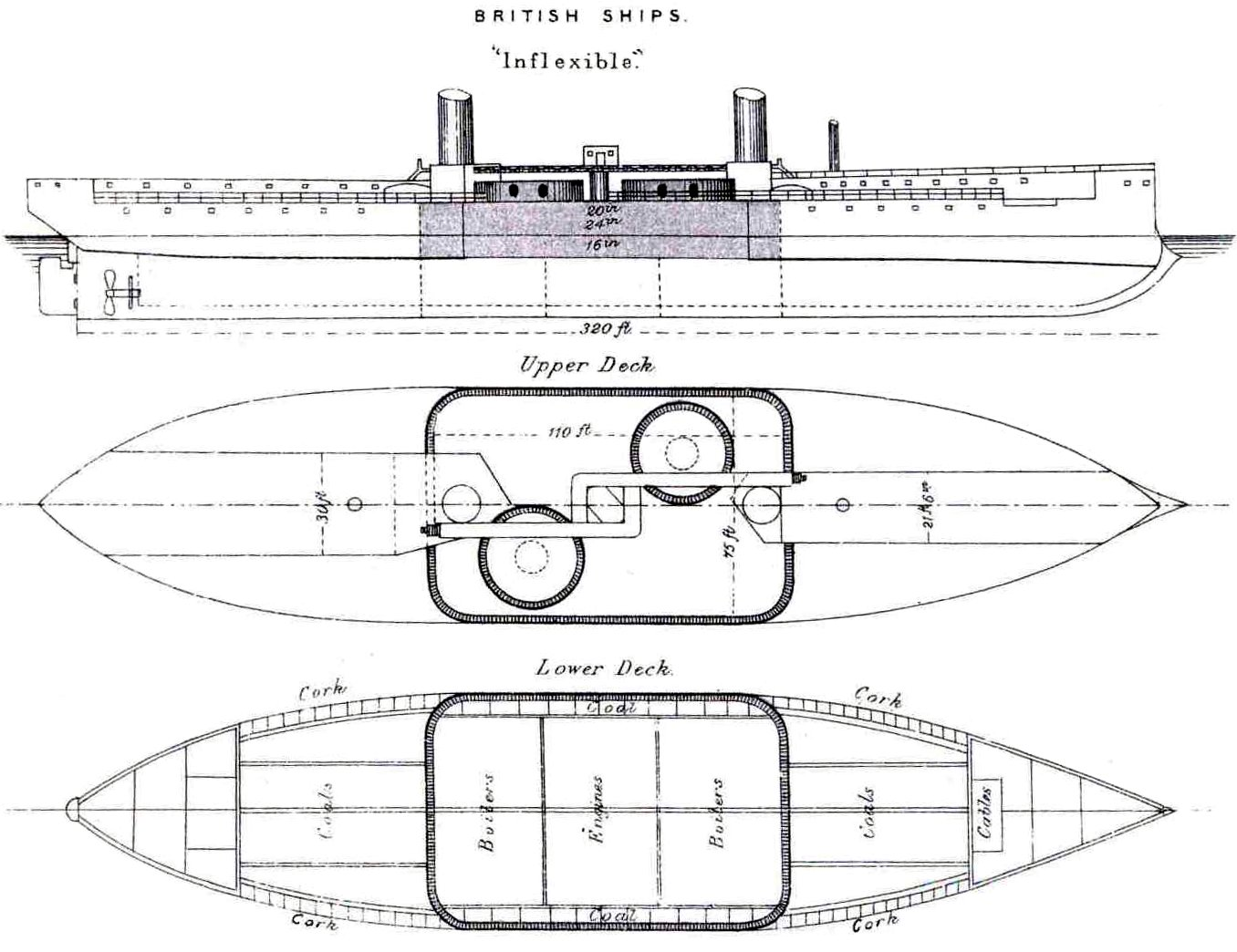
Plans of the British HMS Inflexible, which de Bussy's design resembled

The fleet program of 1880 projected a total of six new ironclad battleships; the first four were to be the three Marceaus and Hoche. The remaining pair of vessels was due to begin construction in 1882; they were submitted as part of the budget for that year in January 1881. The government ordered the two new ships on 25 November, to have been named Brennus and Charles Martel, but by March 1882, had decided to delay them until the 1883 fiscal year. Design work on the new class began on 10 March, when Bernard Jauréguiberry, the French Minister of Marine, requested proposals for the ships. The naval engineer Louis de Bussy submitted his plan on 6 May, which carried its main battery of four 340 mm (13.4 in) guns in a pair of gun turrets arranged en echelon amidships. It also dispensed with the complete waterline belt armor used in previous French designs and adopted the shorter but stronger armored citadel system; both aspects of the design were stark departures from French ships and more closely resembled the British ironclad HMS Inflexible. In addition, de Bussy chose a three-shaft arrangement for the propulsion system, as a single screw propeller was insufficient for large warships and previous vessels with two screws were found to steer badly.

The Conseil des travaux considered de Bussy's proposal from 27 to 30 May 1882, and the armor layout was quickly agreed upon, but the use of enclosed, armored gun turrets proved to be more controversial. De Bussy noted that open barbettes could be used instead, but cautioned against it, as he viewed these unprotected mountings to be far too vulnerable and he discounted the perceived benefit of improved visibility for the gun crews. The issue was ultimately settled by a tie-breaking vote from Jauréguiberry on 29 July in favor of the armored turrets. Soon thereafter, Jauréguiberry decided to begin construction of the ships, which he formally ordered on 8 August. Over the following months, de Bussy prepared a series of more detailed plans, beginning with the hull lines on 6 September, followed by other details in November and December.

=== Characteristics of de Bussy's design ===
The first design called for a ship that was 105 m (344 ft 6 in) long at the waterline, with a beam of 19.36 m (63 ft 6 in) and an average draft of 7.55 m (24 ft 9 in) (which increased to its maximum of 8 m (26 ft 3 in) at the stern). Displacement was set at 9,742 metric tons (9,588 long tons; 10,739 short tons). Each vessel would have been fitted with a pair of heavy military masts, and no sailing rig. The ship would have had a crew of 500 officers and enlisted men.

A trio of vertical triple-expansion steam engines provided propulsion, with steam supplied by twelve coal-fired fire-tube boilers. The boilers were divided into four boiler rooms and were vented through a pair of funnels. The propulsion system was rated to produce 10,350 indicated horsepower (7,720 kW) for a top speed of 17 knots (31 km/h; 20 mph), which was sufficient to match the fast, but lightly protected, Italian ironclads. Charles Martel and Brennus would have carried 900 t (890 long tons; 990 short tons) of coal, allowing them to steam for an estimated 5,000 nautical miles (9,300 km; 5,800 mi) at a speed of 10 knots (19 km/h; 12 mph).

The main battery consisted of the four 340 mm guns in two twin turrets. The en echelon arrangement allowed both turrets to fire directly ahead or astern, and they could be trained across the decks to permit all four guns to be fired to either broadside over limited arcs. A secondary battery of eight 138.6 mm (5.46 in) guns was to be installed, four of which were in twin barbette mounts, both on the centerline at either ends of the ship. Of these weapons, six could fire to either broadside, while four could be trained ahead or astern. Close-range defense against torpedo boats was provided by an unknown number of 37 mm (1.5 in) Hotchkiss revolver cannon, of which eight would have been carried in fighting tops on the masts. Additional such guns would have been distributed along the superstructure. The armament suite was rounded out with a pair of torpedo tubes that would have been mounted in the hull abreast the main battery turrets, one per side.

The ships would have been protected with either steel or compound armor, depending on the contractor that would have been selected for the ships. Their waterline belt armor would have been 450 mm (17.7 in) thick, with curved, transverse bulkheads of the same thickness connecting both ends. The citadel would have been 50.8 m (166 ft 8 in) in length, nearly half the length of the ship. The side armor extended from 1.6 m (5 ft 3 in) above the waterline to 1 m (3 ft 3 in) below. This was reinforced by a pair of armor decks. The first connected to the bottom of the citadel; it was 20 mm (0.79 in) thick under the citadel, and increased to 75 mm (3 in) at either end. The upper deck was 100 mm (3.9 in) thick at the top of the citadel, but decreased significantly to 16 mm (0.63 in) at the bow and stern. Side armor above the waterline at either end amounted to 150 mm (5.9 in). Both ends of the ship would have been highly subdivided into watertight compartments to contain flooding in the event of battle damage, and they would have been filled with some 500 t (490 long tons; 550 short tons) of coal for additional resistance to incoming projectiles. The ships' main battery turrets were to receive 400 mm (15.7 in) of armor on their sides and bases.

== Second proposal ==
Marceau, which provided the basis of the Charles Martel design

The decision to revise the Charles Martel design originated with the decision to add a third vessel for the 1883 budget and a fourth for the 1884 year. A new naval minister, Charles Brun, disagreed with the turret ship concept and on 29 June 1883 he requested advice from the Conseil des travaux whether this fourth vessel should repeat de Bussy's design or be altered in some way. By that time, opinions in the board had shifted, and they recommended a complete waterline belt, in keeping with previous French practice. The ship was ultimately canceled due to budgetary limitations, and no effort was made to alter the Charles Martel class at that time. But already by September, Brun had been replaced by Vice Admiral Alexandre Peyron, who on the 18th suspended the contracts for all three ships and solicited input from the Conseil on whether to complete them as originally designed or to revise them to follow the Marceau pattern.

The Conseill responded on 23 October with a recommendation to adopt an improved Marceau design, which would be lengthened to improve hydrodynamic efficiency and a straight bow, rather than the sloped ram bow that was to cause problems for the Marceaus once they entered service. Like the earlier vessels, this new version mounted its four 340 mm guns in individual barbettes in a lozenge pattern. Four days later, Peyron asked Charles Ernest Huin, who had designed the Marceaus and Hoche, to refine the concept for the new ships. Huin completed the initial draft on 17 November, but further alterations were suggested and his revised plan was submitted on 22 January 1884. Yet more improvements were requested, including moving the wing barbettes to improve their fields of fire (and reduce their blast effects on the forward and rear guns). Huin's finalalized design was completed by 31 July.

=== Characteristics of Huin's design ===
Huin's revised design lengthened the ships slightly, to 105.5 m (346 ft 2 in) long between perpendiculars and 107.6 m (353 ft) long overall. Their beam increased to 20.25 m (66 ft 5 in) and average draft grew to 8 m (26 ft 3 in), up to 8.3 m (27 ft) at the stern. Displacement rose to 10,649.5 t (10,481.3 long tons; 11,739.1 short tons). Their hulls would have been constructed with steel. The conning tower was placed amidships, astern of the funnel, which greatly hampered the view forward from the primary steering position. As a result, a smaller, temporary conning position was to be added during peacetime operations. They were to be equipped with a pair of light pole masts fitted with fighting tops. The ships' crew fell to 450 officers and enlisted men.

Huin's design reverted to a two-shaft arrangement, but the specific type of steam engine to have been used is unknown. The firm Indret was planned to supply the engines. Eight coal-fired boilers provided steam, and they would have been vented through a single large funnel placed forward of amidships. Expected top speed would have been 16.4 knots (30.4 km/h; 18.9 mph). Coal storage amounted to 600 t (590 long tons; 660 short tons), which was projected to provide a cruising radius of 2,900 nautical miles (5,400 km; 3,300 mi) at a more economical speed of 10 knots (19 km/h; 12 mph). To supplement the steam engines on longer voyages, the ships would have been equipped with a schooner sailing rig.

The ships' primary armament was to have consisted of four 340 mm M1881 guns, which were 28.5-caliber weapons; they were carried in individual mounts in the French lozenge arrangement. The guns fired 350 kg (770 lb) high-explosive shells filled with melinite with a muzzle velocity of 555 m/s (1,820 ft/s). These would have been supported by a secondary battery of seventeen 138.6 mm (5.46 in) guns in individual casemate mounts; one was to have been placed in the bow and the remainder distributed along the broadside. These likely would have been the 30-caliber M1881 version of the gun. Close-range defense against torpedo boats would have been provided by fourteen 37 mm Hotchkiss revolver cannon. Lastly, they would have been fitted with three 356 mm (14 in) torpedo tubes, one at the stern and one on each side, astern of the wing barbettes. They would have been placed above water, below the secondary battery. The M1880 torpedo would have been used.

As with de Bussy's design, the armor plate for Huin's ships would have either been steel or compound armor. The belt armor was to be 450 mm (17.7 in) in the central portion of the ship, tapering down to 300 mm (11.8 in) toward the bow and stern. The belt was narrower on the new design, extending from 1.65 m (5 ft 5 in) above the waterline to 0.65 m (2 ft 2 in) below. An armor deck that was a uniform 80 mm (3.1 in) thick was originally planned, but in 1885, it was revised to 70 mm (2.8 in). The barbettes were to receive 350 mm (13.8 in) of armor plate, and the guns would have received splinter-proof hoods.

== Construction, cancellation, and aftermath ==
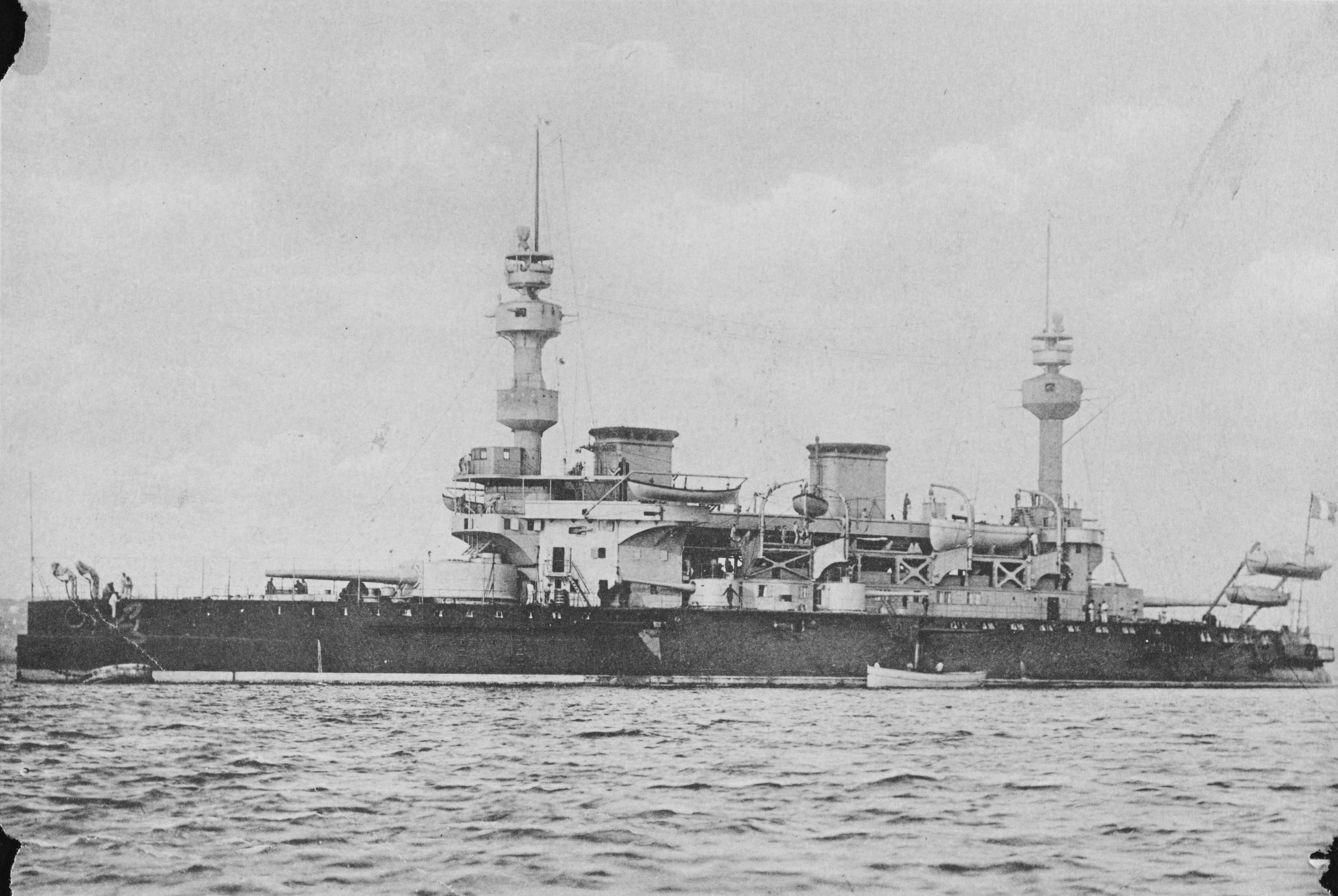
The second Brennus, sometimes believed to be the same vessel as the Charles Martel-class ship

The exact timeline for the design and construction of the ships have been unclear due to the numerous stopping and restarting of work as the designs were altered, replaced, and modified again. Various sources have reported differing dates over the years. According to the naval historian Theodore Ropp, the decision to cancel the vessels had been made in late 1884, during the tenure of Admiral Alexandre Peyron; while he was not a partisan of the Jeune École, he was also not convinced that further battleship construction was warranted during a period of technological uncertainty. He remained committed to completing the Marceau class and Hoche, as they were already well advanced in construction, but was unwilling to authorize construction of any new vessels. The historian Stephen Roberts provides a different justification for Peyron's actions, noting that he simply did not agree with de Bussy's design, and preferred one based on Huin's Marceau class. Furthermore, the project was not canceled altogether, simply deferred long enough for Huin to prepare an acceptable alternative.

Roberts states that the finalized design was submitted on 4 March 1884 and approved by Peyron eight days later.. But according to the historians John Jordan and Philip Caresse, Huin's design was not approved until January 1885 and work on the two ships, Charles Martel and Brennus, began that year in Toulon and Lorient, respectively. Robert, however, states that work had begun with the keel laying for Brennus on 2 January 1885. Confusingly, Thomas Brassey, writing in the contemporary The Naval Annual, noted that the ships had been ordered in 1882 and that at least some work on the keel for Brennus had already been completed by October 1884, though Charles Martel had not yet been laid down. Regardless of the specific timeline, there is agreement that it was Admiral Théophile Aube, who became the Minister of Marine in January 1886, and who immediately suspended work on the new ships upon becoming the naval minister. Aube was a proponent of the Jeune École (Young School), which held that cheap torpedo boats could effectively replace the capital ships that had been the primary component of naval power. By the time Aube cancelled the ships, some work had been completed assembling the lower hull of Brennus, but very little work had started on Charles Martel.

In 1887, Aube left the ministry and his replacement, Édouard Barbey, disagreed with his predecessor over the future composition of the French fleet. Huin suggested reworking the design for Brennus, which Barbey accepted, resulting in France's first pre-dreadnought battleship, Brennus. There is some confusion as to the ship's fate. Jordan and Caresse seem to indicate that the two vessels were one and the same, stating that "work on the partially built Brennus resumed in 1889." But in another publication, Caresse provides a new keel-laying date for Brennus on 2 January 1889, and Brassey indicates the two were different vessels. (Note: Brassey quotes a French report that states, "Had these plans [for the original Brennus] been adopted, we should have had a vessel no longer equal to the requirements that have arisen since she was first designed. However regrettable the loss of some thousands of pounds may be, the minister determined to call upon the constructors for a vessel answering in every respect the latest requirements.) Speaking of Charles Martel, the historian Luc Feron states more plainly, instructing readers to "[not] confuse this one with the 12,000-ton battleship of the 1890 program which was actually built." Nevertheless, some of the material that had been accumulated for Brennus was later reused in the battleship that was actually completed. Charles Martel was scrapped in Toulon and some of her components were reused in the later battleships Carnot and Bouvet, among other projects. Her name was reused in the later battleship Charles Martel, also designed by Huin.

== Ships of the class ==
Name	Builder	Budget	Ordered	Laid down	Cancelled
Brennus	Arsenal de Lorient	1882	25 November 1881	2 January 1885	27 January 1886
Charles Martel	Arsenal de Toulon	1882	25 November 1881	1885	27 January 1886
Unnamed	—	1883	—	—	—
Unnamed	Arsenal de Brest	1884	—	—	—
