= Ghaleb =

Ghaleb is a given name. Notable people with the name include:

- Ghaleb Awwali, Lebanese Islamic Jihad official assassinated in a car bombing in Beirut in 2004
- Ghaleb Moussa Abdalla Bader (born 1951), Jordanian Roman Catholic bishop, Archbishop emeritus of the Roman Catholic Archdiocese of Algiers
- Ghaleb Barakat (1927–2014), Jordanian politician and diplomat
- Ghaleb Bencheikh (born 1960), Doctor of Science and physics from Jeddah, Saudi Arabia
- Ibrahim Ghaleb (born 1990), Saudi Arabian footballer
- Mohammed Murad Ghaleb (1922–2007), Egyptian politician and diplomat who studied medicine at Cairo University
- Seifollah Ghaleb (born 1916), Egyptian sports shooter
- Ali Ghaleb Himmat (born 1938), Italian businessman
- Ghaleb Husseini, Chemical Engineering professor at the American University of Sharjah
- Ghaleb Majadele (born 1953), Israeli Arab politician
- Ghaleb Rida (born 1981), professional Lebanese basketball player
- Ghaleb Zubi (born 1943), Jordanian lawyer and politician in the Hashemite Kingdom of Jordan

== See also ==
- Mit Abou Ghaleb, a village in Damietta Governorate, Egypt
- Sarollah Shah-e Ghaleb, a village in Khuzestan Province, Iran
- Shah Ghaleb, a village in Boyer-Ahmad Province, Iran
- Galeb (disambiguation)
- Ghale
