= French ironclad floating battery Arrogante =

History

France
- Name: Arrogante
- Ordered: September 1861
- Builder: Ernest Goüin et Cie., Nantes
- Laid down: 20 March 1862
- Launched: 26 June 1864
- Completed: January 1866
- Reclassified: As a training ship, 5 July 1877; Hulked, 1884
- Stricken: 30 December 1884
- Fate: Sunk as a target, September 1898

General characteristics (as built)
- Class & type: Arrogante-class ironclad floating battery
- Displacement: 1,440 t (1,420 long tons)
- Length: 44.08 m (144 ft 7 in)
- Beam: 14.76 m (48 ft 5 in)
- Draft: 2.94 m (9.6 ft)
- Installed power: 4 boilers; 480 ihp (360 kW)
- Propulsion: 2 propellers, 2 steam engines
- Sail plan: Fore-and-aft rig
- Speed: 7 knots (13 km/h; 8.1 mph)
- Range: 272 nmi (504 km; 313 mi) at 5.9 knots (10.9 km/h; 6.8 mph)
- Complement: 200
- Armament: 4 × 164.7 mm (6.48 in) Mle 1864 guns; 5 or 6 × 164.7 mm Mle 1858-60 guns
- Armor: Waterline belt: 120 mm (4.7 in); Battery: 110 mm (4.3 in)

Arrogante was a Arrogante-class ironclad floating battery built for the French Navy during the 1860s. Completed in 1866, she was immediately placed in reserve although she was briefly commissioned during the Franco-Prussian War of 1870–1871.

== Bibliography ==
- de Balincourt, Captain & Vincent-Bréchignac, Captain (1973). "French Floating Batteries". F.P.D.S. Newsletter. I (2): 13–20. OCLC 41554533.
- Caruana, J. & Koehler, R. B. (1996). "Question 7/95: French Ironclad Floating Batteries". Warship International. XXXIII (4): 416–418. ISSN 0043-0374.
- Gille, Eric (1999). Cent ans de cuirassés français [A Century of French Battleships] (in French). Nantes: Marines. ISBN 2-909-675-50-5.
- Roberts, Stephen S. (2021). French Warships in the Age of Steam 1859–1914: Design, Construction, Careers and Fates. Barnsley, UK: Seaforth Publishing. ISBN 978-1-5267-4533-0.
- Roche, Jean-Michel (2005). Dictionnaire des bâtiments de la flotte de guerre française de Colbert à nos jours [Dictionary of French Warships from Colbert to Today] (in French). Vol. Tome I: 1671–1870. Toulon: Roche. ISBN 978-2-9525917-0-6. OCLC 165892922.
