= Empain-Schneider =

Franco-Belgian industrial group (1963–1999)

Empain-Schneider was a Franco-Belgian industrial group formed in the 1960s from the merger of Belgium's Empain group and France's Schneider & Cie. In 1980, it was renamed Schneider SA. Throughout the 1980s and 1990s, the group was comprehensively restructured and sold most of its historic activities while acquiring operations linked to electrical equipment, leading up to its renaming in 1999 as Schneider Electric.

== History ==
In 1963, the Empain group acquired control of Schneider & Cie from the Schneider family, following the untimely death in 1960 of Charles Schneider. Despite economic-nationalistic misgivings from France's president Charles de Gaulle, the two groups gradually integrated their operations and structures in the following decade:

- Electrical and mechanical engineering: in 1964, Empain's Forges et ateliers de constructions électriques de Jeumont (est. 1898) and Schneider's Le Matériel Électrique Schneider-Westinghouse (est. 1929), merged to form Jeumont-Schneider;
- Banking: in 1967, Empain's Banque parisienne pour l'industrie and Schneider's Union Européenne Industrielle et Financière (UEIF, est. 1920), merged to form the Banque de l'Union Européenne (BUE), headquartered at 4, rue Gaillon in Paris;
- Holding entities: in 1969, Empain group and Schneider & Cie merged to form Empain-Schneider;
- Construction: In 1972, Empain's Spie Batignolles (formed in 1968 by merger of its own Société Parisienne pour l’Industrie Electrique, est. 1902, with the Société de Construction des Batignolles, est. 1846, in which it had gradually increased its stake since 1954) absorbed Schneider's Compagnie industrielle de travaux.

Schneider's historic steelmaking subsidiary, the Société des Forges et Ateliers du Creusot (SFAC), merged in 1970 with the Compagnie des Ateliers et Forges de la Loire to form Creusot-Loire.

In nuclear engineering, Schneider, via the SFAC, had been a major stakeholder of Framatome since its creation in 1958, and became its dominant shareholder in 1976 by acquiring the 15-percent stake previously held by Westinghouse Electric Corporation.

In 1980, the Empain family sold most of its stake, and the holding entity, by then led by Didier Pineau-Valencienne who had worked in the Empain Group since 1958, was renamed Schneider SA to signal its newly predominant French identity. In 1981, Paribas became Schneider's controlling shareholder. In 1983 the group's bank, the BUE, was acquired by Crédit Industriel et Commercial. Creusot-Loire went into insolvency in 1984 and subsequently left the Schneider group's scope. Between 1986 and 1992, much of Jeumont-Schneider was sold in parts to Alstom, Bosch, and Framatome. Meanwhile, Schneider acquired Télémécanique in 1988, Square D in 1991 through a hostile takeover, and in 1992, full ownership of Merlin Gerin (est. 1920) in which it had held a stake since 1975. Spie Batignolles was divested in 1996, largely completing Schneider's transformation from conglomerate to a global manufacturing company focused on electrical equipment. In 1999, the company was correspondingly renamed Schneider Electric.

Electrorail, formerly a major holding company within the Empain group galaxy, remained traded on the Brussels Stock Exchange until delisting in 2003. Its former head office (French: Siège d'Électrorail) is a noted art deco building in Brussels.

== See also ==
- De Wendel family

== Sources ==
- "Schneider S.A.", International Directory of Company Histories, vol. II, 18, 19, 108, The Gale Group, Inc.
- "Group Schneider S.A.", International Directory of Company Histories, vol. 20, The Gale Group, Inc.
