= Banque des Pays du Nord =

Former French bank

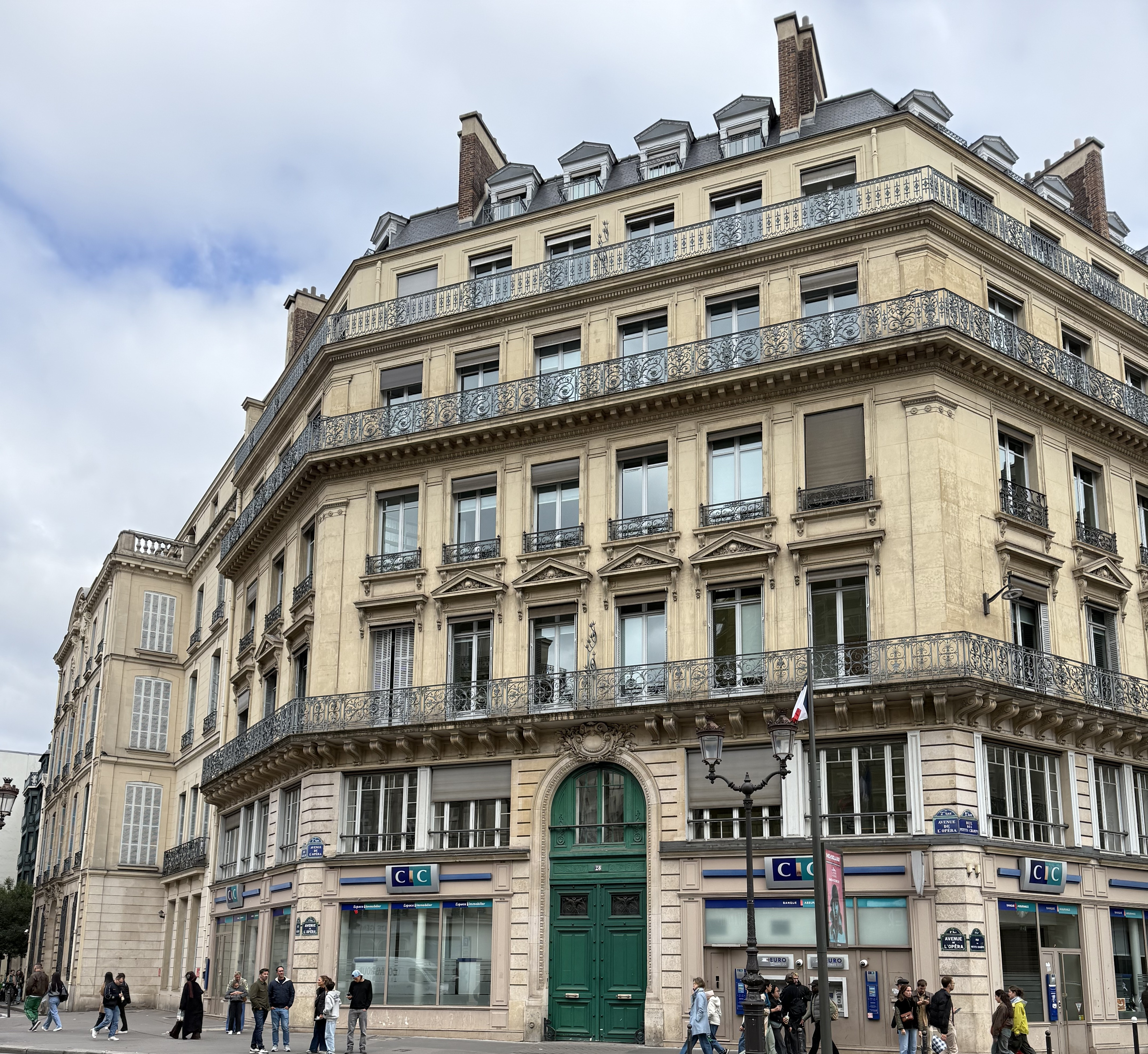
- Former head office of the BPN / UEIF / BUE at 28, avenue de l'Opéra in Paris, with the 18th-century Hôtel Sulkowski visible on the left; lately Parisian head office of Crédit Mutuel Alliance Fédérale
- Industry: Financial services
- Founded: February 14, 1911
- Founders: Danish and Swedish financiers
- Defunct: 1983
- Fate: Absorbed
- Successor: Crédit Industriel et Commercial (CIC)
- Headquarters: Paris, France
- Area served: Northern European countries
- Products: Banking services

The Banque des Pays du Nord (BPN, lit. "Bank of the Northern Countries") was a bank headquartered in Paris, France, originally established in 1911 on the initiative of leading Danish and Swedish financiers.

In 1943, it merged into the Union Européenne Industrielle et Financière (UEIF, lit. "European Industrial and Financial Union"), an investment bank established in Paris in 1920. The resulting entity was restructured in 1968, rebranded in 1970 as the Banque de l'Union Européenne (BUE, lit. "Bank of the European Union"), nationalized in 1982, acquired in 1983 by Paris-based Crédit Industriel et Commercial (CIC), and fully absorbed by the latter in 1990.

== History ==
=== Banque des Pays du Nord ===
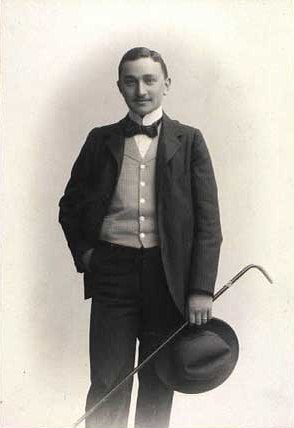
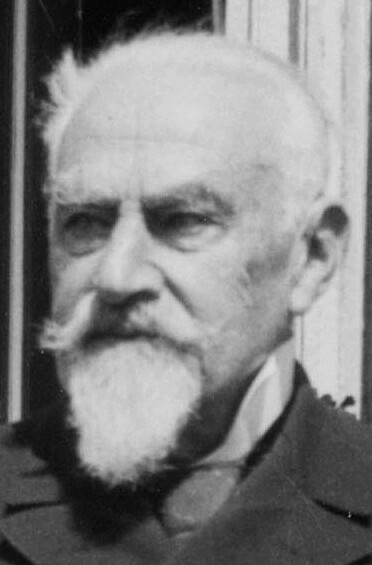
Emil Glückstadt and Knut Agathon Wallenberg were instrumental in the creation of the BPN in 1911, and of its London counterpart the British Bank of Northern Commerce in 1912.

The BPN was founded on 14 February 1911 by Denmark's Landmandsbanken, Norway's Centralbanken for Norge, and Sweden's Stockholms Enskilda Bank, together with Hoskier Bank and Hambros Bank. It targeted a wealthy French clientele, for which it leveraged its prestigious head office at 28, avenue de l'Opéra and adjacent 4-6, rue Gaillon.

The Schneider-Creusot financial group acquired control of the BPN in 1929, following the deterioration of its prior privileged links with the rival Banque de l'Union Parisienne. It initially kept it separate from the UEIF, its other investment banking affiliate.

=== Union Européenne Industrielle et Financière ===
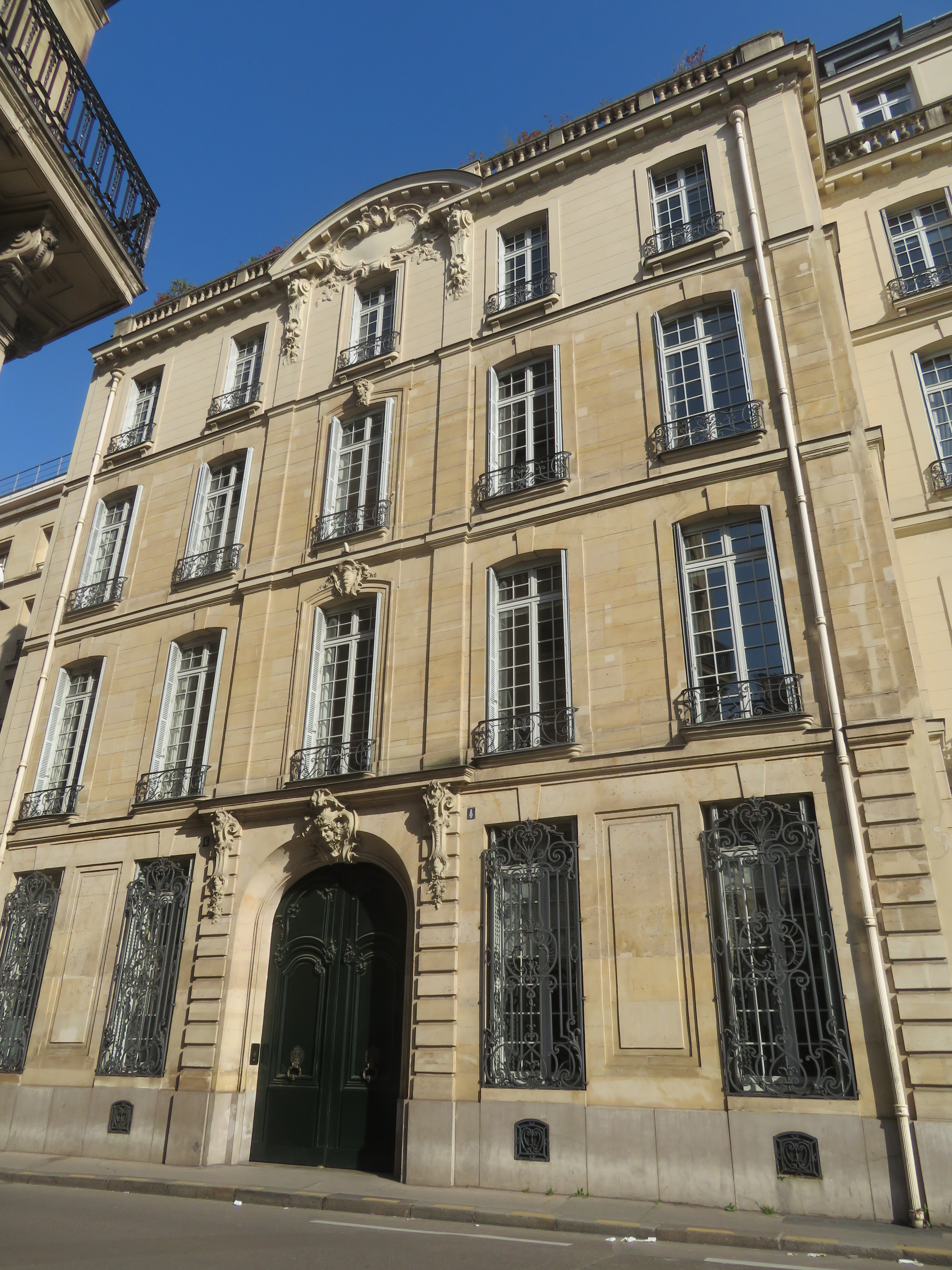
Hôtel Sulkowski at 4-6, rue Gaillon in Paris, part of the BPN / UEIF / BUE head office complex. The urban mansion was erected around 1740 and subsequently inhabited by a member of the Sułkowski family, with a third floor added in the early 1880s.

The UEIF was originally established in 1920 by Eugène Schneider II in partnership with the Banque de l'Union Parisienne and the Empain group in relation with their business interests in the Little Entente countries, especially Czechoslovakia. Following the Munich Agreement of September 1938, however, the UEIF's strategy lost its purpose and the bank had to liquidate its investments in central Europe, thus acquiring the resources to buy out the BPN in 1943.

UEIF became an investment bank (French: banque d'affaires) in 1946 and in 1950 absorbed Énergie Électrique Rhône et Jura, a portfolio investment company. Despite the European reference in its name, most of UEIF's investments by that time were in France and French colonies. It started expanding into the rest of Europe in the 1960s.

=== Banque de l'Union Européenne ===
In 1967–1968, the Empain group, which had acquired Schneider in 1963, merged its own French banking affiliate the Banque parisienne pour l'industrie with UEIF to form the Banque de l'Union européenne industrielle et financière, which in 1970 was renamed the Banque de l'Union Européenne (BUE). The BUE was designed as a deposit bank, while a separate institution, Union Internationale de Financement et de Participation or Interunion, was established in February 1969 as a long-term credit bank. Through the restructuring, Marine Midland Bank, the Bank of Brussels, Basler Handelsbank, Bayerische Vereinsbank, Hambros Bank, and Mees & Hope became minority shareholders of the BUE, as did financial investment groups Centrale Finanziara Generale and Société Financière Internationale Desmarais pour l'Industrie et le Commerce (known as FIDIC). The BUE subsequently developed the provision of trade finance through its relationships with other entities of the Empain-Schneider group such as Creusot-Loire, Framatome, Ateliers et Chantiers de France, and Spie Batignolles.

Vincent Bolloré started his business career as a junior employee of the BUE in the early 1970s.

=== Nationalization and absorption by the Crédit Industriel et Commercial ===
In 1982, the BUE was nationalized together with the rest of France's banking sector. By then, it had come under distress due to adverse foreign-exchange developments. It was subsequently absorbed by CIC, of which it represented about a fifth of total consolidated assets. Following renewed losses, it was fully absorbed by CIC in 1990.

== See also ==
- Charles François Laurent
- Pierre de Lauzun
- French–Polish Rail Association
- List of banks in France
