= Menasce =

Menasce and de Menasce is a surname derived from Menasheh (Manasses). It may refer to:

== People ==
- Daniel Menasce, American engineer
- Félix de Menasce, Baron (1865–1943), Egyptian Jewish community leader and banker involved in the Compagnie des chemins économiques de l'Est égyptien
- Jacques de Menasce (1905-1960), Austrian & US musician
- Jean de Menasce (1902–1973), French priest (convert from Judaism), author and academic

== Other ==
- Menasce Synagogue, Alexandria, Egypt
