= Banque Empain =

Former bank in Belgium

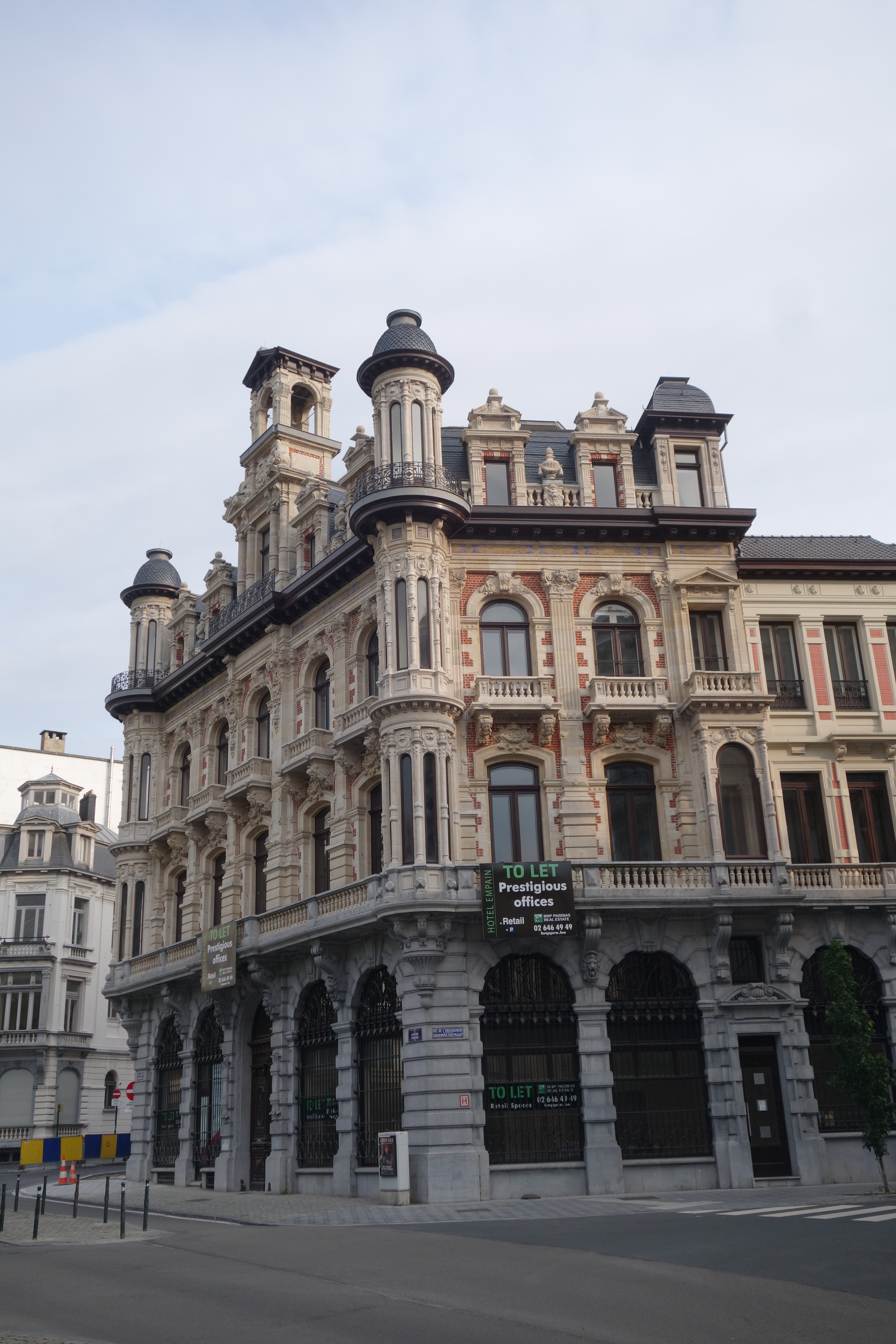
- Former head office of the Banque Empain, then Banque Industrielle Belge at rue de la Liberté 33 in Brussels
- Type: Private company
- Industry: Financial services
- Founded: 1881
- Founder: Édouard Empain
- Defunct: 1961
- Fate: Absorbed
- Successor: Banque Lambert
- Headquarters: Brussels, Belgium
- Area served: Belgium
- Products: Investment banking

The Banque Empain or Banque Édouard-Louis-Joseph Empain was an investment bank based in Brussels, Belgium. It was founded in 1881 by entrepreneur Édouard Empain as a holder for his equity stakes in multiple infrastructure and industrial ventures, in Belgium and abroad.

In 1920 it was renamed as the Banque Industrielle Belge (lit. 'Belgian Industrial Bank', BIB). Its banking operations were eventually absorbed by the Banque Lambert in 1961.

== History ==
From its start in 1881, the Banque Empain was located on Place de la Liberté in Brussels. The eclectic building was erected two years earlier by landowner Hector De Knuyt as part of the reconstruction of the Freedom Quarter, on a design by architect Joseph Naert, and is still referred to as the hôtel de Knuyt de Vosmaer. In 1884, Empain also relocated his personal residence in the building.

Stars were added on the building's exterior in the early 20th century, after Édouard Empain became associated with the Belgian Congo. The star had been selected by Leopold II as an emblem first of its International African Association in the late 1870s, then of his Congo Free State. En 1902, Leopold leaned on Empain for the financing of railways in the Free State, for which Empain founded the Compagnie du chemin de fer du Congo supérieur aux Grands Lacs africains (CFL). Leopold ennobled Empain in 1907 as a baron, in recognition of his contribution to what was then referred to as Congo's economic development.

In 1919, Édouard Empain reorganized his bank as a joint-stock company owned jointly with his brother François Empain, and in which Édouard owned a 70 percent equity stake. The bank was subsequently renamed as Banque Industrielle Belge in 1920.

Around 1930, Édouard's son Jean Empain, who had become the group's leader following his father's death in 1929, rebuilt the adjacent property to the head office, at rue de l'Enseignement 91, subsequently also known as the Hôtel Empain. By early 1935, the BIB was formally registered at that address. The same building hosted the Brussels office of the Compagnie Belge d'Entreprises Minières or Cobelmin, a joint venture formed in 1931 by Empain together with the Société Minière de la Tele (itself an affiliate of Forminière) for mining exploration in the CFL concession area.

In the mid-1930s, new Belgian legislation forced the separation of depositary banks from holding companies. On 3 December 1935, the BIB became a holding company and renamed itself "Fédération d'entreprises industrielles (anciennement E. L. J. Empain)". Its banking assets and liabilities were transferred to a separate entity, subsequently known as the BIB and formally named "Banque Industrielle Belge (anciennement Banque E. L. J. Empain)". By the late 1930s, its customer base was mainly companies affiliated with the Empain Group and connected families.

In the 1950s, that core customer base eroded, even though by 1958 the BIB was still active enough to promote itself on free maps of the Expo 58 in Brussels. The BIB sold its remaining banking operations to the Banque Lambert, and subsequently renamed itself as "Financière Empain" on 24 February 1961, then "Financière auxiliaire de la Fédération d'entreprises industrielles" later in the 1960s.

The bank's former building on Place de la Liberté reopened in 2020 following a seven-years renovation.

== See also ==
- List of banks in Belgium
