= Compagnie des chemins économiques de l'Est égyptien =

Egyptian railway company

Coordinates: 31°2′26″N 30°28′12″E

Compagnie des chemins économiques de l’Est égyptien
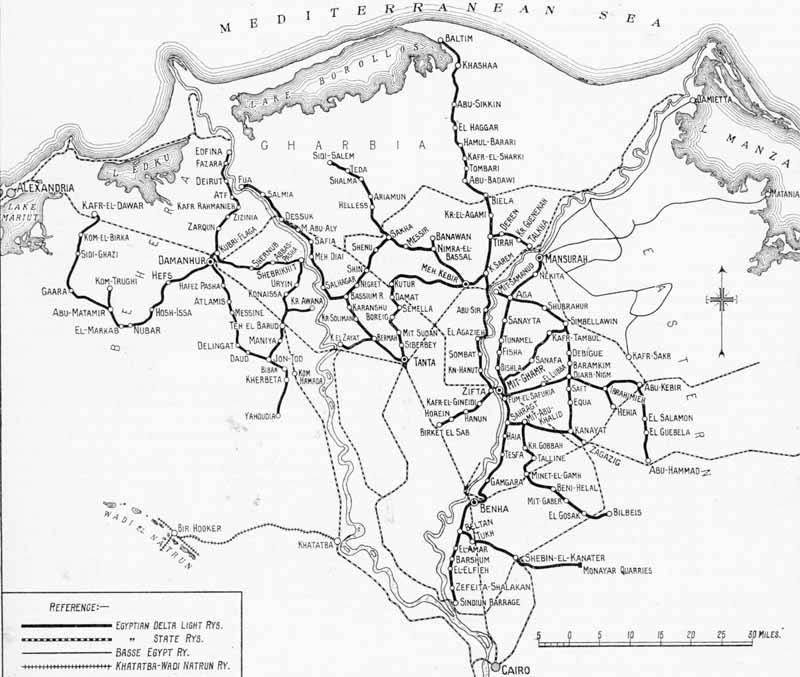
- Railway lines in Egypt, around 1915

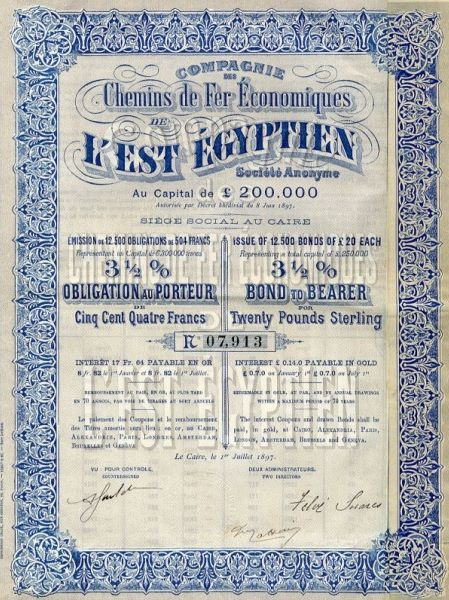
- Stock exchange certificate for Compagnie des chemins de fer économiques de l'Est égyptien, 1 July 1897

Technical
- Track gauge: 1000 mm (3 ft 3⅜ in)
- Length: 350 km (220 mi)

The Compagnie des chemins économiques de l’Est égyptien (French for Economic Railway Company of the Egyptian East) built and briefly operated a 350 km (220 mi) long 1,000 mm (3 ft 3 3/8 in) gauge railway network around Damanhur and Tanta in Egypt.^{§ 51}

== History ==
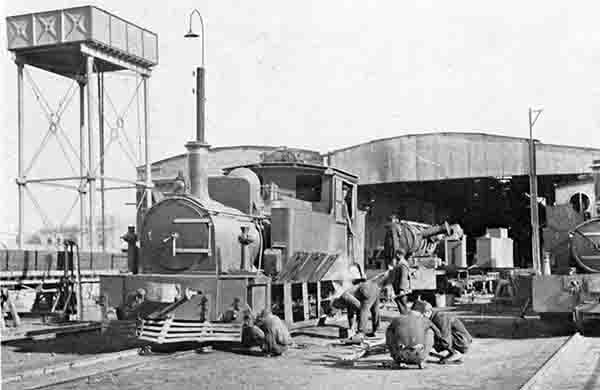
Bagnall 4-4-0T No 8 at the Tanta workshops

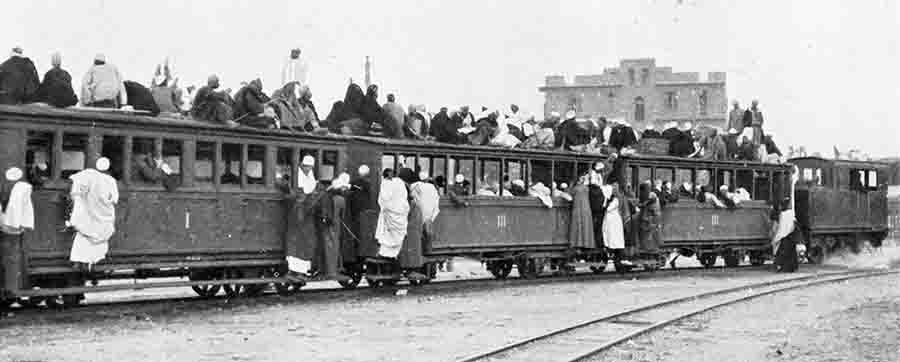
A Sentinel 0-4-0T with a passenger train departing Damanhur

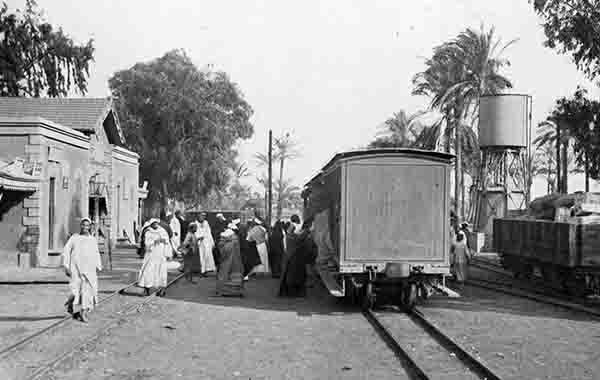
Mit-Abu-Khaled station between Sahragt and Zagazig

The Compagnie des chemins économiques de l’Est égyptien was founded on 19 May 1897 by the Belgian aristocrat Édouard Empain (born 1852; died 1929) as a PLC. ^{§ 34} The French business bank Paribas was not one of the co-founders, but got involved by replacing the group of German investors, who had teamed-up with the Empain Group and three local banks on previous occasions. The concession was given to the banks of the Suarès brothers, Félix de Menasce, Cattaui and Wilhelm Pelizaeus. They divided the fully paid-in capital of 200,000 Pound Sterling (5,040,000 French Franc) in shares of 55, 20, 15 und 10%, respectively.^{§ 50}

The Egyptian government granted the concession for 70 years, after which the railway had to be handed over to the State. It guaranteed for the investors a net income of 900 F/km. Half of the total income of 5,625 F per year and kilometre was due to be given to the government. The Paribas bank signed for a quarter of the capital, which was shared amongst the founders proportionally and elected a Member of the Board. ^{§ 51}

The railway company issued 12,500 stock exchange certificates at 3.5% of the total capital, i.e. 20 GBP (504 F) each, to be paid back within 70 years. The Paribas bank purchased shares at the value of 446.25 F and re-sold them at the same price to the public withholding a 4% premium. From a political point of view, this was one of the best concessions of Lower-Egypt and increased the French influence onto the region. The guaranteed annual net income of 315,000 F for the 350 km of railway track, promised to provide a profitable margin in comparison to the 242,304 F investment. ^{§ 52} The results exceeded the most optimistic prognoses of the founders, which led to an increase of capital to 8,125,000 F in March 1900. The new 100 F shares were issued at 106,25 F, to gain 3,320,300 F. A quarter of the first and second tranche of the shares and all loans were sold in France at a total of 7,674,141 F. ^{§ 53}

The company merged with Egyptian Delta Light Railways Company in April 1900 by exchanging shares. The Paribas bank left the company and was not affiliated to the Egyptian Delta Light Railways. ^{§ 54}

== Lines and stations ==
=== 100. Damanhur — El-Tod — Teh-el-Barud ===
- Damanhur
- Haganaya
- Hafez Pasha
- Abu—Massoud
- Atlamis
- Messin
- Manshiet el Shorafa
- Ittehad

→ Kom Feryn (branch, goods only)

- Ahmed Pasha Sadek
- Delingat
- Daud
- Abu-Samadi
- El-Tod (Jonction El-Tod)
- Riaz Pasha
- Nagouri
- Maania
- Teh-el-Barud (48 km off Damanhur)

=== 101. El-Tod — El Delengat ===
- El-Tod (see 100)
- Biban
  - Kom Hamada (new alignment from 1927)
- Kherbeta
- Dest
- Haddein
- Kafr-Ziada
- Wafaleh (22 km off Tod)
- Kobour-el-Omara
- Derchai
- Abou-Coucha
- El Delengat (see 100)

=== 102. Damanhur — Kafr-el-Dawar ===
- Damanhur (see 100)
- Shoka Road
- Fadel Pasha
- Ezbet Salama
- Nédiba
- Hefs
- El Shousha
- Kom-el-Akhdar
- Momtaz
- El Sharika
- Hosh Issa
- El-Riko
- Ezbet-Neguilah
- Nubar
- El-Markeb
- Abu-el-Matamir

→ Kom-Truca (branch, goods only, 7 km)

- Ghandoura
- Gheta
- Kom-Abu-el-Eda
- Gaara
- Kom-el-Hanash
- Masraf Nubarieh
- Omadieh (Sidi Ghazi Behera)
- Ezbet Dawar
- Kom-el-Birka
- Ezbet Rafia
- Wastaniya
- Kafr-el-Dawar abc (77 km off Damanhur)

=== 103. Damanhur — Shibrikhit — Teh-el-Barud Ville ===
- Damanhur (see 100)
- Shazli Pashasee
- Kubri Flaga
- Abu Rish
- Karakis
- Ebet-el-Wost
- Ezbet Dorbok
- Ezbet Salanikla
- Shernoub
- Masraf Emri
- Lacanah
- Abbas-Pasha
- Ezbet-Beshara
- Ezbet-el-Sherif
- Ezbet-Youssef Bey
- Shibrikhit (29 km off Damanhur)
- Kafr Mustanad
- Ouryin
- Konaissa Behera
- Kafr Askar
- Saft-Khaled
- Jonction Shandeed
- Teh-el-Barud Ville (49 km off Damanhur)

=== 104. Shibrikhit — Miniet Salamah ===
- Shibrikhit (see 103)
- Jonction Shibrikhit
- Mehallet-Bechr
- Oum Hakeem
- Miniet Salamah

=== 105. Tel-el-Barud — Kafr Awana ===
- Tel-el-Barud Ville (see 103)
- Jonction Shandeed (see 102)
- Minieh
- Kafr Awana (7 km off Tel-el-Barud Ville)

=== 106. Damanhur — Edfina ===
- Damanhur (see 100)
- Kubri Flaga (see 103)
- Flaga
- Hassan Kheir
- Zarqun
- Moghazi Pasha
- Zizinia
- Kafr Rahmanieh
- Mahmoudia (Atf)

→ Atf Kom (branch, 1 km)

- Halk-el-Gamal
- Deirut Behera
- Miniet-e1-$ayed
- Fazara
- Edfina (34 km off Damanhur)

=== 107. Tanta — Sidi-Salem ===
- Tanta
- Mehallet-Marhoum
- Birmah
- Kafr-el-Arab
- Kafr-Suliman
- Karanshou
- Bassioun-Régulateur
- Kafr-Abou-Hamar
- Nigrit
- Shin
- Kafr—Mirazgha
- Menshieh
- Shenou
- Defrieh
- Sakha
- Kafr El Sheikh
- Kafr El Sheikh Market
- Mehallet-el-Kassab
- Heless
- Ariamoun
- Kafr Mufty El-Emden
- Shalma
- Manshiet Abbas
- Teda Bahari
- Kafr Mashargha
- Sidi-Salem (76 km off Tanta)

=== 108. Bassioun Régulateur — Fua ===
- Bassioun Régulateur (see 107)
- Bassioun
- Goddaba
- Salhagar
- Kafr el-Dawar et Ganag
- Miniet Ganag
- Mehallet-Diai
- Safia
- Kafr Magar
- Mehallet-Abu-Aly
- Gamgamun
- Kafr Ibrahim
- Dessuk
- Mehallet Malek
- Salmia
- Kabrit
- Mit Ashraf
- Alawi
- Fua (47 km von Bassioun Régulateur)

=== 109. Mehallet Malek — El-Asiefar ===
- Mehallet Malek (see 108)
- Kafr-Sudan
- Shabas-El-Malh
- El-Mandura
- El-Kassabi
- Ezbet-Khamis
- El-Asiefar

=== 110. Birmah — Kafr-el-Zaya ===
- Birmah (see 107)
- Mit-Ebiar
- Ebiar
- Mustapha Cherif
- Dalgamun
- Kafr-el-Zaya (14 km off Birmah)

=== 111. Tanta — Baltim ===
- Tanta (see 107)
- Kuhafa
- Siberbey
- Mit-Sudan
- Mehallet-Menouf
- Boreig
- Semella
- Damat
- Kutur
- Kotour Ville
- Beltag
- Samatay
- Mit-Sheikh
- Chagaeyieh
- Dar-el-Bakar
- Dawaklieh
- Mehalla-Kebir Ville
- Mehalla-Kebir Jonction
- Mehalla-Kebir Markaz
- Mehalla-Kebir
- Mehalla Kantara
- Beteena
- Kosarieh
- Kafr Sarem
- Mehallet Ziad
- Banoub
- Tira
- Kafr-el-Agami
- Biela
- Hazek
- Abu-Badawi
- Zaafaran
- Kafr-Sharki
- Hamul Barari
- El-Hagar
- Abu-Sekkin
- Ecluses de Brulos (Will's & Sons Halte)
- Khashaa
- Baltim (131 km off Tanta)

=== 112. Tira — Talkha ===
- Tira (see 111)
- Derin
- Nabaroh
- Kafr Guenenah
- Ezbet-Sursock
- Talkha (16 km off Tira)

=== 113. Sakha — Mehalla-Kebir ===
- Sakha (see 107)
- Siufi Bey
- Messir
- Madhoul
- Nimra-el-Bassal

→ Banawan (branch, 3 km)

- Mohtamadia
- Sandessis
- Mehalla-Kebir Jonction (29 km off Sakha, see 111)

=== 114. Kafr Sarem — Birket-el-Sab ===
- Kafr Sarem (see 111)
- Samanud (E.S.R.)
- Samanud Ville
- Mit-el-Nassara
- Abu-Sir Gharbia
- Bana, Abu-Sir
- Mit-Badr-Hallawa
- Shoubra-el-Yaman
- El-Agazieh
- Sombat
- Kafr-Hanout
- Kafr El Nekib
- Zifta-Barrage
- Zifta
- Kafr-Guineidi
- Damanhur-el-Wahsh
- Hanoun
- Abu-Sab
- Horein
- Kafr Alim
- Birket-el-Sab (58 km off Kafr Sarem)

=== 115. Barrage — Mansura ===
- Barrage
- Ezbet Messallem
- El Monira (Zefeita Chalakan)
- Shubra Shehab
- Sidkieh (El-Elfieh)
- Bareshoum
- El-Amar
- Imiay
- Beltan
- Mit Assem
- Benha
- Kafr Moes
- Gamgara
- Isneit
- Kafr Shokr
- Muhyi Bey
- Tesfa
- Saffein
- Hala
- Sahragt
- Massara
- Mit Naghi
- Foum-el-Safouria
- Foum-el-Bouhia
- Bishla
- Fisha
- Tonamel
- Shiwa
- Sanayta Dakahlia
- Dires
- Aga
- Nawasawel-Gheit
- Salaka
- Nekita
- Sandoub
- Mansura (107 km off Barrage)

=== 116. Beltan — Kafr-Hamza ===
- Beltan (see 115)
- Tukh
- Tukh (Passage a niveau)
- Moshtohor
- Manzalah
- El-Deir
- Shebin-el-Kanater

→ Abu Zabal, Mounayer Quarries (branch, goods only)

- Sursok
- Kafr-Hamza

=== 117. Sahragt — Zagazig ===
- Sahragt (see 115)
- Kafr-el-Shehid
- Mit-Abu-Khaled
- Miska
- Bayoum Dakahlia Helmia
- Nakhas
- Kafr-el-Ashraf
- Kanayat
- Sheeba
- Zagazig (34 km off Sahragt)

=== 118. Mit-Abu-Khaleb — Bilbeis — Abu-Hammad ===
- Mit-Abu-Khaleb (see 117, supposably Mit Abu Ghaleb)
- Mit-Yahiche
- Bogdadli Pasha
- Marawan
- Kafr-el-Gobah
- Kafr-el-Gobbah
- Abu Twala
- El-Tallein
- El-Malames
- Minet-el-Gamh
- Shalshalamon
- Beni-Helal
- Beni Saleh (Telbana)
- Mit-Gaber
- Shubra-el-Nakhla
- Mohamed Pasha Hassan (Abdel-Mouneem)
- El-Gosak
- Bilbeis (station)
- Bilbeis (Ville) (46 km off Mit-Abu-Khaleb)
- Kafr Ayoub
- El-Zaoura
- Kafr-el-Ayad
- El-Seneka
- Abu-Hammad (see 119)

=== 118A. El—Zaoura — Burdein ===
- El—Zaoura Kafr Abazah Burdein (see 118)
- Kafr Abazah
- Burdein

=== 119. Mit-Ghamr — Abu-Hammad ===
- Mit-Ghamr
- Foum-el-Safouria
- Santimay
- Oleila
- Shoubransour
- El Lebba
- El Hawaber
- El Farasha
- Diarb Nigm
- Shobak
- Mebacher Sharkia
- Ibrahimia Sharkia
- Kofour-Nigm
- Hurbeit
- Abu-Kebir
- Tukh-el-Caramous
- Menesterly Pasha (El-Salamon)
- El-Guebéla
- El-Nazla
- Abu-Hammad (67 km off Mit-Ghamr)

=== 120. Ibrahamia Sharkia — Hehia ===
- Ibrahamia Sharkia (see 119)
- Mit-Ghamr (see 119)
- Halawat
- Hehia (7 km off Ibrahamia Sharkia)

=== 121. Mit-Ghamr — Simbellawin ===
- Mit-Ghamr (see 119)
- Foum-el-Safouria (see 115)
- Foum-el-Bouhia (see 115)
- Mit-Mohsen
- Simbo Makam
- El-Bouha
- Sanafa
- Barhamtouche
- Kafr Shalla
- Kafr Tamboul
- Tukh-el-Aklam
- Simbellawin (37 km off Mit-Ghamr, see 122)

=== 122. Mit-Samanud — Zagazig ===
- Mit-Samanud
- Aga (see 115)
- Borg-el-Nour
- Shoubrahour Dakahlia
- Noury Pacha
- Simbellawin
- Gobran
- Sheikh-el-Kasmy
- Debig
- Barakim
- Kafr-Abdala
- Diarb Nigm
- Saft
- Equa
- Farcis
- Bahnabai
- Kanayat (see 117)
- Zagazig (60 km off Mit-Samanud, see 117)
