= Empain group =

Companies founded by Édouard Empain (1852–1929)

- Groupe Empain
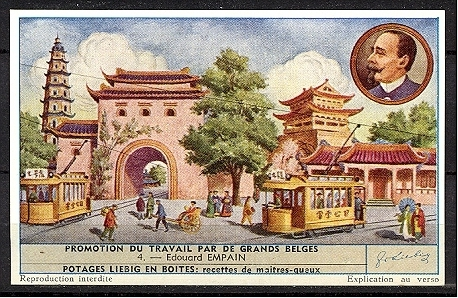
- Chromo illustrating tramways and other projects with a medallion portrait of Edouard Empain
- Named after: Édouard Empain
- Formation: 1881
- Founder: Édouard Empain
- Owners: Empain family

The Empain group was a loose grouping of companies founded by Édouard Empain (1852–1929) of Belgium and controlled by the Empain family. From 1881 until merging with Schneider & Cie in 1969, the companies engaged in a broad range of activities including tramways, railways, electricity generation, construction and mining. The main areas of activity were Belgium and France, but the group also pursued opportunities in Russia, Egypt, China and elsewhere, and played a large role in the development of the eastern Belgian Congo.

== Origins ==
The brothers Édouard and François Empain were the children of François-Julien Empain, a schoolteacher, and Catherine Lolivier. Both parents came from families of lower-middle-class artisans. Édouard graduated from high school in 1872 and obtained a job with the Société métallurgique et charbonnière belge. He was briefly a partner in a stone quarry company in 1878–1879, then became a partner in a company that produced marble and building stones, which was dissolved in 1882. In 1881 Édouard Empain and partners he had met through the Société métallurgique established a holding company, the Compagnie générale de Railways à voie étroite to build local light railways in Belgium and France. This was the first company of what would become the Empain group, which by 1913 was among the 50 largest enterprises in Europe. By then, either directly or via holding companies the Empain brothers owned £9 million in assets.

The Empain group before World War I (1914–1918) was run by the Empain brothers, assisted by a small group of professional managers. The legal and financial structure of the group was relatively loose, but the strategic decision-making process related to production and management was strongly centralized in the Paris offices. Between 1881 and 1888 the group was active only in Belgium and France. France would remain the most important market, accounting for about half of all activity in the pre-war period. In the period from 1889 to 1893 the Empain group set up businesses in Argentina, Venezuela, the Netherlands and the Ottoman Empire. In 1894 and 1895 the group expanded into Egypt, Serbia, Chile, Brazil, Austria-Hungary and Russia. From then until the start of World War I the group invested in Spain, China, Congo, Romania.

== Belgium and France ==
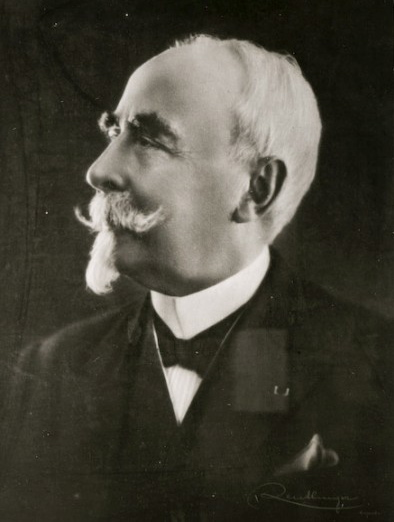
Baron Édouard Empain

The first line was along the Meuse between Liège and Jemeppe, operated by a subsidiary of the Compagnie Générale des Tramways à Voie Étroite. After the Belgian state created the Société Nationale des Chemins de Fer Vicinaux, Empain made most of his investments in the French market. Starting in 1883 he created a series of local lines in France. In 1891 Empain became interested in electric power, and created or participated in various electric tramways in France, Belgium and Russia.

The Compagnie russe française de chemins de fer et de tramways was founded in Brussels in August 1896 with administrative offices in Paris and Saint Petersburg with the purpose of investigating construction of railways in France, Russia and other countries. In France it developed the Paris Métro (Compagnie du chemin de fer métropolitain de Paris), Tramways électriques nord-parisiens, Tramways de Bordeaux, Electricité de Paris and Chemin de fer du Calvados. In December 1904 the Compagnie russe-francaise was absorbed by the Compagnie générale de Railways et d'electricité, which Empain had founded in Brussels.

Empain's enterprises involved various holding companies, which were open to outside investors:

- Compagnie Belge pour les Chemins de Fer Réunis (1892)
- Fédération Française et Belge des Tramways (1898)
- Société Parisienne pour l'Industrie des Chemins de Fer et des Tramways Électriques (1900), which succeeded the Société Russe-Française de Chemins de Fer et de Tramways
- Compagnie Générale des Chemins de Fer et Tramways in China (1902)

In January 1900 the Empain group founded a financial company in Paris, the Société parisienne pour l'industries des chemins de fer at tramways électriques (SPIE). In its early years it was mainly involved in all aspects of railways and tramsways. Later it became involved in production and distribution of electricity, and construction of electrical equipment. In 1904 Empain created the Compagnie Générale de Railways et d'Électricité (Electrorail), which succeeded the Compagnie Générale de Railways à Voie Étroite. This became the umbrella company for the Empain group in the electrical industry. That year Empain acquired a controlling interest in the Compagnie d'Électricité de Seraing et Extensions and founded the Société d'Électricité du Hainaut , Société d'Électricité du Pays de Liège and Société Bruxelloise de l'Électricité.

In 1904 Empain created the Ateliers de Constructions Electriques de Charleroi (ACEC) to counteract the German influence in the Belgian electricity industry. The company received financial support from the Rothschilds and the Banque de l'Union of Paris. The French authorities favoured ACEC. It was based on the factories of the Société Électricité et Hydraulique de Charleroi. In 1906 Empain created the Société des Ateliers de Constructions Électriques de Jeumont. Also in 1906 the Société d'Électricité du Hainaut merged with the Société d'Éclairage du Centre founded by Raoul Warocqué to create the Société Gaz et Électricité du Hainaut.

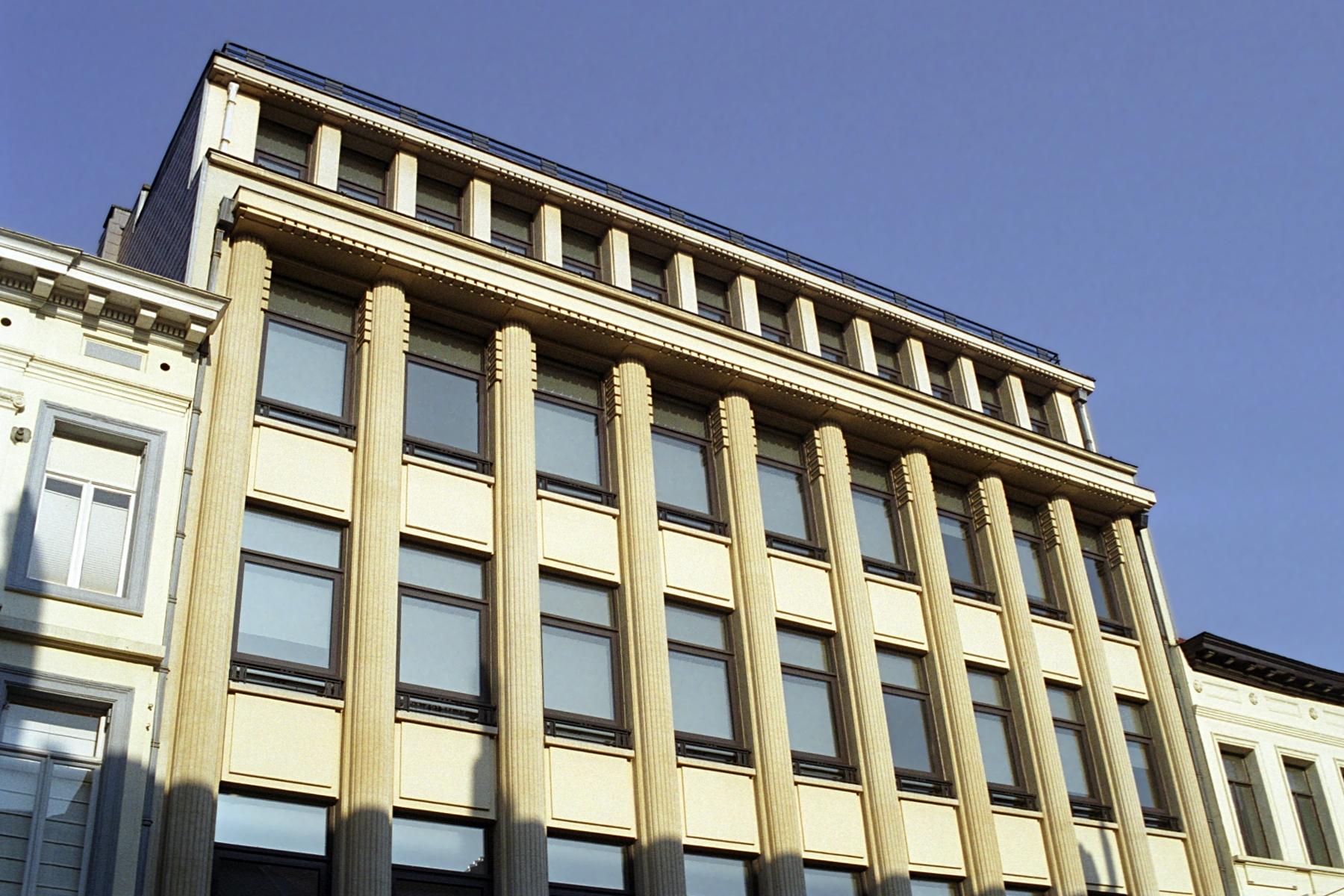
Electrorail headquarters (Art déco - Antoine Courtens - 1930–1931)

The Empain group had a complex structure of cross-shareholdings and joint subsidiaries. In 1930 the Compagnies Réunies d'Électricité et de Transports (Electrorail) was formed through a merger of the Compagnie Générale de Railways et d'Électricité (1904), Compagnie Belge pour les Chemins de Fer Réunis (1892) and the Fédération d'Entreprises de Transports et d'Électricité (1923). Some of the Empain businesses were taken over by other groups before the 1950s, including the Chemins de fer de la Banlieue de Reims, the Chemins de fer du Calvados and Cie générale de Chemins de fer et Tramways en Chine. After World War II (1939–1945) France nationalized all the electricity companies, including SERVA, SEP, EGN and SNE. Edouard-François Empain, son of François Empain, headed the business group from 1946 to 1967.

On 6 May 1954 the Empain group through its holding company SPIE (Société parisienne pour l'industries électriques) acquired a 20% stake in the SCB (Société de Construction des Batignolles). In 1962 Baron Jean Édouard Empain joined the SCB board. The merger of SPIE and SCB was decided in 1967 and effective in 1968. It was in part due to the struggle at that time by Empain to take over control of the Schneider group. The creation of SPIE Batignolles gave Empain a larger public works division than Schneider.

Empain obtained a share in the Schneider company in 1963, and the two businesses merged into a single holding company Empain Schneider in 1969, with two subsidiary companies Schneider SA (France) and Electrorail (Belgium). The Schneider company consisted of the Compagnie Industrielle de Travaux (CITRA), Société des forges et ateliers du Creusot (SFAC, later known as Creusot Loire)), and Société Minière Droitaumont-Bruville. The energy generation and telecommunications subsidiary Jeumont Schneider was formed in the late 1970s from parts of Schneider Empain, and from companies of the Jeumont Industrie group.

The Empain family exited the major holding it had in the Empain Schneider group in 1980 and the organization subsequently became known as Schneider SA. The Empain group collapsed in the 1980s.

== Russia, Egypt, Spain, Ottoman Empire, China ... ==
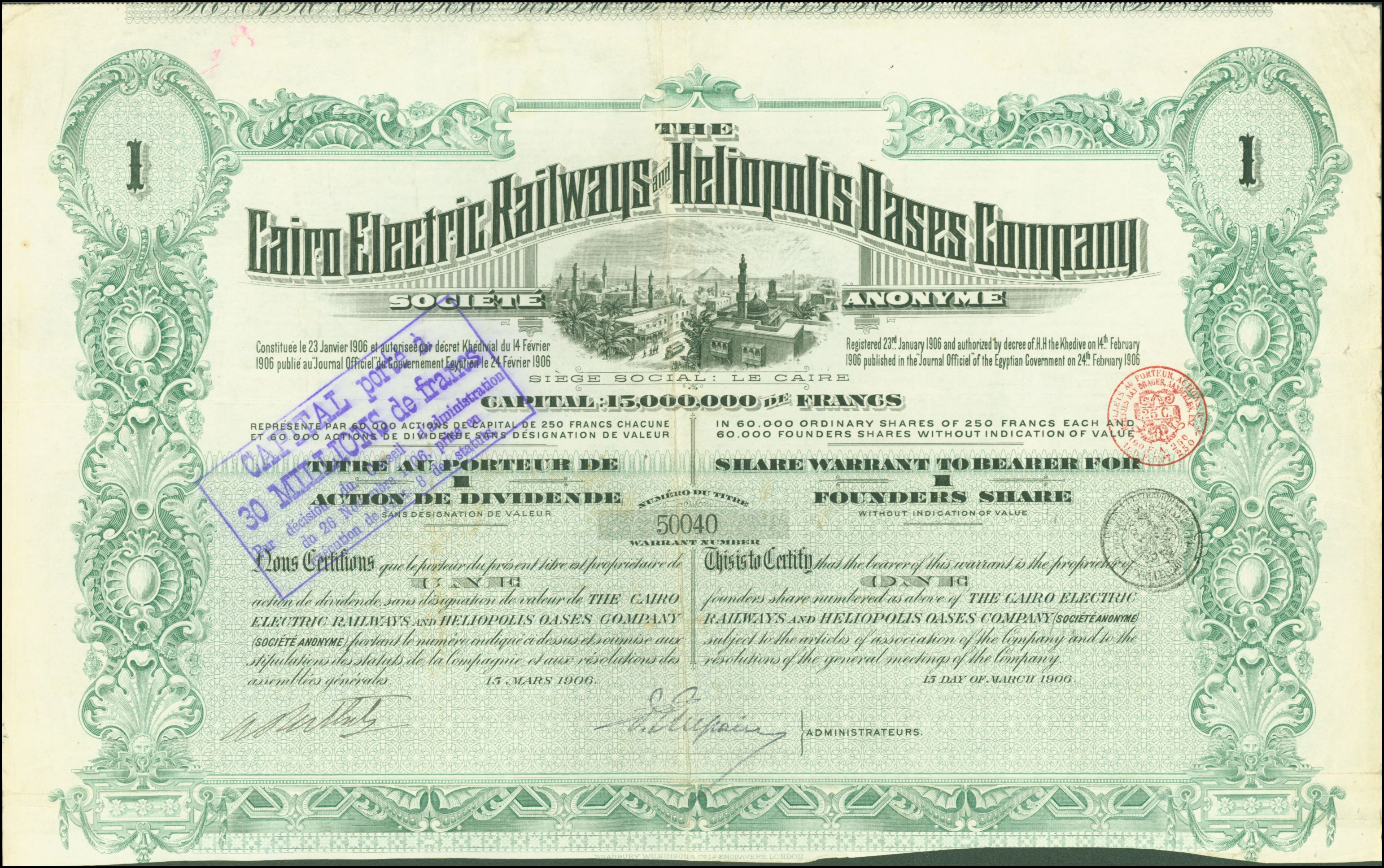
Cairo Electric Railways and Heliopolis Oases Company 1906

In Russia, the Compagnie russe française de chemins de fer et de tramways created the Tramways de Taschkent and Tramways de Berditchev, and owned interests in Tramways d'Astrakhan and Tramways de Kishinev.

In 1895 Empain participated in forming Cairo Tramways, and in 1896 in the Lower Egypt Railway Company. The Compagnie des chemins économiques de l'Est égyptien was founded by Empain on 19 May 1897. The Egyptian government granted the concession for 70 years, after which the railway had to be handed over to the State. It guaranteed for the investors a net income of 900 F/km. Half of the total income of 5,625 F per year and kilometre was due to be given to the government. Empain had a half share in the Société Générale de Tramways en Espagna, founded in 1899, which operated a network of tramways in Madrid.

Empain's Compagnie Belge pour les Chemins de Fer Réunis and Compagnie générale de Railways et d'électricité participated in several overseas ventures where more than half the capital was French, including Tramways de Kichinev, ICS Cairo Electric Railways and Heliopolis Oases and Société Ottomane du chemin de fer de Moudania-Brouuse, a small narrow-gauge railway. In 1910 they took a large share in the Tramways de Constantinople, and in 1913 in the Chemins de fer Lung-Tsing-U (the Longhai railway). In 1913 Baron Empain obtained the listing on the Paris Bourse of 60,000 shares of the Chemins de Fer Réunis.

After the 1911 Revolution in China the Empain group obtained a concession to extend the Pienlo railway as part of a 1,800 kilometres (1,100 mi) line to link Lanzhou to the sea. Empain was refused support by France, but then in 1913 given grudging support on condition of sharing the profits and appointing a Frenchman to run the company.

== Belgian Congo and Zaire ==
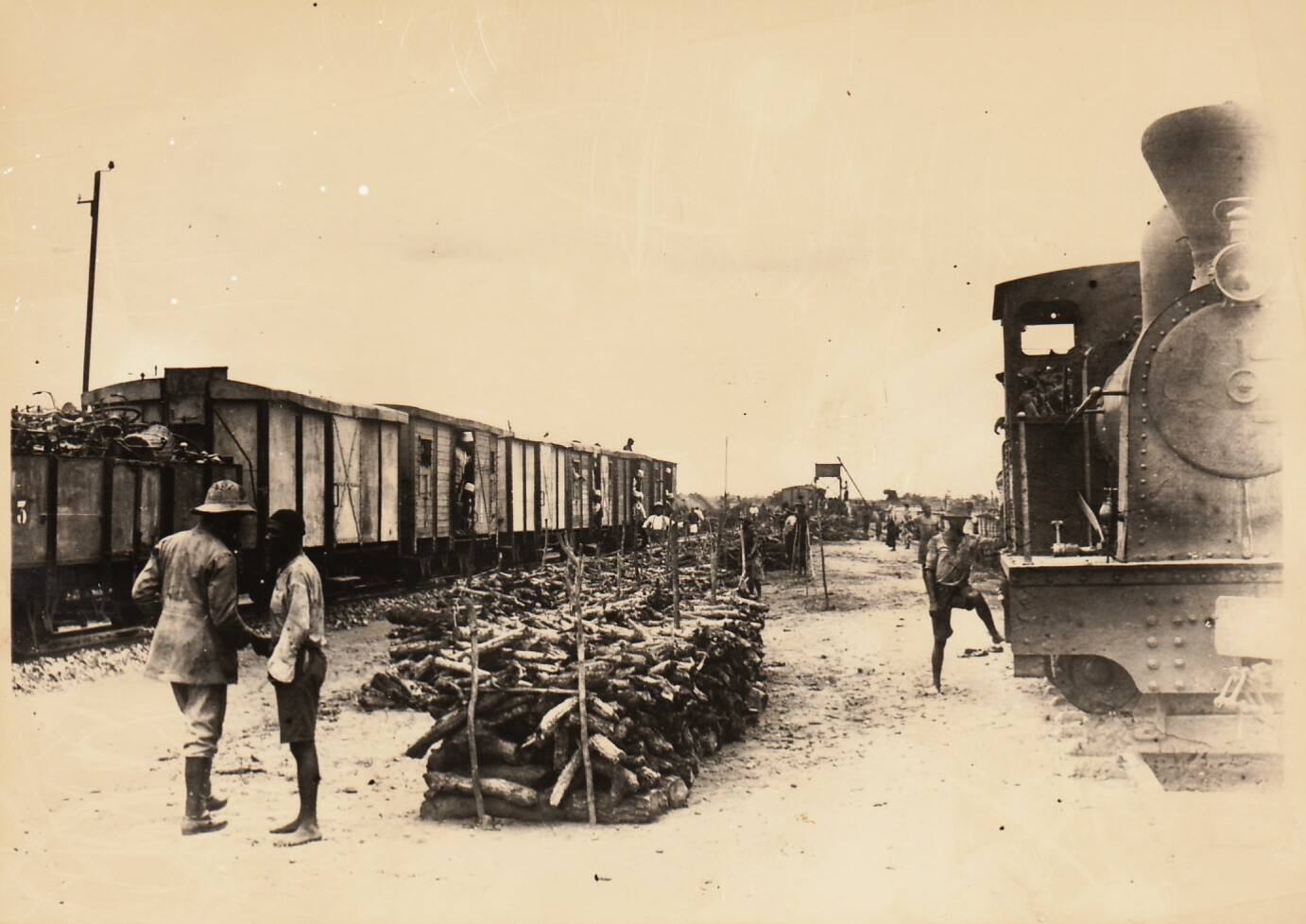
Compagnie des Grands Lacs Kongolo-Kindu - a freight train

In 1902 Empain founded the Compagnie des Chemins de Fer du Congo Supérieur aux Grands Lacs Africains (CFL) with a capital of 25 million francs. It had a concession to build railways in the east of the Congo Free State between the Congo River and lakes such as Lake Edward and Lake Tanganyika. The Compagnie Minière des Grands-Lacs (MGL), a mining subsidiary of the CFL, was established in what was now the Belgian Congo in 1923. In 1932, the Empain group and the Société Minière de la Tele created Cobelmin (Compagnie belge d'entreprises minières), a mining company that prospected and exploited mines for several companies that had obtained concessions in the CFL mining sector. Other subsidiaries included

- Société Minière du Lualaba (Miluba, 1932)
- Compagnie Minière de l'Urega (Minerga, 1933)
- Compagnie Minière du Nord de l'Ituri (Cominor, 1936)
- Compagnie Minière au RuandaUrundi (Mirudi, 1937)

The Empain group was deeply involved in the parastatal Comité National du Kivu created in 1928 to help settlers in the Kivu Province. The committee included representatives of the state and the CFL, and other interested companies. It was involved in transport infrastructure, public buildings, hospitals, schools, geology, agriculture, forestry among other responsibilities. Financing for the Empain group's activities in the Congo was provided by the Société Auxiliaire Industrielle et Financière des Grands Lacs Africains (Auxilacs), founded just after World War I (1914-1918), and the Compagnie Commerciale, Industrielle et Minière (CIM). In the mid-1950s the Empain group's European staff in the Belgian Congo and Ruanda-Urundi included 800 agents with 600 wives and 700 children, as well as 50,000 African workers with 37,000 wives and 59,000 children.

The Société Minière et Industrielle du Kivu (Sominki) was created to hold all the mining assets in Kivu Province by a convention of 31 May 1974. The merger was completed in March 1976, when Sominki took over Syndicat Miniere de l'Etain (Symetain). In October 1985 the London Metal Exchange recorded the largest crash in tin prices in its history. The Empain group, which owned 72% of the Sominki shares, looked for buyers. However, the only interest came from companies that only wanted the gold concessions, while the government of Zaire would not accept a buyer who would not also take on the tin concessions. In January 1996 African Mineral Resources Inc. (AMRI), a subsidiary of Banro Resource Corporation of Canada, and Mines D'Or du Zaire (MDDZ) bought the outstanding privately held shares of Sominki for $3.5 million.

== See also ==
- Banque Empain

== Sources ==
- Archives du Groupe Empain (PDF), Association pour la valorisation des archives d'entreprises – asbl
- Bitsch, Marie-Thérèse (1994), La Belgique entre la France et l'Allemagne, 1905–1914 (in French), Publications de la Sorbonne, ISBN 978-2-85944-239-2
- Coakley, George J. (1997), "The Mineral Industry of Congo (Kinshasa) – 1971", Minerals Yearbook: Area Reports, International. Africa and the Middle East, U.S. Department of the Interior; U.S. Geological Survey
- "Group Schneider S.A.", International Directory of Company Histories, vol. 20, The Gale Group, Inc.
- Kyanga Wasso, Athanase (3 May 2013), SOMINKI en liquidation (PDF) (in French), Bukavu: Société Minière et Industrielle du Kivu (SOMINKI)
- Said Mohamed, Pierre (April–June 1995), "Histoire d'une Entreprise : La Societe de Construction des Batignolles de 1940 À 1968", Histoire, Économie et Société (in French), 14 (2), Armand Colin: 317–329, doi:10.3406/hes.1995.1776, JSTOR 23611452
- Saul, Samir (2013), La France et l'Égypte de 1882 à 1914: Intérêts économiques et implications politiques (in French), Institut de la gestion publique et du développement économique, ISBN 978-2-8218-2862-9
- Schneider Electric, 170 years of history (PDF), Schneider Electric, pp. 8, 25
- "TIN: Republic of the Zaire", Mineral Trade Notes, vol. 71–78, U.S. Department of the Interior, Bureau of Mines, 1974
- Vandamme, Tobit (2019), Beyond Belgium: The business empire of Edouard Empain in the First Global Economy (1880–1914) (PDF) (thesis), Ghent University
