= Pierre de Lauzun =

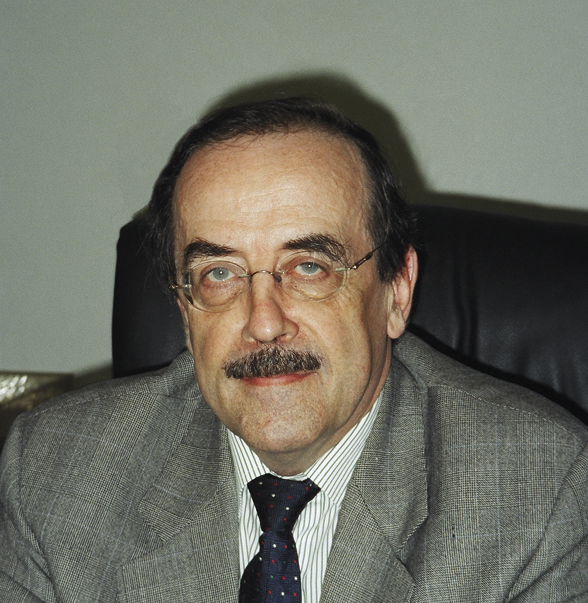
- Born: 12 January 1949 (age 77); Montélimar, France
- Education: Ecole Polytechnique (1969 class); French National School of Administration École nationale d'administration (Class Léon Blum, 1975).
- Occupations: CEO French Financial Markets Association AMAFI; Chairman of the International Council of Securities Associations (ICSA)
- Notable work: L’Évangile, le Chrétien et l’Argent (The Gospel, the Christian and Money) (2004);Temps, Histoire, Éternité (Time, History, Eternity) (2006); Finance : Un regard chrétien (Finance: A Christian Perspective) (2013); Guide de survie dans un monde instable, hétérogène, non régulé (Survival Guide in an Unstable, Heterogeneous, Unregulated World) (2017)
- Awards: Knight (Chevalier) of the Legion of Honor - Légion d'honneur of the French Republic; Commander in the Order of the Holy Sepulchre of Jerusalem; International 'Economy and Society' Prize of the Centesimus Annus Pro Pontifice Foundation (Vatican);
- Website: www.pierredelauzun.fr

Pierre de Lauzun, born 12 January 1949 in Montélimar, France, is a French essayist, civil servant, and financial expert. He has been CEO of the French Financial Market Association (AMAFI) since 2002.

== Activities ==
Essayist, high-ranking civil servant, financial expert

== Education ==
Pierre de Lauzun is a graduate of the Ecole Polytechnique (1969 class). He is also a former student of the French National School of Administration École nationale d'administration (Léon Blum 1975 Class).

== Career ==
His career has been primarily in Finance and External relations. He first worked in the French government, at the Office of the Prime Minister of France (1975–1981), at the French Treasury in the French Ministry for the Economy and Finance (Secretary General of the Paris Club from 1981 to 1984, Head of the Banking Office from 1984 to 1986 and then Financial Counselor in New York from 1986 to 1987.

He then moved to the banking and financial sector: Deputy Director General of the Banque de l'Union Européenne (BUE, which became European Union of CIC in 1990) from 1987 to 1994, then Chairman of the Industrial Credit Union (UIC, GAN Group) from 1994 to 1998; finally, following the acquisition of UIC, Chairman of Archon Group France from 1998 to 2000 (Goldman Sachs Group).

He subsequently joined professional associations: the French Banking Federation (Fédération Bancaire Française or FBF, the professional organisation for banks) as Deputy Chief Executive Officer from 2001 to 2014; and the French Association of Financial Markets (AMAFI, Association of the professionals of the Stock Exchange and Financial Markets<) as CEO from 2002 to 2018; and from 2017 to 2019, he has been Chairman of the International Council of Securities Associations.

== Other interests ==
Pierre de Lauzun is also :

- Former treasurer and founding member of the Foundation for Schools;
- Chairman of the Association of Catholic Economists;
- Member of the French Catholic Academy (Académie catholique de France)French Catholic Academy
- Chairman of Alba Cultura (making art present in prisons and other places of detention);
- Member of Entrepreneurs et dirigeants chrétiens (French Christian Business leaders); Chairman of the Economic and Financial Ethical Committee.

=== Distinctions ===
- Sponsor of the 2015 Class (Promotion 2015 ) of the Catholic Institute of Higher Studies (Institut catholique d'études supérieures - ICES).
- International 'Economy and Society' Prize of the Centesimus Annus Pro Pontifice Foundation (Vatican) for 'Finance a Christian perspective' - Finance un regard chrétien (May 2015).
- Grand officer in the Order of the Holy Sepulchre of Jerusalem (supporting Christians in the Holy Land)
- Knight (Chevalier) of the Legion of Honor - Légion d'honneur and Officer of the National Order of Merit - Ordre national du Mérite

== Theoretical contribution ==
The author provides reflexions mainly inspired by Thomistic philosophy (Thomism) and by Catholic Social Teaching, as well as by his professional experience in finance, on philosophical, political, economic and financial issues, as well as his action in favour of a more ethical finance.

=== Philosophical dimension ===
The perspective of the plurality of philosophies Philosophy is discussed in his book 'Heaven and the Forest (Beyond Pluralism)' - Le Ciel et la Forêt (Au-delà du pluralisme) (2000) which shows that there is only a restricted and non-contradictory plurality of acceptable points of view, with a common reference given by the tradition of classical thought that culminates in Thomism. He defends the idea that such a plurality reaches to unity thanks to the divine perspective. This book is completed by an examination of the rationality of faith and its legitimate contribution to philosophy with 'Philosophy of Faith' - Philosophie de la foi (2015). In religious matters proper, he addressed the question of the plurality of religions and the central role of Christianity in Volume II of 'Heaven and the Forest (Christianity and Other Religions)' - Le Ciel et la Forêt (Le christianisme et les autres religions) (2000). As regards Time, his basic book is 'Time, History, Eternity' -Temps Histoire Éternité (2006). This book relates the diversity of human conceptions of time to the eternity of God, thus offering a reflection on the meaning of personal destiny and of history. From the religious perspective, he examines the issue of Christian Revelation and the development of Christian doctrine in history, considering it as an expression of eternity in time in 'Christian revelation or eternity in time', 2018 - La révélation chrétienne ou l’éternité dans le temps. He raises the issue of Evil, the existence of God, time and history in Dieu, le Mal et l'Histoire 2022.

=== Political dimension ===
His reflection on politics questions the relationship between plurality, which is inherent to the political debate, and the idea of truth, as a norm for morality. His book, 'The Future of Democracy' - L’Avenir de la Démocratie (2011) focuses on the complexity of the concept of democracy and the tormented history of its emergence. He emphasizes that alongside the political system and the rule of law, a central role has been played by what he calls democratic ideology, which is in fact a paradigm of normative neutrality, based on the rejection of the collective search for a common and objective idea of good, and favoring mere procedures confronting individual choices. He doubts such a regime can be sustainable in the long run. This book has been completed and developed in 2019 by Pour un grand retournement politique : face aux impasses du paradigme actuel. In his book 'Survival Guide to an Unstable, Heterogeneous and Unregulated World' -Guide de survie dans un monde instable, hétérogène, non régulé (2017), the multiple effects of this lack of common reference in a fragmented world such as ours, is discussed from various angles: geopolitical, military, financial, economic, political and cultural, and he questions the possible ways to overcome the failures of the Western model. He examines the issue of just war in La guerre juste 2024. Pierre de Lauzun is particularly interested in the political role of the nation : in his book 'Nations and Their Destiny' - Les nations et leur destin (2005), he shows both that nations are rooted in their cultural and linguistic characteristics as much as in their history, and their essential role for the constitution of real democracy. 'Christianity and Democracy' (2003) - Chrétienté et démocratie deals with the complex relations in history between Christianity and politics, particularly with democracy (2003).

=== Economic and financial dimension ===
'The Gospel, Christians, and Money' (2004) - L’Évangile, les Chrétiens et l’Argent deals with the general question of economics from a Christian perspective, drawing on the Gospel and Catholic social teaching. 'Economics and Christianity' (2010) - L’Économie et le christianisme (2010) extends and broadens this perspective by emphasizing, on the one hand, the central role of ethics in economics, and on the other hand the importance of the question of risk, a basic limit to human action, which can find a counterweight in the trust in divine providence At the same time, 'Christianity and economic growth' (2008) - Christianisme et croissance économique (2008) historically shows the key role of Christianity in the economic growth of the Western world 'Finance, a Christian Perspective' (2013) - Finance, un regard chrétien (2013) traces, still from the Gospel, the reflection and experience of the Catholic Church in financial matters, highlighting the incompleteness of finance itself and its need for an ethical perspective. For this book the author was awarded the international prize of the Centesimus Annus Foundation of the Vatican. Published in English in the US in 2021 as 'Finance A Christian Perspective' by Angelico Press. It is followed by L'Argent, Maître ou serviteur (2019) dedicated to our relationship to money. This same question is taken up again without appealing to explicitly Christian references in 'Can Finance serve Man?' (2015) - La Finance peut-elle être au service de l’homme ?, which is completed by reflections on the role of regulation, particularly in view of the 2008 crisis. A book is about ethical investment: Epargner en vue du bien commun, l'investissement éthique 2024. Finally, a small book on the euro raises the question of currency in general, and more particularly the difficulties posed by this single currency : 'Euro: The end of the single currency?' (2017) - Euro : vers la fin de la monnaie unique ?.

== Publications ==
- Le Ciel et la Forêt (The Sky and the Forest)- Tome I "Au-delà du pluralisme"; Tome II "Le christianisme et les autres religions", Dominique Martin Morin, 2000.
- Chrétienté et Démocratie (Christianity and Democracy), Pierre Téqui, 2003.
- L’Évangile, le Chrétien et l’Argent (The Gospel, the Christian and Money), Editions du Cerf, 2004[27].
- Les Nations et leur destin (Nations and their destiny), F.-X. de Guibert, 2005.
- Temps, Histoire, Éternité (Time, History, Eternity), Parole et Silence, 2006.
- Christianisme et Croissance économique (Christianity and Economic Growth), Parole et Silence, 2008.
- L’Économie et le Christianisme (Economics and Christianity), F.-X. de Guibert 2010. Translated in Serbian.
- L’Avenir de la démocratie (The Future of Democracy) (Politique I), F.-X. de Guibert 2011.
- Finance : Un regard chrétien (Finance: A Christian Perspective), Embrasure, 2013. International Prize of the Centesimus annus Pro Pontifice Foundation (Vatican), 2015.
- La finance peut-elle être au service de l’homme ?( Can finance serve man?) Desclée de Brouwer, 2015.
- Philosophie de la foi (Philosophy of Faith), Arjalas, 2015.
- Euro : La Fin de la monnaie unique ? (Euro: The end of the single currency ?)TerraMare, 2017.
- Guide de survie dans un monde instable, hétérogène, non régulé (Survival Guide in an Unstable, Heterogeneous, Unregulated World), TerraMare, 2017.
- La Révélation chrétienne ou l’Éternité dans le temps (Christian Revelation or Eternity in Time), Artège Lethielleux, 2018.
- Pour un grand retournement politique : face aux impasses du paradigme actuel, Paris, Le Bien commun, 2019.
- L'Argent, Maître ou serviteur, Mame, 2019.
- Finance A Christian Perspective, Angelico Press, 2021.
- Dieu, le Mal et l'Histoire, Pierre Téqui 2022
- Epargner en vue du bien commun, l'investissement éthique, Boleine 2024
- La guerre juste, Boleine 2024
