= Ghaleb Husseini =

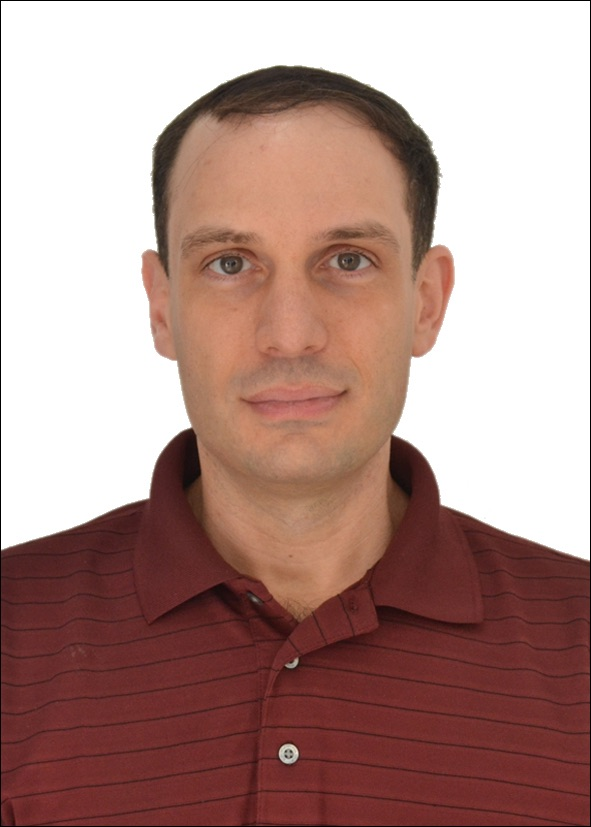
Ghaleb Husseini

Ghaleb A. Husseini is a chemical-engineering professor in the College of Engineering at the American University of Sharjah (AUS). He is a member of the Mohammed bin Rashed Academy of Scientists in the United Arab Emirates.

== Academia ==
Ghaleb Husseini graduated with Bachelor of Science and Master of Science degrees in 1995 and 1997, respectively, from Brigham Young University, where he also finished his doctoral research in chemical engineering with an emphasis in biomedical engineering in 2001. In January 2004, he was appointed as an assistant professor in chemical engineering at AUS, where he was promoted to associate professor and professor in 2008 and 2013, respectively. He served as the Associate Dean of Graduate Studies and Research in the AUS College of Engineering for two years, starting May 2017. He works in the area of ultrasonic drug delivery.

He has 170 academic publications, three US patents, and six book chapters, and is cited over 7200 times. According to Google Scholar, he holds an h-index & i10-index of 46 and 110, respectively. He held the distinguished lecturer position at IEEE-EMBS (Institute of Electrical and Electronics Engineers - Engineering in Medicine and Biology Society) Jan 2014- Dec 2015. His project entitled "Nanocarriers and Ultrasound in Cancer Treatment" was highly commended as the Institute of Chemical Engineers (IChemE) Research Project of the Year - IChemE Global Awards 2016, and was shortlisted again in the Pharma Category in the IChemE Global Awards 2018. In May 2018, he won the TIP (Technology Innovation Pioneer) Health Care Award. Ghaleb was appointed as an Associate Editor for IEEE Transactions on Nanobioscience in May 2020. He is also serving on the editorial board of the International Review of Applied Sciences and Engineering (IRASE) and served on the editorial board of the European Journal of Nanomedicine 2016–2018. Dr. Husseini spent a sabbatical at the École Polytechnique Fédérale de Lausanne (EPFL) working in Dr. Jeffrey A. Hubbell's laboratory and served as the Dana Gas Endowed Chair for Chemical Engineering (2017-2023). He was featured in Nissan's Drive Safe campaign in January 2020.

== Research ==
He formed the 'Ultrasound in Cancer Research' Group at the American University of Sharjah in 2012, leading a team of undergraduate and graduate students, faculty members, and visiting intellectuals. He has also set up a biomedical engineering lab at AUS to aid the project. As a response to the successes of the team, he has been interviewed and his work highlighted by a number of local and international newspapers: The Gulf Today, News AlYoum, Emarat Al Youm, Al Khaleej, Gulf News, Al Bayan, WAM (Emirates News Agency), Alpha News, News Hub, MIT Technology Review, Sharjah 24, GineersNow, and The National, as well as key television channels including a comprehensive report by Sky News where he was interviewed about the results of his research.

Dr. Husseini was one of the first 20 expats to be granted a long-term visa in the UAE based on scientific distinction, and his research work exhibited in the Innovator's section in the UAE Pavilion at the EXPO2020.
