= Leopold II =

Leopold II commonly refers to:

- Leopold II, Holy Roman Emperor (1747–1792)
- Leopold II of Belgium (1835–1909)

It may also refer to:

- Leopold II, Margrave of Austria (1050–1095)
- Leopold II, Duke of Austria (1328–1344)
- Leopold II, Prince of Anhalt-Dessau (1700–1751)
- Leopold II, Prince of Lippe (1796–1851)
- Leopold II, Grand Duke of Tuscany (1797–1870)
