= Shah Ghaleb =

Shah Ghaleb شاه غالب
- Village
- Country: Iran
- Province: Kohgiluyeh and Boyer-Ahmad
- County: Boyer-Ahmad
- Bakhsh: Margown
- Rural District: Zilayi

Population (2006)
  - Total: 176
- Time zone: UTC+3:30 (IRST)
  - Summer (DST): UTC+4:30 (IRDT)

Shah Ghaleb (Persian: شاه غالب, also Romanized as Shāh Ghāleb) is a village in Zilayi Rural District, Margown District, Boyer-Ahmad County, Kohgiluyeh and Boyer-Ahmad Province, Iran. According to the 2006 Census, its population is 176, with 36 families.
