= Mit Abu Ghaleb =

Mit Abu Ghaleb ميت أبو غالب
- city
- Location in Egypt
- Coordinates: 31.293074°N 31.657078°E
- Country: Egypt
- Governorate: Damietta
- Time zone: UTC+2 (EET)
  - Summer (DST): UTC+3 (EEST)

Mit Abu Ghaleb (Arabic: ميت أبو غالب) is a village in Damietta Governorate, Egypt.

== See also ==
- List of cities and towns in Egypt
