= Canon de 16 C modèle 1864 =

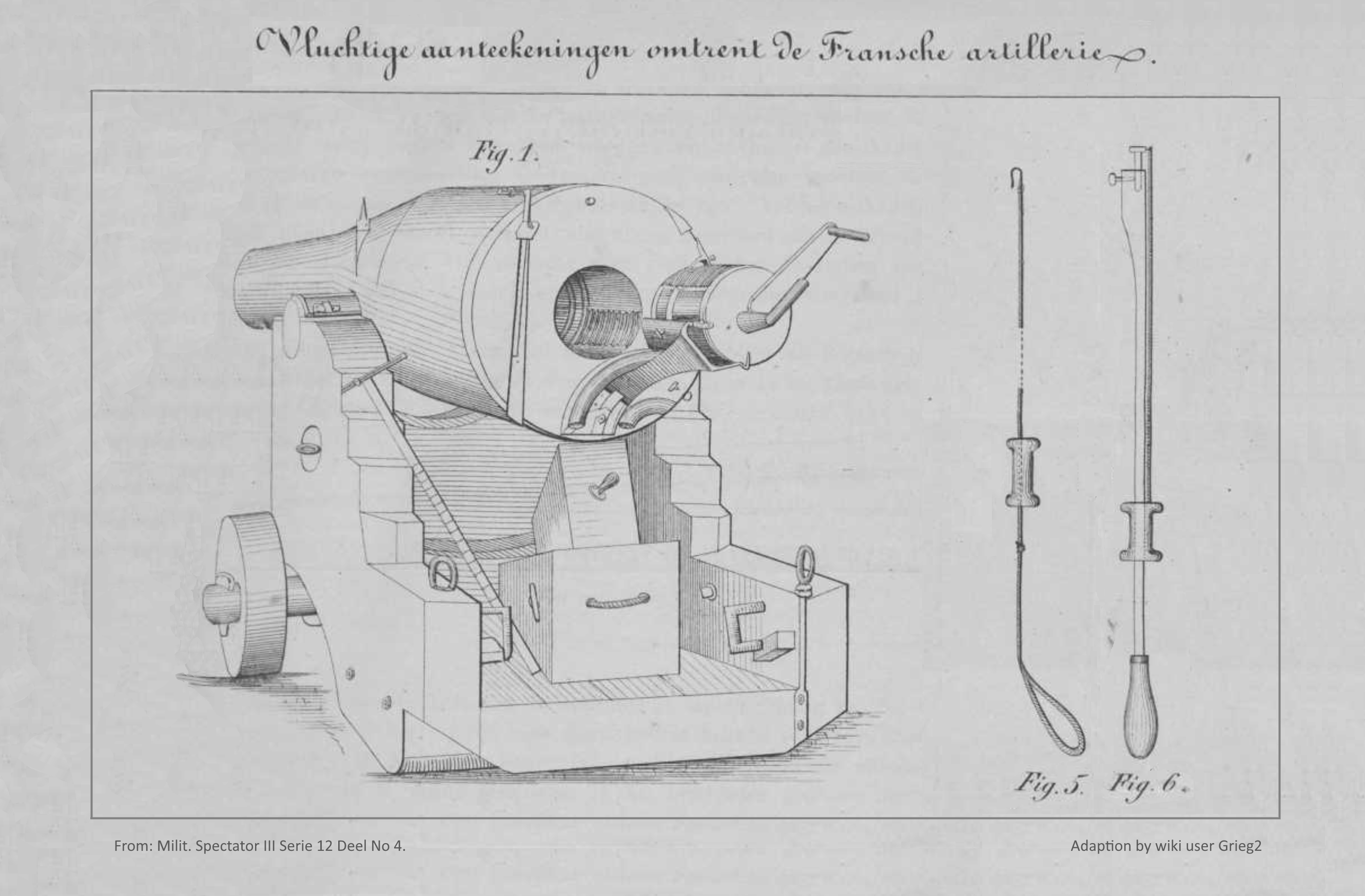
- The 16 cm model 1864 gun after a photograph
- Type: Naval artillery
- Place of origin: France

Service history
- Used by: None (prototype)

Production history
- Designed: October 1864 (start)
- Manufacturer: Ruelle Foundry
- Produced: 1867

Specifications
- Mass: 5,000 kg
- Length: 3,385 mm
- Barrel length: 3,149 mm (bore)
- Shell: None
- Caliber: 164.7 mm (6.48 in)
- Elevation: 13-28°
- Muzzle velocity: 345 m/s (steel shot); 365 m/s (grenade)
- Effective firing range: 600 m (AP shot); 7,250 m (grenade)

The Canon de 16 C modèle 1864 from here: 16 cm model 1864, was a French rifled breech loading built-up gun. It was made of cast-iron reinforced with steel hoops.

== Context ==
The 16 cm model 1864 had a rather direct relation to the heaviest traditional smoothbore muzzle loaders that western navies used in the broadside of their sailing warships. In the United Kingdom, this was the 32-pounder gun. In France, this was the 36-pounder long gun, later replaced by the 30-pounder long gun. The size of these guns was determined by what sailors could practically handle on board.

In 1855, the Battle of Kinburn made it clear that traditional smoothbore guns were not able to penetrate ships with iron armor. There were basically two options to achieve this. The first was to equip ships with higher caliber guns like the British 68-pounder gun. The other option was to use rifled guns, which fired elongated and therefore heavier, projectiles.

For the French Navy, four successive families of rifled guns were made. The first was the modèle 1855, which consisted only of a 22 cm shell gun which was bored down to 164 mm and rifled. The second was the modèle 1858–1860. This consisted of 7 guns, of which four were 30-pounders. Three of those were smoothbores that had been changed to become rifled muzzle loaders. The fourth was a newly designed gun. Like the others, it was a rifled and hooped gun, but it was also a breech loader. The relation to the other three is that it got the same 164.7 mm caliber and was generally of the same dimensions. The other families of guns were the modèle 1864-66 and the modèle 1870.

== Development ==
The model 1864 guns initially included guns of 16, 19, 24, and 27 cm caliber. They were designed after the March 1862 Battle of Hampton Roads showed that newer armor was almost impregnable to the existing rifled and ultra heavy smoothbore guns. The 1864 model introduced improvements to the hooping, the breech system, and the casting process. It allowed the weight of the projectile to be raised from two to three times that of the traditional solid spherical bullet while still giving it a higher velocity.

In spite of these improvements in effectiveness, the 19 cm model 1864 and the 24 cm model 1864 guns made it clear that the 30-pounder / 16 cm gun was no longer sufficient for the line of battle. This did not mean that the 16 cm caliber became obsolete. Smaller vessels were generally not suitable to mount a 19 or 24 cm gun. Later on, the Canon de 14 C modèle 1864 was introduced, but this fired only grenades and canister shot.

The first designs for the 16 cm model 1864 were made in October and December 1864. Changes were made right up to January 1868. Overall, the gun stayed somewhat close to the general dimensions of the changed (i.e., rifled) smoothbore 30-pounder model 1858. The caliber remained 164.7 cm, total length increased from 3,250 to 3,385 mm, and weight from 3,640 to 5,000 kg.

== Characteristics ==
=== Barrel ===
The barrel of the 16 cm model 1864 was made of cast iron reinforced with steel hoops called frettes. It was 3,385 mm long with a length of bore of 3,149 mm. The rifled part of the barrel was 2,725 mm long with a caliber of 164.7 mm. The powder chamber was initially 426 mm long with a diameter of 177.7 mm.

The obturator was a metal ring. It was placed in a short conic area of the barrel behind the powder chamber. When a second obturator was introduced in September 1866, the length of the powder chamber was reduced to 396 mm.

The breech block was held by an area of the barrel that was 180 mm long with a diameter of 223 mm in the screw grooves. A Dutch observer said it was made according to the Eastman system.

The rifling was at first planned to continue into the powder chamber. The March 1866 design made it stop before the chamber. There were three grooves. Groove No 1 was connected to a channel (rigole) that positioned the projectile so it fit the grooves.

The design of the hooping (frettage) of the gun took quite some time. The 26 September 1865 design was the first to be applied in regular production. It consisted of 8 steel rings. The first was situated before the trunnions and was 175 mm long. The trunnion ring was 320 mm long and 60 mm thick. Behind it was a conic ring of 175 mm long and 70 mm thick. It was followed by three 175 mm long rings and one of 280 mm length. The ring over the breech was again conic and 175 mm long.

On 1 March 1866, this system was changed to facilitate production. The four rings behind the trunnion ring were replaced by three of 250 mm length and 70 mm thickness. The two rings at the rear were replaced by one with a length of 250 mm and another of 155 mm length. A final change in January 1868 made the ring before the trunnions longer and the trunnion ring itself shorter. This was done to simplify production of the trunnion ring.

=== Projectiles ===
The 16 cm model 1864 fired solid steel shot, grenades and canister shot. The solid steel shot were meant to pierce armor and did not have an internal explosive charge. The grenades were meant to be used against softer targets, and the canister shot was meant to be used against personnel.

Like the other model 1864 guns, the 16 cm gun was planned to get two kinds of solid steel shot meant for piercing armor. The first was the cylindrical shot called boulet cylindrique en acier. This had a spherical head which had been flattened a bit. It was meant for use at the shortest ranges. Its design had been approved on 25 March 1862. A new design was approved on 14 March 1866, but on 8 September 1866 it was decided to change these to ogive shot. This was done by removing part of the steel at the front and melting a tip onto the rest. On 18 July 1866 a new design was approved for the cylindrical shot. This showed some minor differences with the 1862 model. There was also a cast-iron cylindrical exercise shot that was a bit longer to get the same weight.

The ogive solid steel shot (boulet ogival en acier) was made of hammered steel and had the usual form of an ogive front, cylindrical body and flat rear end. Its first approved design dates from 18 June 1866. It weighed 45 kg. There was also a cast iron exercise shot. This had the same form, but was a bit longer to get the same weight. A similar chilled cast iron shot was a bit shorter.

The chilled cast-iron grenade (obus oblong en fonte dure) was a grenade of which the surface had been made harder by chilling. It was first designed in September 1867. The design was approved in September 1868. Its form was like that of the ogive shot, but it had a hollow inside of corresponding form that received the explosive charge. On the outside there were three studs at the beginning of the cylindrical part and three others near the bottom. The empty projectile weighed 43.340 kg. Loaded and ready it weighed 45 kg. The explosive charge weighed 600 grams.

The 16 cm model 1864 could fire the same ogive cast-iron grenade (obus oblong en fonte) that was used in the model 1858-60 16 cm breechloader. However, it was better to use the model 1862 grenade which had stronger studs. At 29.1 kg, the regular grenade was much lighter than the other projectiles. In the late 1880s, the fully prepared regular grenade weighed 31.49 kg and had an explosive charge of 1,300 grams.

Finally, the gun was also able to fire the solid spherical cast iron bullet.

=== Performance ===
For the 16 cm model 1864 it was assumed that precision and range for firing a steel shot with a charge of 7.5 kg were almost the same as for firing the lighter grenade with a charge of 5 kg. Later, more precise numbers were given. With a charge of 7.5 kg, the two kinds of steel shot reached an initial velocity of 345 m/s. With a charge of 5 kg, the grenade attained an initial velocity of 365 m/s.

At an elevation of 35°, the grenade could reach a distance of 7,250 m. The spread was then 16 m in the direction of fire and 44 m in width. This was comparable with the heavier 19 and 24 cm model 1864 guns.

The steel shot were mean for close range, with the cylindrical shot meant for the shortest range. Elevated to 4°, the shot reached to 1,700 m. However, against armored ships, it should not be used at greater distances than 600 m. At 300 m it penetrated 15 cm of armor.

=== On board carriages ===
There were a lot of carriages for the 16 C model 1864. The Affût de batterie a Échantignolles was a broadside carriages with two little wheels in front and cleats at (échantignolles) at the rear. These cleats slid over the deck and thus provided a lot of friction. They were a disadvantage when the gun had to be brought back in battery. There were two kinds of 'Affût de batterie a Échantignolles pour Canon de 16 Cent. Mod. 1864'. One was made from the carriages used by the 50-pounder smoothbore guns mounted on the floating batteries. The other kind came from such carriages which had been used on gunboats and put the barrel a bit higher. The battery variant allowed elevation to 13°, for the 'gunboat' kind this was 22°.

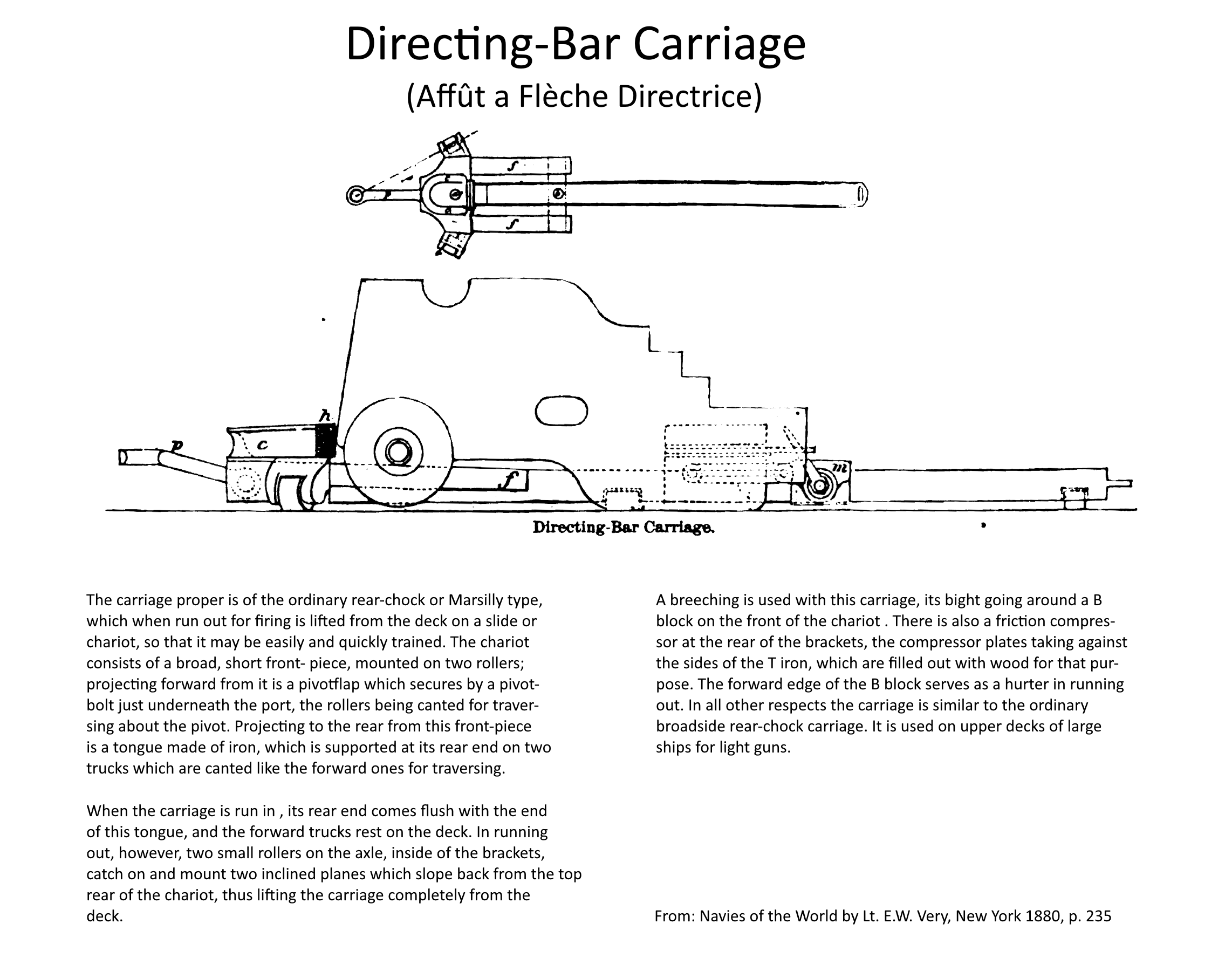
Directing-Bar carriage

The Directing-Bar carriage 'Affût a Flèche Directrice pour Canon de 16 Cent. Mod. 1864' was named for an iron bar (flèche) on sideways rollers that traversed about a pivot fixed near the hull. In firing position, this bar lifted the carriage of the ground, easing lateral aiming. After firing, the recoil made the upper carriage slide over the deck on its own wheels and cleats. This carriage could also be used without the flèche. With flèche, it could elevate the gun to 21°.

The carriage with double pivot was ordered after an experiment on board the British HMS Megaera and a look at the double pivot of USS Kearsarge. This was basically an upper deck carriage that consisted of a traditional carriage that slid over a wooden frame called slide. Guiding rails then allowed the gun that was normally placed on the center line of the ship, to attach to a front pivot on either side of the ship's hull. The carriage for the model 1864 gun was called Affût système français No 2 pour canon de 16 cent. Mod. 1864. At least some of these were later converted to use a central pivot. The No. 2 carriage allowed the gun to incline 3° and to elevate to 32°.

The 'Affût a chassis tournant pour canon de 16 cent. Mod. 1864' also consisted of a carriage sliding over a frame. Carriage and slide were made of sheet metal. It turned on a central pivot. The carriage was originally meant for the semi-turrets of the armored corvettes. It was however changed for use on the upper deck of smaller avisos, making the carriage very defective. The carriage allowed elevation from -5 to +28°.

=== Coastal defense carriages ===
The preceding rifled 16 cm guns of model 1858-60 were widely used for coastal defense. The 16 cm model 1864 were not used in coastal defense. This is explained by the fact that the insight that higher calibers were necessary came about in the early 1860s, see above. A description of coastal carriages for the model 1864 guns therefore begins with the 19 cm gun.

== Use ==
The French navy found little use for the gun on its big ironclads. Earlier ships like the Gloire-class ironclads used the 16 C model 1858-60, but by the time that the 16 cm model 1864 was made, these were replaced by bigger guns. The Belliqueuse initially had four 16 cm guns, in January 1876 these were certainly 16 cm model 1864. The floating battery Implacable got two 16 cm model 1864 guns after it became an annex of the French gunnery school.

On board the screw frigates the gun was widely used to arm the main battery. Victoire and Flore got 12 16 cm model 1864 and four 16 cm model 1858. The screw frigate Thémis had 12 16 cm model 1864 and six 16 cm model 1858. Armorique got only 12 16 cm model 1864. The screw frigates Vénus got ten 16 cm model 1864.

On smaller vessels that did not have a covered battery deck, the gun was also used as main armament, but in smaller numbers. Even so, the gun often proved to be too heavy. The Châteaurenault had five Canon de 16 cm model 1864. The wooden corvette Laclocheterie initially had three 16 cm model 1864. Infernet was later re-armed with a model 1864. The Sané initially had a 16 cm model 1864.

In 1867 the Beautemps-Beaupré cruisers were projected. After the 19 cm guns proved too heavy, Beautemps-Beaupré got one 19 cm gun and two 16 cm model 1864's. These were later replaced by smaller mod. 1870 guns. Dayot got a single 16 cm model 1864 gun.
