= Spie Batignolles =

France-based construction company

- Company type: private company
- Industry: Engineering / Construction
- Founded: 1968
- Headquarters: Neuilly-sur-Seine, Île-de-France
- Key people: François-Xavier Clédat (Président-Directeur général)
- Revenue: €2,270 million (2011)
- Number of employees: circa 8,300 (2011)
- Website: www.spiebatignolles.fr

Spie Batignolles is a French construction company based in Neuilly-sur-Seine. The company provides building and infrastructure construction in France, Germany, the United Kingdom, Spain, Portugal and Switzerland.

== Company history ==
Ernest Goüin founded Ernest Goüin & Cie. in 1846. It later became Société de Construction des Batignolles (SCB). Meanwhile, the Société Parisienne pour l’Industrie des Chemins de Fer et des Tramways Electriques was founded and became, in 1900 under the directorship of baron Édouard Empain, Société Parisienne pour l’Industrie Electrique (SPIE).

As early as 1954, SPIE acquired part of SCB's capital and in 1968 the two companies merged to form Spie Batignolles.

During the 1970s and 1980s, Spie Batignolles acquired several other companies: Compagnie Industrielle de Travaux (CITRA) in 1972, Canalisations Pétrolifères, Aquifères et Gazières (CAPAG) in 1977, and Travaux Industriels pour l’Electricité (TRINDEL) in 1982. In 1989 the rail construction company Drouard was acquired, forming the foundation of the group's rail construction engineering company Spie Rail.

The 1990s brought several waves of restructuring. In 1990, Spie Batignolles created Spie Construction, the building and civil engineering branch of the company. In 1992, Spie Construction merged with CITRA to become SPIE CITRA.

In 1997 the company was bought from the Schneider group with the help of a management buyout supported by AMEC. A year later, Spie Batignolles changed its name to SPIE with its three daughter companies becoming Spie Trindel, Spie Enertrans, and Spie Batignolles; operating the energy, transportation and construction fields respectively.

On 1 July 2003, Spie as a whole was purchased by AMEC; the acquired company was split in three: the engineering branch of Spie in Europe was renamed AMEC SPIE, a rail construction business AMEC Spie Rail was created, and the remaining construction business was grouped under the name Spie Batignolles. AMEC announced that it would seek to sell the construction arm of the business 'Spie Batignolles', and entered negotiations to secure a management buyout of that division; the management buyout of the construction division by 78 senior managers was completed in September 2003 with the aid of Barclays Private Equity Finance. In 2004, Financière Spie Batignolles purchased the remaining Spie Batignolles shares owned by Amec Spie.

The two other former divisions became separate companies: in 2005 AMEC announced it was to sell its Spie acquisition of 2003. the engineering company AMEC SPIE was sold to PAI Partners for €1040 million in 2006, The European rail business joint venture Amec Spie Rail systems was sold for an estimated £200million in 2007, to Colas Group.

The metal construction company CM Paimbeuf (acquired 1995) was bought by Fayat in 2008.

== Constituents of the Spie Batignolles Group ==
- Spie Foundations
- Spie Batignolles TPCI, underground construction, civil engineering, infrastructure and industrial construction
- Spie Batignolles technologies, concrete and wood pathological treatment
- Valérian, earthwork
- Spie Batignolles réseaux, multi-site renovation and construction
- Spie Batignolles immobilier, real estate advertising
- Spie Batignolles concessions, car park concessions and swimming pools
- Eurelec et Fontelec, electric installation électrique and mutlitechnical maintenance

== Major projects ==
- Saddam International Airport, Baghdad, Iraq, 1979
- Pegasus Bridge, 1994
- Channel Tunnel, 1994
- Pont de Normandie, 1995
- Submerged tube tunnel of the Météor, 1998
- Charles de Gaulle Airport Terminal 2F, 1999
- Lesotho Highlands Water Project, 2002

== Key management ==
- François-Xavier Clédat, Président-Directeur général
- François-Xavier Anscutter, Directeur général délégué
