= Société de Construction des Batignolles =

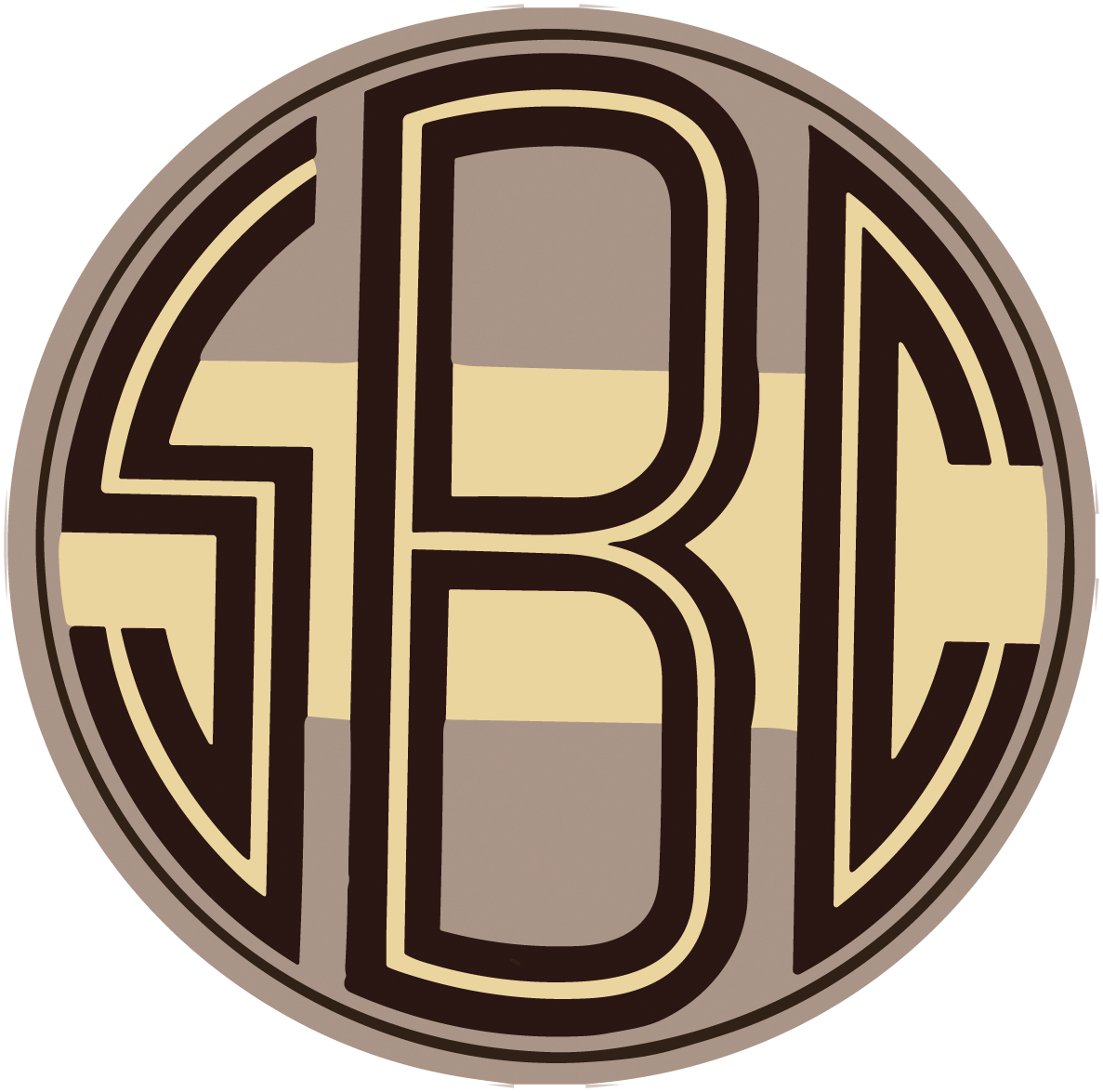
- Industry: Civil engineering
- Predecessor: Ernest Goüin et Cie. (1846)
- Successor: Spie Batignolles (1968)
- Key people: Ernest Goüin and family
- Products: Railway construction, bridges
- Subsidiaries: Compagnie générale de construction de locomotives (Batignolles-Châtillon)

The Société de Construction des Batignolles was a civil engineering company of France created in 1871 as a public limited company from the 1846 limited partnership of Ernest Gouin et Cie.. Initially founded to construct locomotives, the company produced the first iron bridge in France, and moved away from mechanical to civil engineering projects in France, North Africa, Europe, and in East Asia and South America.

In 1968 the company merged with the electrical engineering company SPIE to form Spie Batignolles. After being briefly owned by the AMEC group (2003) the civil engineering construction activities were split and sold. As of 2011, Spie Batignolles SA is the effective successor of the company.

== History ==
=== Ernest Goüin et Cie. ===
On 18 February 1847, Ernest Goüin, having gained experience in England on the manufacture of locomotives and machine tools whilst acting on behalf of the Chemin de fer de Paris à Orléans, founded the company Ernest Gouin et Cie. With the financial backing of several bankers, including James de Rothschild, the company was launched with total capital of 750,000 Francs. One of the primary reasons for the company's creation was to manufacturer locomotives for the newly formed Chemin de Fer du Nord (1845); initially the company focused on locomotive manufacture.

The company introduced the first Crampton locomotive into France, and gained orders from the not only the Chemin de Fer du Nord, but also the Paris Orléans and the Paris Lyon railways. A financial crisis (as well as the 1848 revolution) caused recession, and a drop in locomotive orders, spurring the company to diversify. One new product was production of spinning machines. Another was iron bridge manufacture, and in 1852 the company constructed France's first iron bridge. The structure, built of the Seine at Asnières had a total length of 160 metres (520 ft). Despite erratic orders the company expanded rapidly; by 1856 a second share issue doubled the capital of the company, the same year the company's revenue was 7 million francs. In 1855 the company's factory was enlarged to accommodate the construction of iron bridges. Further orders for iron bridges came from France, and abroad, giving the company work for several years, and steady growth. To compensate for the uncertainties in the locomotive building business, the company began production of steam engines, as well as shipbuilding – acquiring a large shipyard in Nantes, and became a supplier to the French Navy.

Experience with the building of iron bridges led to it undertaking related work, including the construction of foundations, and masonry. In 1862 the company entered the railway line construction field. It worked with the Compañía de los Caminos de Hierro del Norte de España constructing a 25 km (16 mi) section of a line across the Pyrenees which included many earthworks and tunnels. Railway works were also undertaken in Italy (on the Naples-Foggia line), and in Russia and Poland; including a bridge over the Vistula.

On 1 January 1872 the company was converted to a joint stock company, the Société de Construction des Batignolles.

=== Société de Construction des Batignolles ===
Conversion to a public company, the Société de Construction des Batignolles (SCB), in 1872 allowed the company to raise capital. By 1880 over 5 million francs of shares had been issued. The new company was to continue the work of Ernest Gouin et Cie.; shipbuilding, bridges and other civil engineering works, and machine and locomotive building. Ernest Goüin died in 1885, to be succeeded by his son Jules as chairman of the company.

With most mainline railways in Europe complete by the 1870s, the group's search for contracts became increasingly international. By the 1880s civil engineering was becoming the core business. The company undertook some large railway construction projects such as the construction of the line from Bône to Guelma in Algeria for the Compagnie des chemins de fer Bône-Guelma, and the line from Dakar to Saint-Louis, Senegal. These were operated as concessions by subsidiaries of the SCB. By 1913 the company had fourteen subsidiary companies located throughout the world running railways. The company also constructed canals for irrigation, ports and harbours, and water and sewerage systems. Profits from concessions in north Africa, in particular Tunisia, were high (over 25% in the 1890s), and allowed expansion without share issues or loans.

The First World War caused a halt to international civil engineering contracts, except for a line in Greece of significance to military supply. The plant in the Avenue de Clichy produced armoured cars, gun carriages, bombs, trench mortars and other war material. The peace brought opportunities for rebuilding; including a potential demand for new locomotives. In 1917 a locomotive construction company, the Compagnie générale de construction de locomotives (Batignolles-Châtillon) in Nantes was formed by the SCB and the Société des forges de Châtillon-Commentry-Neuves-Maisons. In 1928 SCB closed its factory on the Avenue de Clichy in Paris, transferring locomotive and other manufacturing to the Nantes subsidiary.

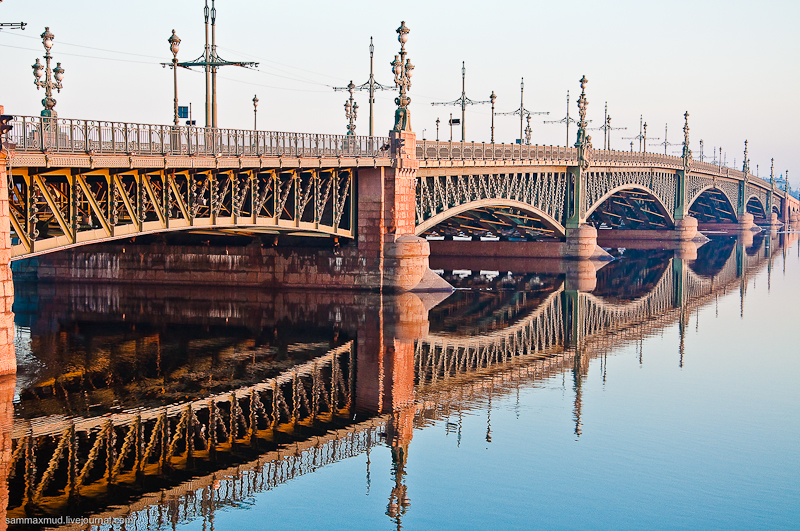
The Trinity Bridge (Saint Petersburg) was built between 1897 and 1903

After the divestment of metal manufacturing to 'Batignolles-Châtillon' most of the company's sales were overseas; one-third came from French colonies, and two-thirds from other countries, much from eastern Europe. In the interwar years the company undertook several major projects including the construction of the Port of Gdynia, and ports in Madagascar and Djibouti, the Congo-Ocean Railway (Chemin de fer Congo-Océan), and began work on a dam near Sansanding on the Niger. The construction of the Chemin de fer Congo-Océan caused a scandal as it used essentially forced labour, with a very heavy cost in life—up to 20% of the workforce in some parts.

In the years preceding the Second World War, after the 7 July 1938 law relating to industrial mobilisation in war, the SCB obtained several contracts from the French state, such as fortification constructions and armament factory constructions. The subsidiary 'Batignolles-Châtillon' also received numerous orders and expanded its factory, not only for locomotive production but also for the ministries of war. After the beginning of the war and during the German military occupation many overseas projects were halted, and work in France was much reduced. Under pressure from the Nazis, Ernest Goüin (CEO) agreed to help with the construction of the Atlantic Wall, for which he was imprisoned after the Liberation of France. He was released and returned to the position of CEO in October 1946.

The immediate postwar period was a prosperous one for SCB; the Monnet Plan allocated 50% of expenditure on civil engineering projects. Works included reconstruction of the Port of Le Havre, dams for EDF, (Note: Contracts with EDF were through the subsidiary SOTRABAS, La Société de Travaux Batignolles Savoie, a company formed to allow SCB to get contracts with EDF, in which communists help positions of power.) including the 2000GWh Barrage de Donzère-Mondragon. In Algeria the Barrage de Foum-el-Gherza was constructed. (Note: Barrage de Foum-el-Gherza, Algeria 34.852686°N 5.923836°E) In French Equatorial Africa through FIDES, (Note: FIDES : Fonds d'Investissement pour le Développement Economique et Social des Territoires d'Outre Mer, a development agency) and CAIFOM, (Note: CAIFOM : Caisse de la France d'Outre-Mer, a development agency, later known as the Caisse Centrale de la France d'Outre-Mer (CCFOM).) (and in association with Schneider SA through a limited liability joint venture SCTP. (Note: SCTP : Société Camerounaise de Travaux Publics.)) the company returned to pre-war success, such as with the extension of the port in Doula and the 1,830-metre-long (6,000 ft) bridge over the Wouri, in Cameroon. Additionally SCB agents began to seek potential contracts in South America and the Middle East; this led to work such as the extension of the port in Guayaquil, Ecuador. In South Africa the company's skill in building hyperbolic cooling towers brought orders for the subsidiary African Batignolles Construction Ltd..

By 1950 profits were not sufficient at 2.5% to cover the need for capital investments. It was the barrage in Edfina (near Metoubes, Egypt) that put SCB into financial deficit: The dam, (Note: 31.305769°N 30.519403°E Edfina barrage, constructed 1948–51.) built on the Rosetta canal was originally to be built by the Czech firm 'Hrabb Lozowski'. They were unable to complete the financial arrangements and the contract was passed to a 50/50 venture between SCB and the Netherlandsche Maatschappij Voor Haven. The Czech firm's costings turned out to be underestimates, and the attempts to re-negotiate the terms failed, additionally the unreliability of manpower due to the First Arab-Israeli war caused problems, as did poor Franco-Egyptian relations. The contract turned to litigation, but the case bogged down and by 1950 the company had already required major loans from the Crédit National d'Escompte and the Crédit Lyonnais banks. The losses were large and the company used a share issue to raise capital. On 6 May 1954 the Empain group through its holding SPIE acquired a 20% stake in the company.

After the problems in Egypt the company focused on medium-sized projects, seeking a reliable income stream, and was involved in works on the River Rhine between Basel and Strasbourg. To compensate for the loss of markets due to French decolonisation the company became more involved in Latin America, and South Africa, and was contracted to build an airport in Indonesia ("Project Waru" : Juanda International Airport). The company income grew modestly in the late 1950s. In 1962 Jean-Edouard Empain became a director of the company. The company returned to large scale projects in an attempt to improve its profitability and the company also started to undertake building and property development projects. The company was still experiencing financial problems; in 1967 operating income was negative. In 1967 was decided to merge the company with the engineering company SPIE. The merger took place in 1968 forming SPIE Batignolles.robi5018←lagao

=== Legacy ===
The company was part of Spie Batignolles; owned by the Schneider group until 1997, when it was divested as part of an AMEC leveraged management buyout. The company became Spie SA with three divisions – Spie Batignolles became the name of the construction division. The SPIE group was acquired by AMEC in 2003 the construction division was acquired in September 2003 by the management and Barclays Private Equity Finance, by 2005 the company sought to sell the other SPIE assets. The electrical engineering, and rail divisions were sold separately between 2006 and 2007.

As of 2011 Spie Batignolles continues to undertake civil engineering construction work.

== See also ==
- Alexandre Lavalley
