= List of ship launches in 1892 =

The list of ship launches in 1892 includes a chronological list of ships launched in 1892. In cases where no official launching ceremony was held, the date built or completed may be used instead.

Date	Ship	Class	Builder	Location	Country	Notes
7 January	Manitoba	Passenger ship	Harland & Wolff	Belfast	United Kingdom	For Baltimore Lighterage Co.
15 January	Kaiserin Augusta	Protected cruiser	SMAG Germania	Kiel	Germany	For #imperial German Navy.
23 January	Esmeralda	Barque	Charles Joseph Bigger	Londonderry	United Kingdom	For F. C. Wehrhahn.
29 January	Auriga	Steamship	Blyth Shipbuilding Co. Ltd	Blyth	United Kingdom	For Oriental Steamship Co. Ltd.
30 January	Grafton	Edgar-class cruiser	Thames Ironworks and Shipbuilding Company	Leamouth	United Kingdom	For Royal Navy.
5 February	Torpilleur N° 166	36-metre type Normand (1890 tranche), (Type 126 Modifié)	Forges et Chantiers de la Méditerranée	Le Havre	France	For the French Navy
2 February	Seeadler	Cruiser	Kaiserliche Werft Danzig	Danzig	Germany	For Imperial German Navy.
11 February	Narkeeta	Tug	City Point Iron Works	Boston, Massachusetts	United States	For United States Navy.
13 February	Grondeur	Véloce-class seagoing torpedo boat	Forges et Chantiers de la Méditerranée	Le Havre	France	For the French Navy
22 February	Placilla	Barque	Joh. C. Tecklenborg	Bremerhaven	Germany	For F. Laeisz.
23 February	Condor	Bussard-class cruiser	Blohm & Voss	Hamburg	Germany	For Imperial German Navy.
25 February	Mohawk	Passenger ship	Harland & Wolff	Belfast	United Kingdom	For Elder Dempster.
27 February	Lord Templemore	Barque	Harland & Wolff	Belfast	United Kingdom	For Irish Shipowners Co.
27 February	Repulse	Royal Sovereign-class battleship	Pembroke Dockyard	Pembroke	United Kingdom	For Royal Navy.
1 March	Ramillies	Royal Sovereign-class battleship	J. & G. Thomson Clyde Bank Iron Shipyard	Greenock	United Kingdom	For Royal Navy.
3 March	Wahneta	Tug	City Point Iron Works	Boston, Massachusetts	United States	For United States Navy.
9 March	Georgii Pobedonosets	Ekaterina II-class battleship	Sevastopol Shipyard	Sevastopol	Russia	For Imperial Russian Navy.
29 March	Lord Erne	Cargo ship	Harland & Wolff	Belfast	United Kingdom	For Irish Shipowners Ltd.
30 March	Crescent	Edgar-class cruiser		Portsmouth	United Kingdom	For Royal Navy.
31 March	Raleigh	Protected cruiser	Norfolk Naval Shipyard	Portsmouth, Virginia	United States	For United States Navy.
12 April	Alston	Steamship	Blyth Shipbuilding Co. Ltd	Blyth	United Kingdom	For Alston Steamship Co. Ltd.
12 April	Birkdale	Barque	Charles Joseph Bigger	Londonderry	United Kingdom	For Dale Line.
27 April	Gibraltar	Edgar-class cruiser	Napier	Glasgow	United Kingdom	For Royal Navy.
27 April	Jemmapes	Jemmapes-class coast defence ship	Ateliers et Chantiers de la Loire	Saint-Nazaire	France	For French Navy
30 April	Bancroft	Gunboat	Samuel L. Moore & Sons	Elizabethport, New Jersey	United States	For United States Navy.
30 April	William Tillie	Full-rigged ship	Charles Joseph Bigger	Londonderry	United Kingdom	For Foyle Line.
4 May	City of Ainsworth	Paddle steamer			Canada	For private owner.
11 May	Castine	Gunboat	Bath Iron Works	Bath, Maine	United States	For United States Navy.
17 May	Cormoran	Bussard-class cruiser	Kaiserliche Werft Danzig	Danzig	Germany	For Imperial German Navy.
26 May	Naronic	Steamship	Harland and Wolff	Govan	United Kingdom	For White Star Line.
28 May	Resolution	Royal Sovereign-class battleship	Palmers Shipbuilding and Iron Company	Jarrow	United Kingdom	For Royal Navy.
31 May	El Cid	Steamship	Newport News Shipbuilding	Newport News, Virginia	United States	For Southern Pacific Transportation Company.
22 June	William Mitchell	Full-rigged ship	Charles Joseph Bigger	Londonderry	United Kingdom	For Foyle Line.
23 June	St George	Edgar-class cruiser	Earle's Shipbuilding	Hull	United Kingdom	For Royal Navy.
28 June	Bovic	Steamship	Harland and Wolff	Belfast	United Kingdom	For White Star Line.
28 June	Texas	Battleship	Norfolk Naval Shipyard	Portsmouth, Virginia	United States	For United States Navy.
6 July	Akitsushima	Protected cruiser	Yokosuka Naval Arsenal	Yokosuka	Japan	For Imperial Japanese Navy.
9 July	Nurani	Cargo ship	Harland & Wolff	Belfast	United Kingdom	For Asiatic Steamship Co.
23 July	Sagamore	Steamship	American Steel Barge Company	Superior, Wisconsin	United States	For Huron Barge Company.
26 July	Columbia	Columbia-class cruiser	William Cramp & Sons	Philadelphia, Pennsylvania	United States	For United States Navy.
26 July	Unnamed	Chain ferry	W. Allsup & Sons Ltd.	Preston	United Kingdom	Gosport-Portsmouth chain ferry.
27 July	Heimdall	Siegfried-class coastal defense ship	Königliche Werft	Wilhelmshaven	Germany	For Imperial German Navy.
3 August	Centurion	Centurion-class battleship		Portsmouth	United Kingdom	For Royal Navy.
6 August	Hildebrand	Siegfried-class coastal defense ship	Kaiserliche Werft	Kiel	Germany	For Imperial German Navy.
6 August	Wörth	Brandenburg-class battleship	SMAG Germania	Kiel	Germany	For Imperial German Navy.
8 August	Mousquetaire	Seagoing torpedo boat	Forges et Chantiers de la Méditerranée	Le Havre	France	For the French Navy
10 August	Barfleur	Centurion-class battleship	Chatham Dockyard	Chatham	United Kingdom	For Royal Navy.
10 August	Gondola	Steamship	Blyth Shipbuilding Co. Ltd	Blyth	United Kingdom	For Gondola Steamship Co. Ltd.
11 August	Marblehead	Cruiser	City Point Iron Works	Boston, Massachusetts	United States	For United States Navy.
24 August	Lawhill	Barque	Caledon Shipbuilding	Dundee	United Kingdom	For Charles Barrie.
8 September	Campania	Ocean liner	Fairfield Shipbuilding and Engineering Company	Govan	United Kingdom	For Cunard Line.
8 September	Sagamore	Passenger ship	Harland & Wolff	Belfast	United Kingdom	For George Warren & Co.
8 September	Theseus	Edgar-class cruiser	Thames Ironworks and Shipbuilding Company	Leamouth	United Kingdom	For Royal Navy.
23 September	Pisagua	Barque	Joh. C. Tecklenborg	Bremerhaven	Germany	For F. Laeisz.
23 September	Bouvines	Coastal defence ship	Forges et Chantiers de la Méditerranée	La Seyne	France	For the French Navy
6 October	Nairung	Cargo ship	Harland & Wolff	Belfast	United Kingdom	For Asiatic Steamship Co.
6 October	Valmy	Jemmapes-class coast defence ship	Ateliers et Chantiers de la Loire	Saint-Nazaire	France	For French Navy
11 October	Benjamin Constant	Protected cruiser	Forges et Chantiers de la Méditerranée	La Seyne	France	For the Brazilian Navy
20 October	Dingwall	Steamship	Blyth Shipbuilding Co. Ltd	Blyth	United Kingdom	For Stephens, Mawson & Goss.
22 October	Islam	Cargo ship	Harland & Wolff	Belfast	United Kingdom	For Edward Bates & Co.
22 October	Rurik	Cruiser	Baltic Shipyard	Saint Petersburg	Russia	For Imperial Russian Navy.
22 October	Koningin Wilhelmina der Nederlanden	Protected cruiser	Rijkswerf	Amsterdam	Netherlands	For Royal Netherlands Navy.
3 November	Revenge	Royal Sovereign-class battleship	Palmers Shipbuilding and Iron Company	Jarrow	United Kingdom	For Royal Navy.
4 November	La Navarre	Ocean liner	Chantiers et Ateliers de Penhoët	Saint-Nazaire	France	For:Cie. Générale Transatlantique
5 November	Latouche-Tréville	Amiral Charner-class cruiser	Forges et Chantiers de la Méditerranée	Le Havre	France	For the French Navy
5 November	Olympia	Protected cruiser	Union Iron Works	San Francisco, California	United States	For United States Navy.
5 November	Royal Oak	Royal Sovereign-class battleship	Cammell Laird	Birkenhead	United Kingdom	For Royal Navy.
9 November	George N. Wilcox	Full-rigged ship	Charles Joseph Bigger	Londonderry	United Kingdom	For H. Hackfield & Co.
10 November	Cincinnati	Protected cruiser	New York Navy Yard	Brooklyn, New York	United States	For United States Navy.
17 November	Mobile	Cargo ship	Harland & Wolff	Belfast	United Kingdom	For African Steamship Co.
24 November	Damson Hill	Barque	Harland & Wolff	Belfast	United Kingdom	For W. J. Myers & Co.
3 December	Christopher Columbus	Passenger ship	American Steel Barge Company	Superior, Wisconsin	United States	For Columbian Whaleback Steamship Company.
7 December	Orellana	Passenger ship	Harland & Wolff	Belfast	United Kingdom	For Pacific Steam Navigation Company.
19 December	John Cooke	Full-rigged ship	Charles Joseph Bigger	Londonderry	United Kingdom	For Foyle Line.
20 December	Yoshino	Cruiser	Armstrong Mitchell	Newcastle upon Tyne	United Kingdom	For Imperial Japanese Navy.
22 December	Antisana	Cargo ship	Harland & Wolff	Belfast	United Kingdom	For Pacific Steam Navigation Company.
Unknown date	Annerly	Sternwheeler		Jennings, Montana	United States	For Dupuy & Jones.
Unknown date	City of Taunton	Paddle steamer		Chelsea, Massachusetts	United States	For Fall River Line.
Unknown date	Abarenda	Collier	Edwards Shipbuilding Company	Newcastle upon Tyne	United Kingdom	For private owner.
Unknown date	Comanche	Yacht	Globe Iron Works	Cleveland, Ohio	United States	For H. M. Hanna.
Unknown date	Duke of Clarence	Passenger ship	Cammell Laird	Birkenhead	United Kingdom	Lancashire & Yorkshire and London & North Western Railways.
Unknown date	El Sud	Steamship	Newport News Shipbuilding	Newport News, Virginia	United States	For Southern Pacific Transportation Company.
Unknown date	Fearless	Tug	Union Iron Works	San Francisco, California	United States	For J. D. Spreckles Brothers & Co.
Unknown date	Fram	Steam schooner	Colin Archer	Larvik	Norway	For Fridtjof Nansen.
Unknown date	Heimdal	Royal yacht	Akers mekaniske Verksted	Kristiania	Norway	For Oscar II.
Unknown date	Hyak	Sternwheeler		Golden	Canada	For Upper Colombia Navigation & Tramway Co.
Unknown date	Ilma	Steam yacht	W. Allsup & Sons Ltd.	Preston	United Kingdom	For George W. Anderson.
Unknown date	P H Wise	Tug	Neafie & LevyPhiladelphia, Pennsylvania		United States	For private owner.
Unknown date	Penwood	Tug	Maryland Steel Company	Baltimore, Maryland	United States	For private owner.
Unknown date	Primrose	Oyster dredger	Aldous & Son	Brightlingsea	United Kingdom	For private owner.
Unknown date	Ramona	Sternwheeler		Portland, Oregon	United States	For Graham Steamboat Line.
Unknown date	Regina	Fishing trawler	John Bell	Grimsby	United Kingdom	For John Bell and others.
Unknown date	Richard Peck		Harlan and Hollingsworth	Wilmington, Delaware	United States	For private owner.
Unknown date	Yarrowdale	Cargo ship	William Pickersgill & Sons	Sunderland	United Kingdom	For Robert Mackill & Co.
