= Naval fleet =

Largest naval formation of warships controlled by a single leader

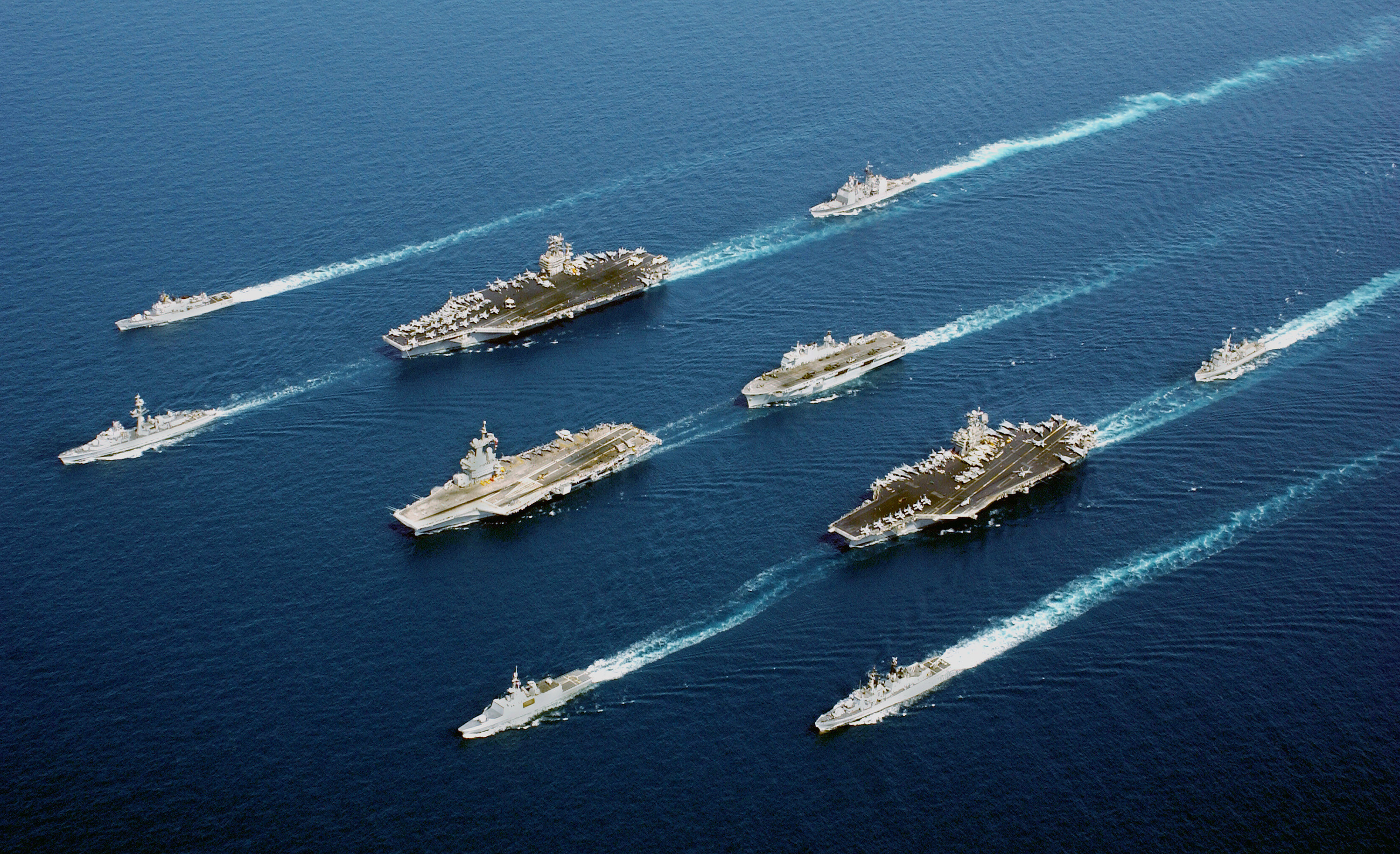
A rare occurrence of a 5-country multinational fleet, during Operation Enduring Freedom in the Oman Sea. In four descending columns, from left to right: Maestrale, De Grasse; USS John C. Stennis, Charles de Gaulle, Surcouf; USS Port Royal, HMS Ocean, USS John F. Kennedy, HNLMS Van Amstel ; and Luigi Durand de la Penne

A naval fleet is the largest operational formation of warships in a particular navy, either national or otherwise, typically under a single command and organized for strategic missions. While modern fleets are permanent, multi-role forces (e.g., carrier strike groups), historical fleets were often ad hoc assemblies for specific campaigns. The term "fleet" can also synonymously refer to a nation’s entire navy, particularly in smaller maritime forces.

Fleets have shaped geopolitics since antiquity—from the trireme fleets of Athens to the nuclear-powered carrier groups of today—enabling power projection, trade protection, and deterrence. Multinational fleets, such as NATO’s Standing Maritime Groups, demonstrate their continued diplomatic-military role.

== Historical development ==
=== Ancient and medieval fleets ===
The earliest organized naval fleets emerged in the Eastern Mediterranean and East Asia, where maritime trade routes and coastal warfare necessitated centralized naval power.

==== Mediterranean ====
- Phoenicians (1500–300 BCE): Established the first permanent war fleets, using biremes to dominate Levantine trade routes. Their shipbuilding techniques were later adopted by Greek city-states.
- Classical Greece: The Athenian-led Delian League relied on triremes—oared warships with bronze rams—to defeat Persia at Salamis (480 BCE) and maintain Aegean hegemony.
- Rome: The Classis Britannica patrolled Britain’s coasts, while the Battle of Actium (31 BCE) demonstrated Rome’s transition from ad hoc fleets to permanent provincial squadrons.

==== East Asia ====
- China: The Han dynasty (206 BCE–220 CE) deployed riverine fleets to suppress rebellions, while the Ming treasure voyages (1405–1433) under Zheng He projected power as far as East Africa.
- Japan: The Mongol invasions (1274–1281) spurred Kamakura Japan to develop coastal defense fleets, though naval power remained secondary to samurai warfare.

==== Medieval Europe ====
- Byzantium: The dromon, equipped with Greek fire, secured Byzantine dominance until the 12th century.
- Vikings: Their longship fleets enabled raids from Newfoundland to the Caspian Sea (793–1066 CE).

=== Age of Sail (1500-1850) ===
The transition from oar-powered galleys to wind-driven sailing warships revolutionized naval warfare, enabling global empires and standardized fleet tactics.

==== Ship design ====
- Galleons (16th c.): Combined cargo capacity with broadside artillery (e.g., Spanish Manila galleons).
- Ships of the line (17th–18th c.): Multi-decked vessels like Britain’s HMS Victory mounted 50–100 guns.

==== Tactical innovations ====
- Line of battle: Adopted after the Battle of the Downs (1639), requiring fleets to fight in disciplined columns.
- Signaling systems: The Royal Navy’s 1790 Signal Book enabled complex fleet maneuvers.

==== Major fleet engagements ====
- Lepanto (1571): Last great galley battle; Holy League’s 200+ ships defeated Ottomans using boarding tactics.
- Trafalgar (1805): Nelson’s unconventional "breaking the line" tactic crushed Franco-Spanish forces.

==== Global reach ====
- Dutch: Protected trade in the East Indies (e.g., VOC’s 100+ ship fleet).
- Chinese shachuan: Ming/Qing coastal fleets countered Japanese wokou pirates.

=== Industrial Age (1850-1914) ===
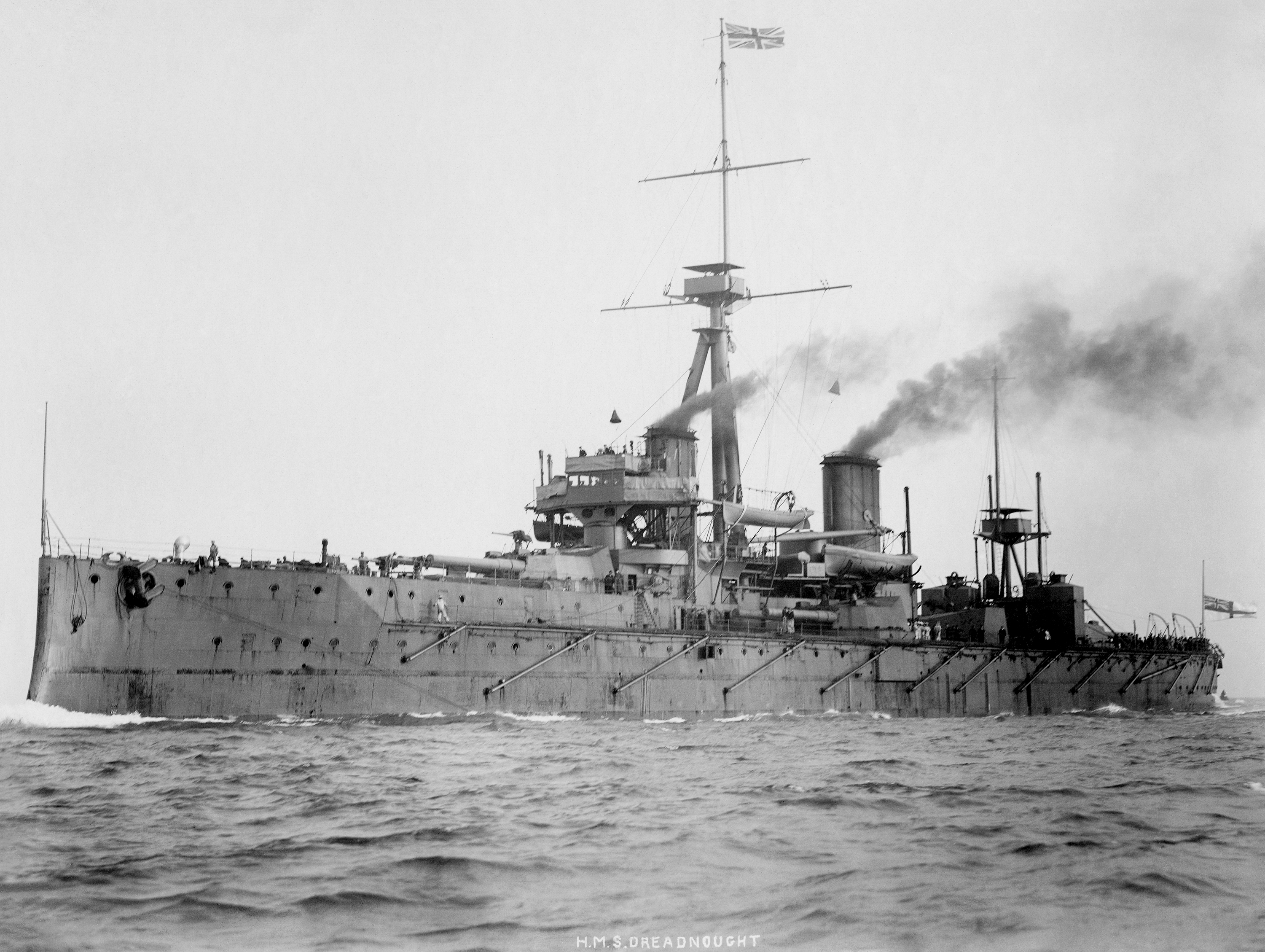
HMS Dreadnought (1906)

The Industrial Revolution fundamentally altered fleet composition and strategy, replacing wooden sailing ships with steam-powered ironclads and dreadnoughts, while enabling global naval dominance by industrialized powers.

==== Propulsion transition ====
- HMS Warrior (1860): Britain’s first iron-hulled warship, rendering wooden fleets obsolete.
- Triple-expansion engines (1880s): Extended operational range (e.g., USS Oregon’s 14,000-mile voyage in 1898).

==== Armament advances ====
- Breech-loading guns: Increased firepower (e.g., French Canon de 340 mm).
- Torpedoes (1870s): Forced fleets to adopt anti-torpedo nets and destroyer escorts.

Comparative Table: Ironclad vs. Pre-Industrial Fleets
Feature	Wooden sail fleet (1800)	Industrial fleet (1900)
Hull material	Oak timber	Steel armor (Krupp cemented)
Armament	32-pounder smoothbores	12-inch breech-loading rifles
Speed	8 knots (dependent on wind)	18 knots (steam-powered)

==== Strategic shifts ====
- Coal stations: Fleets depended on global coaling networks (e.g., Britain’s Stations and Dockyards).
- Naval staffs: Professionalized command (e.g., Germany’s Admiralstab vs. Britain’s Admiralty War Staff).

==== Key fleet actions ====
- Battle of Lissa (1866): Austrian ironclad fleet defeated Italy using ramming tactics.
- Sino-Japanese War (1894): Japan’s modernized fleet annihilated China’s Beiyang Fleet at Yalu River.

==== Colonial fleets ====
- "Gunboat diplomacy": Small fleets projected power (e.g., US Asiatic Squadron in Japan 1853).

=== Cold War to Present (1945-present) ===
The nuclear revolution and digital technologies transformed fleets into global power-projection systems, dominated by carrier groups and submarines while integrating space and cyber capabilities.

==== Fleet revolution (1945-1991) ====
===== Nuclear navies =====
- USS Nautilus (1954): First nuclear submarine enabled indefinite underwater patrols, making fleets unstoppable second-strike platforms.
- SSBNs: Soviet Project 667B and US Ohio-class created undersea nuclear deterrents.

===== Carrier dominance =====
- US "Supercarriers" (Forrestal-class to Nimitz-class) projected air power globally (e.g., Gulf War sorties).
- Soviet Kiev-class: Hybrid carriers countered NATO with P-500 missiles.

===== Fleet tactics =====
- A2/AD Zones: Soviet Bastion Defense protected SSBNs near Murmansk.
- US maritime strategy: Forward-deployed carrier groups threatened Soviet coasts.

==== Post-Cold War (1991-2020) ====
===== Expeditionary fleets =====
- Amphibious Ready Groups (ARGs): Critical for Iraq/Afghanistan logistics.
- Littoral combat ships: Failed to counter Iranian swarm tactics in Persian Gulf.

===== China's Rise =====
- PLAN Carrier Program: Liaoning (2012) to Fujian (2022) challenged US Pacific dominance.
- Anti-carrier systems: DF-21D "carrier-killer" missiles forced USN to adopt Distributed Maritime Operations.

==== Emerging trends (2020-present) ====
===== Hybrid fleets =====
- Unmanned vessels: USN’s Ghost Fleet Overlord and China’s Type 022 drones.
- Space integration: Satellite-linked NIFC-CA targeting (USN) vs. PLA’s Tianlian system.

===== Arctic competition =====
- Russian Northern Fleet reactivated Soviet-era bases (e.g., Alexandria Land).
- US 2nd Fleet reconstituted for North Atlantic.

Fleet size comparison (2025)
Nation	Carriers	SSBNs	Destroyers	Unmanned vessels
USA	11	14	81	120+
China	3	6	50	60+
Russia	1	11	10	20+

== Composition and organization ==
=== Command structure hierarchy ===
Modern naval fleets employ distinct organizational models tailored to strategic needs, ranging from numbered fleets (U.S. system) to geographic commands (commonwealth/European systems).

==== National models ====
===== United States Navy =====
- Numbered fleets:
  - Odd numbers (3rd, 5th, 7th) = Pacific Fleet
  - Even numbers (2nd, 4th, 6th) = Atlantic Fleet
  - Exception: 10th Fleet (Cyber Command)
- Chain of command:
  - Fleet Commander (ADM/VADM) → Task Force Commander (RADM) → Task Group Leader

===== Royal Navy =====
- Geographic commands:
  - Carrier Strike Group (CSG21) → Fleet Commander (NORTHWOOD HQ).
  - Historic fleets (Home Fleet, Mediterranean Fleet) consolidated into Strike Force (2019).

===== People's Liberation Army Navy (PLAN) =====
- Theater commands:
  - Northern//Eastern/Southern Theater Fleets report directly to CMC.
  - Unique feature: Political commissars equal in rank to operational commanders.

Command ranks by navy
Role	USN rank	(Royal Navy) RN rank	PLAN rank
Fleet commander	Admiral (O-10)	Vice-admiral (OF-8)	Rear admiral (Chinese: 海军少将; pinyin: Hǎijūn shao jiang)
Task force lead	Rear admiral (O-8)	Commodore (OF-6)	Senior captain (Chinese: 海军大校; pinyin: Hǎijūn da xiao)

==== Multinational structures ====
===== NATO =====
- SNMG1/2 (Surface Groups) rotate command among member states.
- Commanders typically hold Commodore (1-star) rank.

=== Ship types and roles ===
Modern fleets integrate specialized vessels to fulfill strategic, operational, and tactical objectives. Since World War II, fleets have transitioned from battleship-centered formations to carrier strike groups (CSGs) and submarine-centric forces, with evolving roles for surface combatants and auxiliaries.

==== Capital ships ====
===== Aircraft carriers =====
- Role: Power projection via air dominance (70+ aircraft).
- Examples:
  - USN Ford-class (100,000t, EMALS launch).
  - PLAN Fujian (80,000t, electromagnetic catapults).
- Limitations: Vulnerable to hypersonic missiles (e.g., Russian Zircon).

===== Ballistic missile submarines (SSBNs) =====
- Role: Nuclear deterrent (e.g., US Ohio-class carries 24 Trident II missiles).
- Stealth: Patrols at <20 dB (quieter than ambient sea noise).

==== Escorts ====
Type	Role	Example vessels
Destroyer	Air defense (AEGIS systems)	Arleigh Burke-class (US), Type 055 (China)
Frigate	ASW/convoy protection	Admiral Gorshkov-class (Russia), FREMM (EU)
Corvette	Coastal warfare	Visby-class (Sweden), Kamorta-class (India)

==== Support vessels ====
===== Auxiliaries =====
- Fast Combat Support Ships (e.g., USNS Supply-class) provide underway replenishment.
- Hospital ships (Mercy-class) comply with Geneva Conventions.

===== Unmanned =====
- USV Sea Hunter (anti-submarine drone).
- PLAN Type 022 (missile boat replacement).

== See also ==
- List of fleets
