= French ship Valmy =

At least three ships of the French Navy have been named Valmy:

- French ship Valmy, a 120-gun ship of the line launched in 1847, renamed Borda in 1863 and again renamed as Intrépide in 1890. She was scrapped in 1891.
- French ironclad Valmy, a Jemmapes-class coastal defense ship, launched in April 1892 and scrapped after 1911.
- French destroyer Valmy, a Guépard-class destroyer launched in 1928 and scuttled in 1942.
