= French cruiser Chasseloup-Laubat =

Protected cruiser of the French Navy

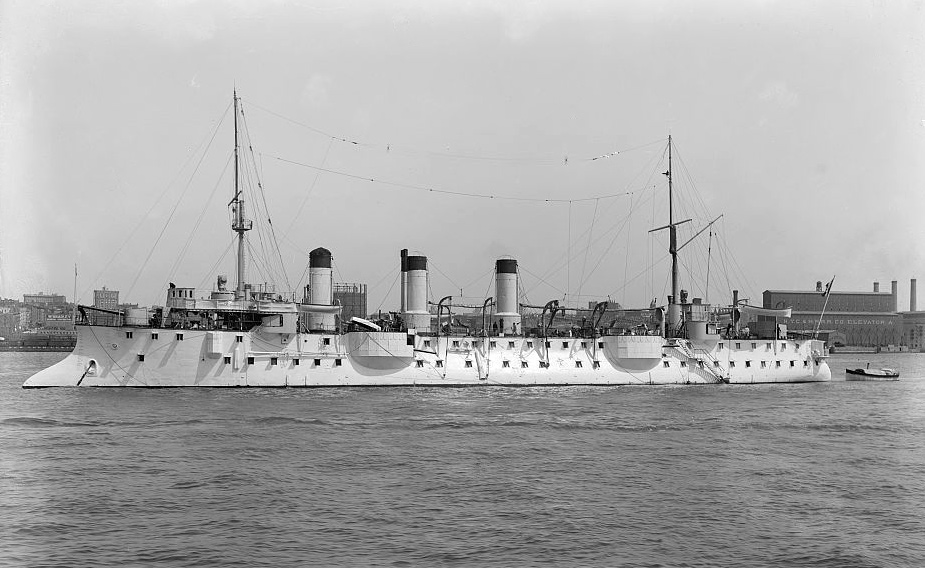
- Chasseloup-Laubat during a visit to the United States in 1907

History

France
- Name: Chasseloup-Laubat
- Ordered: 17 November 1890
- Builder: Arsenal de Cherbourg
- Laid down: 29 October 1891
- Launched: 17 April 1893
- Commissioned: 15 September 1894
- In service: 25 June 1895

History
- Decommissioned: 22 February 1910
- Stricken: 20 February 1911

History
- Recommissioned: 16 June 1915
- Fate: Abandoned in Nouadhibou Bay, 1926
- Notes: Sold, 26 October 1920

General characteristics
- Class & type: Friant-class cruiser
- Displacement: 3,771 t (3,711 long tons; 4,157 short tons)
- Length: 97.5 m (319 ft 11 in) loa
- Beam: 13.24 m (43 ft 5 in)
- Draft: 5.84 m (19 ft 2 in)
- Installed power: 20–24 × water-tube boilers; 9,000 indicated horsepower (6,700 kW)
- Propulsion: 2 × triple-expansion steam engines; 2 × screw propellers
- Speed: 18.5 knots (34.3 km/h; 21.3 mph)
- Range: 6,000 nmi (11,000 km; 6,900 mi) at 10 kn (19 km/h; 12 mph)
- Complement: 331
- Armament: 6 × 164 mm (6.5 in) guns; 4 × 100 mm (3.9 in) guns; 4 × 47 mm (1.9 in) guns; 11 × 37 mm (1.5 in) guns; 2 × 350 mm (14 in) torpedo tubes
- Armor: Deck: 30 to 80 mm (1.2 to 3.1 in); Conning tower: 75 mm (3 in); Gun shields: 50 mm (2 in)

Chasseloup-Laubat was a protected cruiser of the Friant class built in the 1890s for the French Navy, the last of three ships of the class. The Friant-class cruisers were ordered as part of a construction program directed at strengthening the fleet's cruiser force. At the time, France was concerned with the growing naval threat of the Italian and German fleets, and the new cruisers were intended to serve with the main fleet, and overseas in the French colonial empire. Chasseloup-Laubat and her two sister ships were armed with a main battery of six 164 mm (6.5 in) guns, were protected by an armor deck that was 30 to 80 mm (1.2 to 3.1 in) thick, and were capable of steaming at a top speed of 18.7 knots (34.6 km/h; 21.5 mph).

Chasseloup-Laubat spent her early career in the Northern Squadron, which was based in the English Channel. During this period, her time was primarily occupied conducting training exercises. She was sent to East Asia in response to the Boxer Uprising in Qing China by 1901, and she remained there through 1902. Chasseloup-Laubat had returned to France at some point before 1907, and she participated in a visit to the United States that year for the Jamestown Exposition. She served with the Northern Squadron in 1908, was hulked in 1911, and disarmed in 1913. After the start of World War I in 1914, Chasseloup-Laubat was converted into a distilling ship to support the main French fleet at Corfu. She was eventually sunk in 1926 in the bay of Nouadhibou, Mauritania.

== Design ==
Plan and profile drawing of the Friant class

In response to a war scare with Italy in the late 1880s, the French Navy embarked on a major construction program in 1890 to counter the threat of the Italian fleet and that of Italy's ally Germany. The plan called for a total of seventy cruisers for use in home waters and overseas in the French colonial empire. The Friant class was the first group of protected cruisers to be authorized under the program.

Chasseloup-Laubat was 94 m (308 ft 5 in) long between perpendiculars and 97.5 m (320 ft) long overall, with a beam of 13.24 m (43 ft 5 in) and an average draft of 5.84 m (19 ft 2 in). She displaced 3,771 t (3,711 long tons; 4,157 short tons) as designed. Her crew consisted of 331 officers and enlisted men. The ship's propulsion system consisted of a pair of triple-expansion steam engines driving two screw propellers. Steam was provided by twenty coal-burning Lagrafel d'Allest water-tube boilers that were ducted into three funnels. Her machinery was rated to produce 9,000 indicated horsepower (6,700 kW) for a top speed of 18.5 knots (34.3 km/h; 21.3 mph), though the ship slightly exceeded those figures during initial speed testing, reaching a speed of 18.77 knots (34.76 km/h; 21.60 mph) from 9,811 ihp (7,316 kW). She had a cruising range of 6,000 nautical miles (11,000 km; 6,900 mi) at a speed of 10 knots (19 km/h; 12 mph).

The ship was armed with a main battery of six 164 mm (6.5 in) 45-caliber guns. They were placed in individual pivot mounts; one was on the forecastle, two were in sponsons abreast the conning tower, and the last was on the stern. These were supported by a secondary battery of four 100 mm (3.9 in) guns, which were carried in pivot mounts in the conning towers, one on each side per tower. For close-range defense against torpedo boats, she carried four 47 mm (1.9 in) 3-pounder Hotchkiss guns and eleven 37 mm (1.5 in) 1-pounder guns. She was also armed with two 350 mm (14 in) torpedo tubes in her hull above the waterline. Armor protection consisted of a curved armor deck that was 30 to 80 mm (1.2 to 3.1 in) thick, along with 75 mm (3 in) plating on the conning tower.

=== Modifications ===
Chasseloup-Laubat underwent a series of minor modifications to her armament over the course of her career. Between 1900 and 1902, her light battery was changed to six 47 mm guns and three 37 mm guns. In 1907, her torpedo tubes were removed.

== Service history ==
Chasseloup-Laubat early in her career

The contract for Chasseloup-Laubat was placed on 17 November 1890. The ship was built in Cherbourg, beginning with her keel laying at the Arsenal de Cherbourg on 29 October 1891. She was launched on 17 April 1893, the same day as her sister ship Friant, and was commissioned to begin sea trials on 15 September 1894. She was placed in full commission on 25 June 1895. At some point early in her career, she was fitted with bilge keels to improve her stability. The ship was ready in time to participate in the annual fleet maneuvers with the Northern Squadron that began on 1 July 1895. The exercises took place in two phases, the first being a simulated amphibious assault in Quiberon Bay, and the second revolving around a blockade of Rochefort and Cherbourg. The maneuvers concluded on the afternoon of 23 July.

In 1896, she was assigned to the Northern Squadron, based in the English Channel. The unit was France's secondary battle fleet, and at that time, it also included the ironclad Hoche and four coastal defense ships, the armored cruiser Dupuy de Lôme, and the protected cruisers Friant and Coëtlogon. She took part in the maneuvers that year, which were conducted from 6 to 26 July in conjunction with the local defense forces of Brest, Rochefort, Cherbourg, and Lorient. The squadron was divided into three divisions for the maneuvers, and Chasseloup-Laubat was assigned to the 2nd Division along with the coastal defense ships Valmy and Jemmapes and the aviso Salve, which represented part of the defending French squadron.

Chasseloup-Laubat and both of her sister ships had been deployed to East Asia by January 1901 as part of the response to the Boxer Uprising in Qing China; at that time, six other cruisers were assigned to the station in addition to the three Friant-class ships. She remained in East Asian waters in 1902. She had returned to France at some point before 1907, when she embarked on a visit to the United States in company with the armored cruisers Victor Hugo and Kléber. The three ships departed Lorient on 8 May for Jamestown, Virginia, to participate in the Jamestown Exposition. By 20 May, they were visiting New York City; the ships returned to Jamestown on 31 May where they participated in the naval review presided over by President Theodore Roosevelt on 10 June. They returned to France later that month.

In 1908, when she was assigned to 3rd Division of the Northern Squadron, along with the cruiser Descartes and the armored cruiser Kléber. By that time, the squadron included another seven armored cruisers and two other protected cruisers. During a dry docking that year, shipyard workers found Chasseloup-Laubat's hull to be badly weakened. She was placed in reserve on 1 January 1909, was decommissioned on 22 February 1910, and was struck from the naval register on 20 February 1911. She was thereafter hulked for use in a variety of roles. She served with the school for engine and boiler room crews and the school for divers from February 1912 to 1914. In the former role, she replaced the old unprotected cruiser Milan, which had some of her boilers removed and installed aboard Chasseloup-Laubat for training purposes. After the start of World War I, Chasseloup-Laubat was converted into a water distilling ship to support the Gallipoli campaign. She was recommissioned on 16 June 1915 for that role, and was towed to Mudros by the transport SS Vinh Long on 29 July. After operations at Gallipoli ceased, Chasseloup-Laubat was towed to the main French fleet anchorage at Corfu in January 1917, remaining there until January 1919.

She was then transferred to Port Etienne to supply the French colony with water in May 1919. For budgetary reasons, the Ministry of the Navy decommissioned the cruiser and sold her to the French fishery "Société Industrielle de la Grande Pêche" in 1921. She was used as a floating warehouse and as a cistern for drinking water brought once a month from the Canary Islands. She was ultimately sunk in 1926 and became the first ship to be abandoned in the bay of Nouadhibou, Mauritania.
