= SS Yarrowdale =

At least three steamships have been called Yarrowdale. Each bore the name when owned by Robert MacKill & Co of Glasgow, who may have named them after the valley of Yarrow Water in southern Scotland. All three ships were later renamed.

- USS Long Beach (AK-9) was built as Yarrowdale in 1892, renamed Nicolaos Castriotis in 1902, Hohenfelde in 1912, Long Beach in 1917, and scrapped in 1924.
- Aoki Maru was built as Boukadra in 1910, renamed Yarrowdale in 1929, Sung-Shan in 1935, Amba Alagi in 1938 and Aoki Maru in 1941, and sunk in 1944.
- SMS Leopard (1917) was built as Yarrowdale in 1912, captured in 1916, converted into the German commerce raider Leopard, and sunk in 1917.
