= French ironclad Jemmapes =

Coastal defense battleship of the French Navy

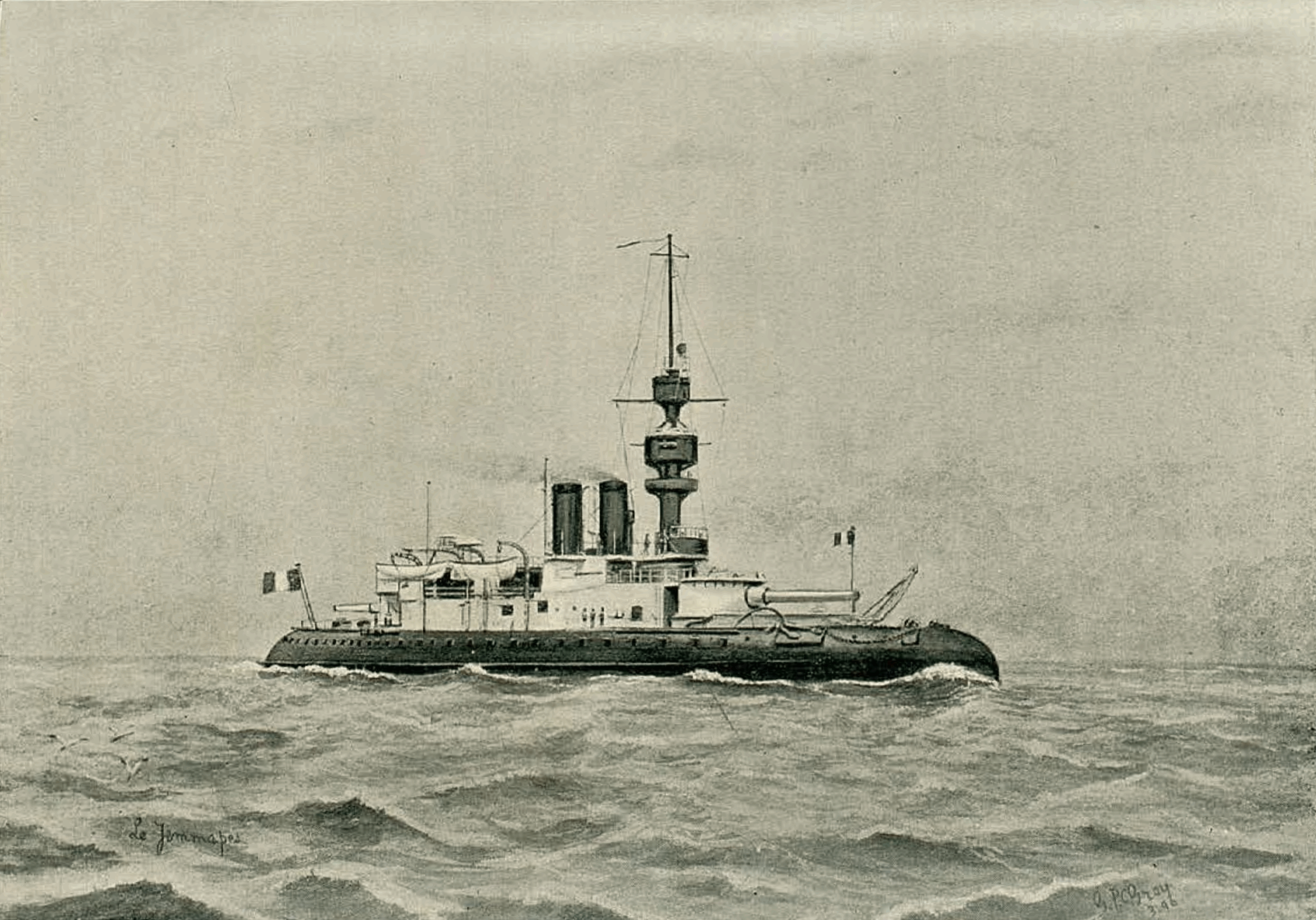
- Jemmapes in 1895

History

France
- Name: Jemmapes
- Ordered: 18 December 1889
- Builder: Ateliers et Chantiers de la Loire, Saint-Nazaire and Saint-Denis
- Laid down: 26 December 1889
- Launched: 27 April 1892
- Commissioned: 4 March 1895
- Decommissioned: 22 March 1910
- Stricken: 3 August 1910
- Fate: Sold to be broken up 5 November 1927

General characteristics
- Class & type: Jemmapes-class coastal defense ship
- Displacement: 6,579 t (6,475 long tons) (deep load)
- Length: 89.6 m (294 ft 0 in) (o/a)
- Beam: 17.48 m (57 ft 4 in)
- Draft: 6.71 m (22.0 ft)
- Installed power: 16 × Belleville boilers; 8,400 ihp (6,300 kW)
- Propulsion: 2 shafts, 2 triple-expansion steam engines
- Speed: 15 kn (28 km/h; 17 mph)
- Range: 2,667 nmi (4,939 km; 3,069 mi) at 11 kn (20 km/h; 13 mph)
- Complement: 299
- Armament: 2 × single 340 mm (13 in) guns; 4 × single 100 mm (3.9 in) QF guns; 6 × single 47 mm (1.9 in) QF guns; 8 × single 37 mm (1.5 in) Hotchkiss revolver cannon; 2 × 450 mm (18 in) torpedo tubes
- Armor: Belt: 310–460 mm (12.2–18.1 in); Deck: 60–100 mm (2–4 in); Conning tower: 80 mm (3.1 in); Turrets: 450 mm (17.7 in)

Jemmapes was the lead ship of a class of two coastal defense ships built for the French Navy (Marine Nationale) in the 1890s. Launched in 1892, the vessel joined the Northern Squadron of the French Navy (Esadre du Nord) at Brest. Armed with a main armament of two 340 mm (13.4 in) guns, the vessel was designed within the principles of the Jeune École. The ship initially joined the Northern Squadron, which was called, "the most homogenous and dangerous squadron that one could meet at sea". In 1902, the vessel was subject to underway replenishment when coal was transferred from the bunkers of other battleships during a naval exercise with the Mediterranean Squadron. Jemmapes also took part in large naval exercises in 1895 and 1900 but otherwise had an uneventful career as French naval doctrine moved from a fleet of smaller coastal defense ships to larger ocean-going battleships. The ship was decommissioned in 1910 and served as a hulk before being sold in 1927 to be broken up.

== Design and description ==
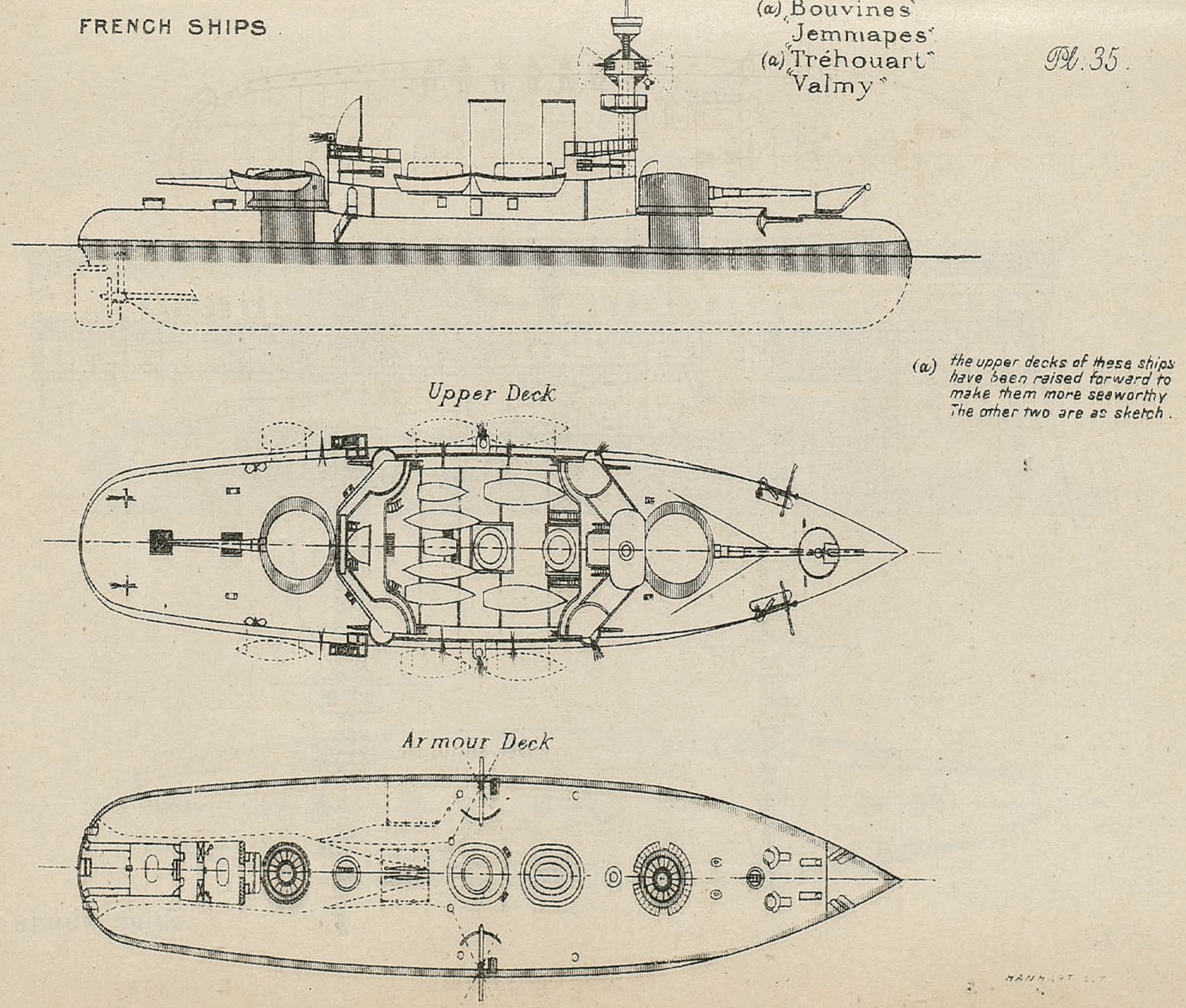
Plan view of the Jemmapes class

A larger and more capable design based on the French ironclad Furieux launched in 1883, Jemmapes was the lead ship of a class of two coastal defense ships designed by Louis de Bussy for the French Navy (Marine Nationale) as part of a wider adoption of the principles of Jeune École. The design was to have a similar level of armament, armour, draught and fuel storage as the preceding design but with a more modern powerplant based on Belleville boilers that would provide an increase in speed to 16 kn (30 km/h; 18 mph). The design proposal was accepted by the Board of Construction (Conseil de travaux) on 26 February 1889, finalised on 2 July and approved by the Minister of the Navy (Ministère de la Marine) Jules François Émile Krantz on 6 July.

Jemmapes had an overall length of 89.6 m (294 ft 0 in), 89.35 m (293 ft 2 in) at the waterline and 86.535 m (283 ft 10.9 in) between perpendiculars, a beam of 17.48 m (57 ft 4 in) at the waterline and a mean draught of 6.71 m (22 ft 0 in) at deep load. The vessel displaced 6,579 metric tons (6,475 long tons) and had a ship's complement that numbered 299 sailors of all ranks.

Jemmapes was powered by two triple-expansion steam engines that each drove one propeller shaft using steam provided by 16 Lagrafel and d'Allest Belleville boilers. The engine was rated at 8,400 indicated horsepower (6,300 kW) at 108rpm. While undertaking sea trials, Jemmapes reached a speed of 15.68 knots (29.0 km/h; 18.0 mph) from 9,118 ihp (6,799 kW). In service, speed was restricted as a bow wave was created at 13 knots (24 km/h; 15 mph) which, by 15 knots (28 km/h; 17 mph) became impossible to push forward, meaning this became the de facto maximum speed. The ship carried 335 tonnes (330 long tons; 369 short tons) of coal, which gave a range of 2,667 nautical miles (4,939 km; 3,069 mi) at a cruising speed of 10.9 knots (20.2 km/h; 12.5 mph). The maximum load of coal was 350.84 tonnes (345.30 long tons; 386.73 short tons). Once in service, a range of 1,000 nautical miles (1,900 km; 1,200 mi) at 14 knots (25.9 km/h; 16.1 mph) was claimed.

Jemmapes carried a main battery of two Canon de 340 mm (13.4 in) Modèle 1887 guns in a two single-gun turrets, one forward of the superstructure and the other aft. The guns were manually-loaded and fired one round every five minutes, but this was sped up between 1900 and 1902 with new equipment. Secondary armament was provided by four 100 mm (3.9 in) 45-calibre M1891 QF guns mounted at the corners of the shelter deck. Defence from torpedo boats was provided by six Canon de 47 mm (1.9 in) Modèle 1885 Hotchkiss guns and eight 37-millimetre (1.5 in) Hotchkiss revolving cannon.

The ship had a full-length waterline armor belt that tapered from the maximum thickness of 460 mm (18 in) amidships to 410 mm (16 in) aft and 310 mm (12 in) forward. The belt was 1.9 m (75 in) high amidships. The armor was hammered steel on the port side and compound armor on the starboard. The turrets were protected by 450 mm (18 in) thick compound armor that was mounted on fixed bases 400 mm (16 in) thick while the gun shields for the secondary armament was provided by hammered steel armor 80 mm (3.1 in) thick. The main deck was protected by 50-millimeter (2 in) thick iron plates. The laminated steel plates protecting the conning tower measured 80 mm (3.1 in) in thickness.

== Construction and career ==
Ordered on 18 December 1889 from Ateliers et Chantiers de la Loire of Saint-Nazaire and Saint-Denis, Jemmapes was laid down on 26 December, and launched on 27 April 1892. The vessel cost £525,000. The ship's machinery was fully installed on 3 July 1893 and the vessel was moved to Brest on 24 December. Initially commissioned for trials on 19 January 1884, Jemmapes had to wait until her machinery was accepted on 31 January the following year before being fully commissioned on 4 March. She joined the Northern Squadron (Esadre du Nord) of the French Navy 12 days later. On 12 March, as part of the naval budget debate, Vice Admiral Armand Bernard declared that the squadron, which included three other ships alongside Jemmapes, was "the most homogenous and dangerous squadron that one could meet at sea". They were considered more than equal to their smaller German contemporaries, the Odin class and Siegfried class.

Jemmapes had a generally uneventful career. Between 1 and 23 July 1895, the vessel took part in a large naval exercise in the Atlantic Ocean as part of the Northern Squadron. The manoeuvres included a forced landing at Quiberon and a mock blockade and attack on Cherbourg and Rochefort. The vessel served as part of the defending force, which was successful in resisting the attack. The ship also took part in the maneuvers the following year, conducted from 6 to 26 July in conjunction with the local defense forces of Brest, Rochefort, Cherbourg, and Lorient. The squadron was divided into three divisions for the maneuvers, and Jemmapes was assigned to the 2nd Division along with her sister ship Valmy, the cruiser Chasseloup-Laubat and the aviso Salve, which represented part of the defending French squadron. In 1898, the vessel was based at Toulon as part of a Reserve Fleet.

At the end of the century, the vessel was part of the Coastal Defence Division alongside the ironclads Amiral Tréhouart, Bouvines and Valmy. The four ships of the division were transferred to the Mediterranean to support the Mediterranean Squadron. The combined fleet arrived on 5 July 1900 in Quiberon Bay for exercises against the Northern Squadron. Prior to the exercise, Jemmapes suffered from boiler troubles but these did not hinder the exercise. This was followed, on 19 July, by a fleet review in front of Émile Loubet, the President of France. In 1902, the ship joined the Northern Squadron as part of an exercise in the Mediterranean. On 7 July, the squadron left its moorings off Lisbon and simulated an assault on the Mediterranean Squadron, which included a simulated on attack on Tunis on 29 July. During the exercise, on 31 July, Jemmapes required underway replenishment and coal was ferried across from the other battleships' bunkers by boats. The operation took two and a half hours. On 15 September, the submarine Espadon successfully conducted a torpedo attack on the ship while submerged during an exercise simulating a blockade of Cherbourg. On 16 October, the vessel then undertook more manoeuvres with French submarines off the coast of Barfleur, but this time the ship was able to make sufficient speed to avoid being attacked.

Meanwhile, French naval doctrine was changing and the focus on coastal defense was being replaced by one of larger sea-going warships. The size of ships was also increasing, and newer, more capable battleships entered service. Jemmapes was briefly decommissioned. Following repairs, the ship continued to operate successfully during trials in the following year. The ship was transferred to reserve at Cherbourg, returning to service at Brest on 20 September 1909 for just over two months before being briefly transferred to Rochefort on 9 December. The vessel was decommissioned at Rochefort on 22 March 1910 and struck on 3 August. Jemmapes served as a hulk for more than a decade until she was sold to Société Goldenberg on 5 November 1927 to be broken up.

== Bibliography ==
- Brassey, Thomas, ed. (1897). "Part II: British and Foreign Armoured and Unarmoured Ships". The Naval Annual 1897. Portsmouth: J. Griffin & Co.: 227–335. OCLC 1342523853.
- Brassey, Thomas A. (1899). "Chapter III: Relative Strength". The Naval Annual. Portsmouth: J. Griffin & Co.: 70–80. OCLC 496786828.
- Brassey, Thomas A. (1903). "Chapter III: Relative Strength". The Naval Annual. Portsmouth: J. Griffin & Co.: 57–68. OCLC 496786828.
- Barry, E. B. (1896). "VII. Naval Manoeuvres of 1895". Notes on the Year's Naval Progress. General Information Series. Washington: Government Printing Office. pp. 163–214.
- Campbell, N. J. M. (1979). "France". In Chesneau, Roger & Kolesnik, Eugene M. (eds.). Conway's All the World's Fighting Ships 1860–1905. Greenwich, UK: Conway Maritime Press. pp. 282–333. ISBN 978-0-85177-133-5.
- Garbett, H., ed. (October 1902). "Naval Notes: France". Journal of the Royal United Service Institution. XLVI (296). London: J. J. Keliher & Co.: 1345–1349. OCLC 8007941.
- Garbett, H., ed. (November 1902). "The French Naval Manoeuvres of 1902". Journal of the Royal United Service Institution. XLVI (297). London: J. J. Keliher & Co.: 1436–1456. OCLC 8007941.
- Garbett, H., ed. (October 1903). "Naval Notes: France". Journal of the Royal United Service Institution. XLVII (308). London: J. J. Keliher & Co.: 1185–1190. OCLC 1077860366.
- Leyland, John (1901a). "Chapter III: The Progress of Foreign Navies". The Naval Annual. Portsmouth: Clowes: 33–70. OCLC 271433635.
- Leyland, John (1901b). "Chapter IV: Comparative Strength". The Naval Annual. Portsmouth: Clowes: 74–89. OCLC 271433635.
- "Naval Notes: France". Journal of the Royal United Service Institution. XLII (249). London: J. J. Keliher & Co.: 1392–1396 November 1898. OCLC 1077860366.
- Paloczi-Horvath, George (1996). From Monitor to Missile Boat: Coast Defence Ships and Coastal Defence Since 1860. Annapolis, Maryland: Naval Institute Press. ISBN 978-1-55750-270-4.
- Roberts, Stephen (2021). French Warships in the Age of Steam 1859–1914. Barnsley: Seaforth Publishing. ISBN 978-1-5267-4533-0.
- Roche, Camille (1898). "Les machines marines à triple expansion. Machines de l'Amiral-Tréhouart, du Jemmapes et du Valmy" [Marine triple expansion engines: Engines of the Amiral-Tréhouart, Jemmapes and Valmy]. Revue de Mécanique (in French): 162.
- Thursfield, J. R. (1897). Brassey, Thomas A. (ed.). "Naval Manoeuvres in 1896". The Naval Annual. Portsmouth: J. Griffin & Co.: 140–188. OCLC 496786828.
