= Dakhlet Nouadhibou =

Bay in Mauritania

- Baie du Lévrier (French); Bahía del Galgo (Spanish)
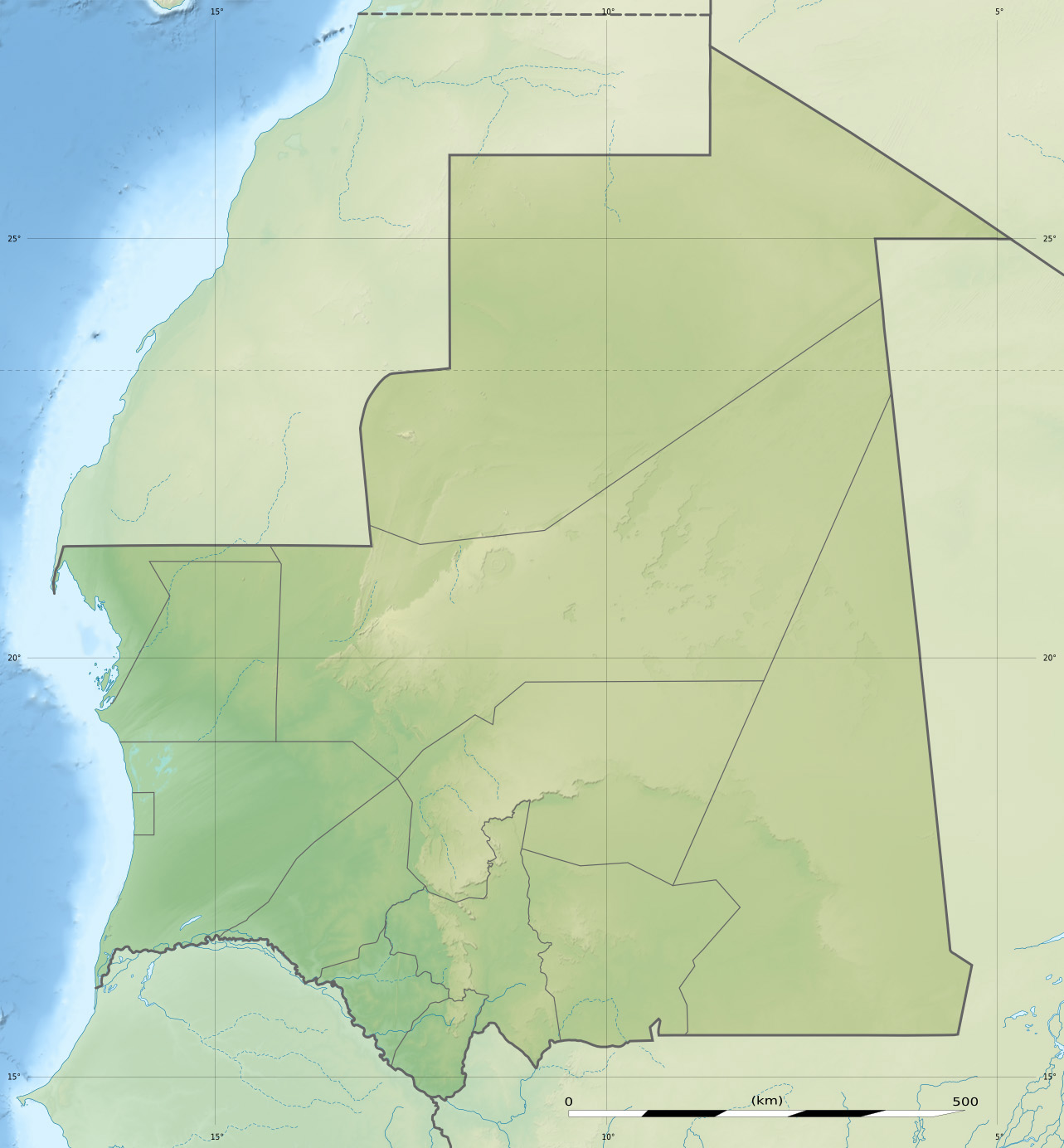
- Location of the bay in Mauritania
- Coordinates: 20.87°N 16.9°W
- Ocean/sea sources: Atlantic Ocean
- Basin countries: Mauritania
- Max. length: 54 km (34 mi)
- Max. width: 32 km (20 mi)

Dakhlet Nouadhibou is a bay on the Atlantic shore of Mauritania. The Dakhlet Nouadhibou Region, one of the primary administrative divisions of Mauritania, is named after it.

== Geography ==
It is one of the largest natural ports on the Atlantic coast of Africa and the only one in Mauritania. It is limited by the Cap Blanc (also known as Ras Nouadhibou ) headland on its western side. The bay opens towards the south and contains numerous shoals and extends from north to south for about 50 km, creating a bay about 43 km long and 32 km wide at the widest point. In French maps the inner bay is known as Baie de l'Archimède and the wider bay as Baie du Lévrier.

In addition to its geographical conditions, the bay of Nouadhibou has very favourable maritime conditions, given the absence of significant currents. The weather conditions also favour its use as a port as it is sheltered from winds and storms. The only unfavourable factor is the shallow sea depth in most of the bay, which has required frequent drainage of the navigation channels.

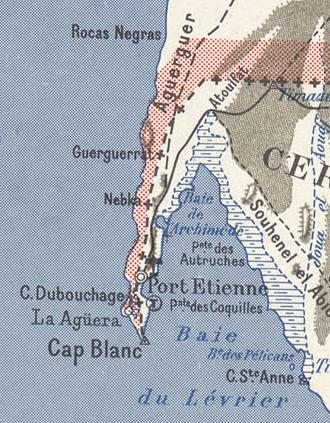
1958 French map of the Dakhlet Nouadhibou bay area

== Economic importance ==
The bay of Nouadhibou is the most important economic and commercial area of Mauritania. It is the base of the Mauritanian fishing industry, as well as the route by which the iron ore from the mines of Zouérat is exported from the country. The iron ore arrives at the ore terminal of Point Central (located 10 kilometers south of Nouadhibou) by a railway which runs 650 km from the mines to the port.

The Bay of Nouadhibou is the final resting place of over 300 ships and one of the world's largest ship graveyards.

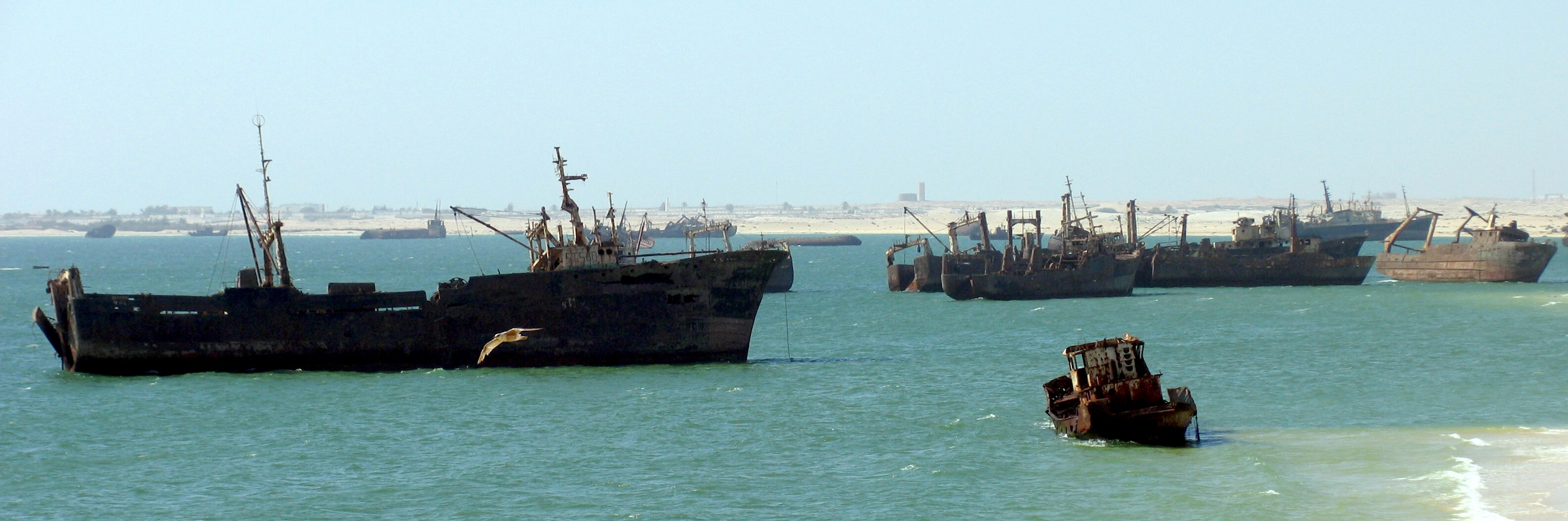
Ship graveyard at Nouadhibou

== See also ==
- French cruiser Chasseloup-Laubat
