= Jemmapes-class ironclad =

Coastal-defense ship class of the French Navy

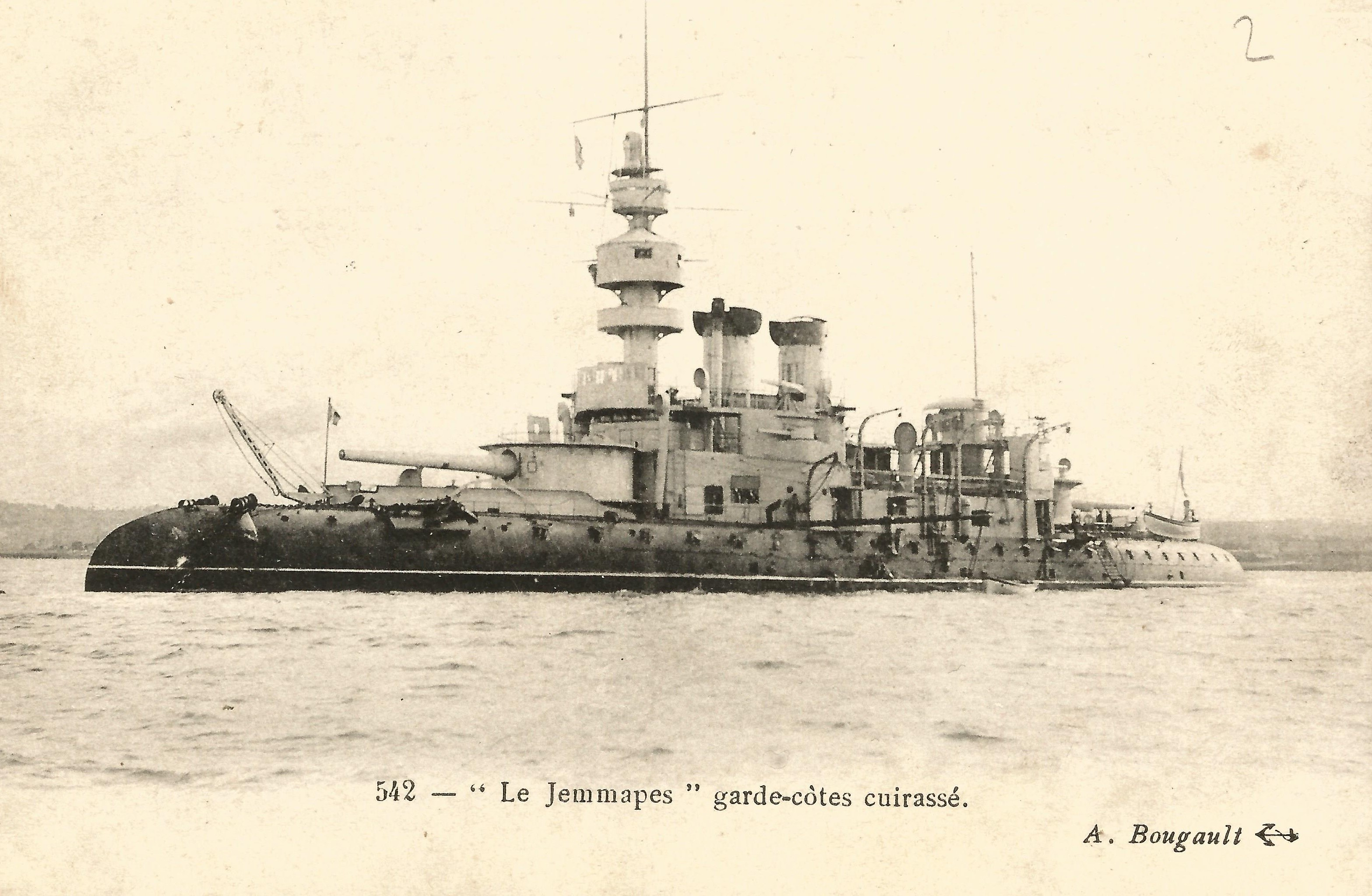
- Jemmapes

Class overview
- Name: Jemmapes class
- Operators: French Navy
- Preceded by: Furieux
- Succeeded by: Bouvines class
- Built: 1889–1894
- In service: 1895–1910
- Completed: 2
- Retired: 2

General characteristics
- Type: Coastal-defense ship
- Displacement: 6,579 t (6,475 long tons) (deep load)
- Length: 89.6 m (294 ft 0 in) (o/a)
- Beam: 17.48 m (57 ft 4 in)
- Draft: 6.71 m (22.0 ft)
- Installed power: 16 × Belleville boilers; 8,400 ihp (6,300 kW)
- Propulsion: 2 shafts, 2 triple-expansion steam engines
- Speed: 15 kn (28 km/h; 17 mph)
- Range: 2,667 nmi (4,939 km; 3,069 mi) at 11 kn (20 km/h; 13 mph)
- Complement: 299
- Armament: 2 × single 340 mm (13.4 in) guns; 4 × single 100 mm (3.9 in) QF guns; 6 × single 47 mm (1.9 in) QF guns; 8 × single 37 mm (1.5 in) Hotchkiss revolver cannon; 2 × 450 mm (18 in) torpedo tubes
- Armor: Belt: 310–460 mm (12.2–18.1 in); Deck: 60–100 mm (2–4 in); Conning tower: 80 mm (3.1 in); Turrets: 450 mm (17.7 in)

The Jemmapes class was a group of two coastal-defense ships built for the French Navy in the early 1890s. The class comprised Jemmapes and Valmy and were an improved version of the preceding Furieux, built for a higher speed with more modern Belleville boilers. They were armed with two turret-mounted 340 mm (13.4 in) guns and were protected by armor up to 460 mm (18 in) thick. Launched in 1892, the ships served with the Northern Squadron (Esadre du Nord) of the French Navy. They operated along with the similar Amiral Tréhouart and Bouvines as the Coastal Defence Division, being considered together "the most homogenous and dangerous squadron that one could meet at sea" by Vice Admiral Armand Bernard. They were struck in 1910 and, although Jemmapes had a brief respite as a hulk, they were both subsequently sold to be broken up.

== Design and development ==
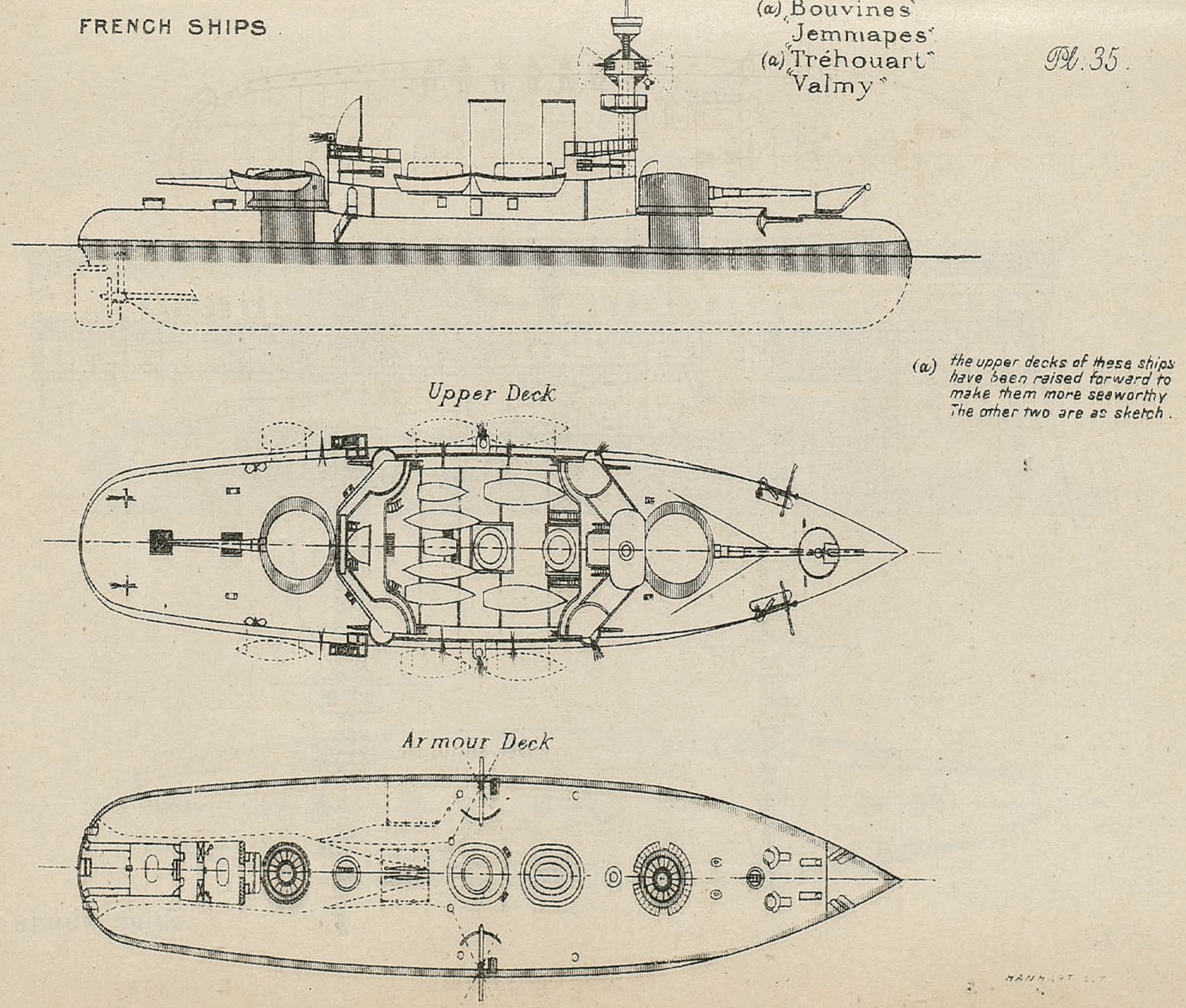
Plan view of the Jemmapes class

In the early 1880s, the Jeune École doctrine became popular in French naval circles. Key to this was the replacement of the battleship broadside with smaller vessels armed with torpedoes, such as smaller cruisers and torpedo boats, to defend France and attack enemy merchant shipping. To support these smaller vessels, a lesser number of powerful coastal defense ships were planned.

On 15 November 1888, the naval architect Louis de Bussy sent a note to the Ministry of the Navy (Ministère de la Marine) Jules François Émile Krantz on the newly-completed coastal defense ship Furieux. Krantz responded immediately with a request for a ship derived from Furieux but with more modern Belleville boilers to give a higher speed of 16 kn (30 km/h; 18 mph). De Bussy submitted his design on 14 February 1889. The design proposal was accepted by the Board of Construction (Conseil de travaux) on 26 February as meeting the criteria required, finalised on 2 July and approved on 6 July.

The ships of the Jemmapes class were longer than the Furieux with a overall length of 89.6 m (294 ft 0 in), 89.35 m (293 ft 2 in) at the waterline and 86.535 m (283 ft 10.9 in) between perpendiculars, but had a smaller beam of 17.48 m (57 ft 4 in) at the waterline and a smaller mean draught of 6.703 m (21 ft 11.9 in) at deep load. The vessels had a design displacement of 6,575 long tons (6,681 t), which increased to 6,579 long tons (6,685 t) in service. The complement numbered 299 sailors of all ranks.

The vessels were powered by two triple-expansion steam engines provided by St Denis that each drove one propeller shaft. Steam was provided by 16 coal-burning Lagrafel and d'Allest Belleville boilers. The power plant was rated at 8,400 indicated horsepower (6,300 kW) at 108 rpm and a pressure of 15 kg/cm^{2} (210 psi) at the boilers and 12 kg/cm^{2} (170 psi) at the engines. While undertaking sea trials, Jemmapes reached a speed of 15.68 knots (29.0 km/h; 18.0 mph) from 9,118 ihp (6,799 kW) and Valmy reached 15.92 knots (29.5 km/h; 18.3 mph) from 8,912 ihp (6,646 kW). In service, speed was restricted as a bow wave was created at 13 knots (24 km/h; 15 mph) which, by 15 knots (28 km/h; 17 mph) became impossible to push forward, meaning this became the de facto maximum speed. The ships carried 335 tonnes (330 long tons; 369 short tons) of coal, which gave a range of 2,667 nautical miles (4,939 km; 3,069 mi) at a cruising speed of 10.9 knots (20.2 km/h; 12.5 mph). The maximum load of coal was 350.84 tonnes (345.30 long tons; 386.73 short tons). Once in service, a range of 1,000 nautical miles (1,900 km; 1,200 mi) at 14 knots (25.9 km/h; 16.1 mph) was claimed.

=== Armament and armor ===
Jemmapes and Valmy were armed with a main battery of two Canon de 340 mm (13.4 in) Modèle 1887 guns in a two single-gun turrets, one forward of the superstructure and the other aft. The guns were manually-loaded and fired one round every five minutes, but this was sped up between 1900 and 1902 with new equipment. Secondary armament was provided by four 100 mm (3.9 in) 45-calibre M1891 QF guns mounted at the corners of the shelter deck. Defence from torpedo boats was provided by six Canon de 47 mm (1.9 in) Modèle 1885 Hotchkiss guns and eight 37-millimetre (1.5 in) Hotchkiss revolving cannons.

The ships had a full-length waterline armor belt that tapered from the maximum thickness of 460 mm (18 in) amidships to 410 mm (16 in) aft and 310 mm (12 in) forward. The belt was 1.9 m (75 in) high amidships. The armor was hammered steel on the port side and compound armor on the starboard. The turrets were protected by 450 mm (18 in) thick compound armor that was mounted on fixed bases 400 mm (16 in) thick while the gun shields for the secondary armament was provided by hammered steel armor 80 mm (3.1 in) thick. The main deck was protected by 50-millimeter (2 in) thick iron plates. The laminated steel plates protecting the conning tower measured 80 mm (3.1 in) in thickness. The armor was split between Schneider, who provided the steel, and Saint-Chamond, who provided the compound armor, except for the turret, which was completely supplied by the latter firm.

=== Modifications ===
During their lives, the ships had their armament modified. In 1906, the torpedo tubes were removed and by the following year six of the 37-mm Hotchkiss revolver cannons had been replaced by four additional 47-mm guns.

== Construction and career ==
Construction data
Name	Shipyard	Laid down	Launched	Commissioned	Cost
Jemmapes	Ateliers et Chantiers de la Loire, Saint-Nazaire and Saint-Denis	26 December 1889	27 April 1892	4 March 1895	£525,000
Valmy	Ateliers et Chantiers de la Loire, Saint-Nazaire and Saint Denis	1889	6 October 1892	14 August 1895	£578,957

Jemmapes and Valmy were commissioned into the Northern Squadron (Escadre du Nord) of the French Navy on 4 March and 14 August 1894 respectively, forming a small but formidable force within the French Navy. They were considered more than equal to their smaller German contemporaries, the Odin class and Siegfried class. On 12 March 1895, as part of the naval budget debate, Vice Admiral Armand Bernard declared that the two ships of the class, alongside the related ironclads Amiral Tréhouart and Bouvines, were "the most homogenous and dangerous squadron that one could meet at sea". The ships' service lives were largely uneventful. Between 1 and 23 July 1895 and 6 to 26 July 1896, they took part in large naval exercises in the Atlantic Ocean alongside local defense forces in Brest, Cherbourg, Lorient and Rochefort.

At the end of the century, the vessels were part of the Coastal Defence Division alongside Amiral-Tréhouart and Bouvines. Meanwhile, French naval doctrine was changing and the focus on coastal defense was being replaced by one of larger sea-going warships. The size of ships was also increasing, and newer, more capable battleships entered service. Jemmapes was transferred to reserve in 1902, Valmy following in 1903. Valmy was the first to be struck, on 1 July 1910, Jemmapes following on 3 August. Valmy was put up for sale on 20 July 1911 and broken up. Jemmapes spent some time as a hulk before she being broken up on 5 November 1927.
