= SS Sagamore (1892) =

Ship

Coordinates: 51°50′N 14°00′W

History

United Kingdom
- Name: Sagamore
- Namesake: Sagamore
- Owner: 1892: Sagamore SS Co Ltd; 1899: White Diamond SS Co Ltd
- Operator: George Warren & Co
- Port of registry: Liverpool
- Route: Liverpool – Boston
- Builder: Harland and Wolff, Belfast
- Yard number: 256
- Launched: 8 September 1892
- Completed: 30 November 1892
- Identification: UK official number 102059; code letters MVQR; call sign MPT
- Fate: Sunk by torpedo, 3 March 1917

General characteristics
- Type: Cargo liner
- Tonnage: 1892: 5,036 GRT, 3,280 NRT; 1914: 5,197 GRT, 3,305 NRT
- Length: 430.4 ft (131.2 m)
- Beam: 46.3 ft (14.1 m)
- Depth: 31.0 ft (9.4 m)
- Installed power: 593 NHP
- Propulsion: Triple expansion engine
- Speed: 13 knots (24 km/h; 15 mph)
- Capacity: 1913: 60 second class passengers
- Crew: 59
- Notes: sister ship: Sachem

SS Sagamore was a transatlantic cargo liner that was built in Ireland in 1892 for George Warren's White Diamond Steam Ship Company. In 1913 she was modified to carry passengers as well as cargo. In 1917 a German U-boat sank her, causing the death of 52 members of her crew.

== Building ==
Harland and Wolff built Sagamore in 1892, launching her on 8 September and completing her on 30 November. She was a steel-hulled cargo ship, 430.4 ft (131.2 m) long, with a beam of 46.3 ft (14.1 m) and depth of 31.0 ft (9.4 m). As built, her tonnages were 5,036 GRT and 3,280 NRT. Sagamore had a single screw, driven by a triple expansion engine that was rated at 593 NHP and gave her a speed of 13 knots (24 km/h; 15 mph). She had one funnel and four masts.

Sagamore's UK official number was 102059 and her code letters were MVQR.

In 1893 Harland and Wolff built a sister ship, Sachem, also for the White Diamond SS Co. Sachem was 15 ft (5 m) longer than Sagamore, but the two ships were otherwise similar in specification and appearance.

== Passenger accommodation ==
In 1912 George Warren sold a controlling interest in his White Diamond SS Co to Furness, Withy and Co. In 1913 the new owners had Sagamore and Sachem modified with the addition of accommodation for 60 second class passengers. In Sagamore's case this increased her tonnages to 5,197 GRT and 3,305 NRT.

By 1914 Sagamore carried a wireless telegraphy installation, operated by the Marconi Company. Her call sign was MPT.

== Service ==
On 17 June 1913 she ran down and sank the American fishing schooner "Olympia" off Sable Island, Nova Scotia, killing six of Olympia's crew.

== Loss ==
On 27 February 1917 Sagamore left Boston on her usual route to Liverpool. On 3 March she was in the Western Approaches when the German U-boat SM U-49 hit her with one torpedo amidships on her port side. She took half an hour to sink, giving her crew time to get clear in three lifeboats. But overnight a gale separated the three boats, and two of them were never seen again.

On 12 March the Blue Funnel Line steamship Deucalion, outbound from the UK to South Africa, found one of Sagamore's lifeboats. By then ten men had died in the boat, only seven survivors remained and several were suffering from frostbite. On 6 April Deucalion landed them at Cape Town, where they were hospitalised. In five cases the frostbite had led to gangrene and the men's feet had to be amputated.

== Wreck ==
Sagamore's wreck lies at a depth of more than 400 m (220 fathoms), about 150 nautical miles (280 km; 170 mi) northwest of Fastnet Rock. The nearest land is Dunmore Head in County Kerry.

It is in what are now the territorial waters of the Republic of Ireland. Ireland's National Monuments Service records it as wreck number W05890. Being more than a century old, the wreck is automatically protected by the National Monuments (Amendment) Act, 1987, section 3, sub-section (4).

== Bibliography ==
- Burrell, David (1992). Furness Withy, 1891–1991. Kendal: World Ship Society. ISBN 0905617703.
- The Marconi Press Agency Ltd (1914). The Year Book of Wireless Telegraphy and Telephony. London: The Marconi Press Agency Ltd.
