= List of fleets =

The following is a list of fleets of navies from around the world.

== Australian fleet ==
- Fleet Command (Australia)

== Canadian fleets ==
- Commander, Canadian Fleet Atlantic (Maritime Forces Atlantic) (HQ Halifax, Nova Scotia)
- Commander, Canadian Fleet Pacific (Maritime Forces Pacific) (HQ Esquimalt, British Columbia)

== Chinese fleets ==
=== Historic ===
- Chinese treasure fleet
- Beiyang Fleet
- Nanyang Fleet

=== Modern People's Liberation Army Navy fleets ===
- East Sea Fleet
- North Sea Fleet
- South Sea Fleet

== Colombian fleets ==
=== Oceanic Fleets ===
- Naval Force of the Caribbean (HQ, Cartagena)
- Naval Force of the Pacific (HQ, Bahía Málaga near Buenaventura)

=== Riverine Flotillas ===
- Naval Force of the Orinoco (HQ, Puerto Carreño), Colombian part of the Orinoco and its tributaries.
- Naval Force South (HQ, Puerto Leguízamo), Colombian part of the Amazon and its tributaries, mainly the Caquetá and Guainía

== German fleets ==
- High Seas Fleet – historic

== Indian fleets ==
=== Naval Commands ===
- Western Naval Command
- Eastern Naval Command
- Southern Naval Command

=== Fleets ===
- Western Fleet
- Eastern Fleet

== Indonesian fleets ==
- 1st Fleet Command (HQ Tanjungpinang)
- 2nd Fleet Command (HQ Surabaya)
- 3rd Fleet Command (HQ Sorong)

== Iranian fleets ==
- Northern Fleet (Iran)
- Southern Fleet (Iran)

== Japanese fleets ==
=== Pre–World War I ===
- Combined Fleet (聯合艦隊 Rengō Kantai?)
  - 1st Fleet (HQ Hashira-jima, Yamaguchi)
  - 2nd Fleet
  - 3rd Fleet (HQ Babeldaob, Palau)
  - 4th Fleet (HQ Truk, Micronesia)
- Eastern Fleet (東部艦隊 Tōbu-Kantai?)
- Guard Fleet (警備艦隊 Keibi Kantai?)
- Medium Fleet (中艦隊 Chū-Kantai?)
- Northern Expeditionary Fleet (北伐艦隊 Hokubatsu Kantai?)
- Small Fleet (小艦隊 Shō-Kantai?)
- Western Fleet (西部艦隊 Seibu-Kantai?)

=== World War I ===
- Combined Fleet (聯合艦隊 Rengō Kantai?)
  - 1st Fleet
  - 2nd Fleet
  - 3rd Fleet

=== World War II ===
- Combined Fleet, the main combatant component of the Imperial Japanese Navy during World War II.
  - 1st Fleet (HQ Hashira-jima, Yamaguchi)
  - 2nd Fleet
  - 3rd Fleet (HQ Babeldaob, Palau)
  - 4th Fleet (HQ Truk, Micronesia)
  - 5th Fleet
  - 6th Fleet (HQ Kwajalein, Marshall Islands)
  - Southern Expeditionary Fleet
- 10th Area Fleet
- Central Pacific Area Fleet
- China Area Fleet, tasked with guarding the Chinese coastal area, had the same organizational level as the Combined Fleet
- Northeast Area Fleet
- Southeast Area Fleet

=== Modern day ===
- Self Defense Fleet, the main combatant component of the Japan Maritime Self-Defense Force.

== North Korean fleets ==
- East Coast Fleet headquartered at Toejo
- West Coast Fleet headquartered at Nampo

== Russian or Soviet fleets ==
=== Active fleets ===
- Baltic Fleet
- Black Sea Fleet
- Caspian Flotilla
- Russian Northern Fleet
- Pacific Ocean Fleet (Russia)

=== Inactive fleets, Soviet and Russian ===
- Amur Military Flotilla
- Arctic Sea Flotilla
- Soviet Red Banner Northern Fleet

== South Korean fleets ==
- Republic of Korea First Fleet (Headquarters Donghae) – East Sea
- Republic of Korea Second Fleet (Headquarters Pyeongtaek) – Yellow Sea
- Republic of Korea Third Fleet (Headquarters Mokpo) – South Sea
- Submarine Force (HQ Jinhae, Jeju)
- Component Flotilla FIVE (Headquarters Jinhae)
- Mobile Flotilla SEVEN (Headquarters Jeju)
  - Mobile Squadron SEVEN ONE
  - Mobile Squadron SEVEN TWO
- Fleet Combat Training Group EIGHT (Headquarters Jinhae)

== Saudi Arabian fleets ==
- Eastern Fleet (Saudi Arabia)
- Western Fleet (Saudi Arabia)

== Spanish fleets ==
=== Spanish ===
- Spanish treasure fleet (HQ Seville)
- Manila galleon (HQ Manila)
- New Spain fleet (HQ Havana)
- Royal Galley Fleet (HQ Cartagena and Naples)

=== Modern Day ===
- La Flota (The Fleet), the main combatant component of the Spanish Navy (HQ Rota)
- Canary Islands squadron (HQ Las Palmas)
- Submarine flotilla (HQ Cartagena)

== Swedish fleets ==
- Coastal Fleet

== Turkish fleets ==
- Turkish Fleet Command
- Northern Sea Area Command, İstanbul
  - Istanbul Strait Command, Anadolukavağı, İstanbul
  - Çanakkale Strait Command, Nara, Çanakkale
  - Black Sea Area Command, Karadeniz Ereğli, Zonguldak
  - Underwater Search and Rescue Group Command, Beykoz, İstanbul
  - Rescue Group Command
  - Underwater Defence Group Command
  - Naval Hydrography and Oceanography Division Command, Çubuklu, İstanbul
  - Bartın Naval Base Command, Bartın
  - Naval Museum Command, Beşiktaş, İstanbul
  - Istanbul Naval Shipyard Command, Pendik
- Southern Sea Area Command, İzmir
  - Amphibious Task Group Command, Foça, İzmir
  - Amphibious Marine Brigade Command, Foça, İzmir
  - Amphibious Ships Command, Foça, İzmir
  - Aksaz Naval Base Command, Aksaz Naval Base, Marmaris
  - Mediterranean Area Command, Mersin
  - İskenderun Naval Base Command, İskenderun, Hatay
  - Aegean Sea Area Command, İzmir
  - Foça Naval Base Command, Foça, İzmir
  - Maintenance, Repair and Engineering Command, İzmir

== United Kingdom fleets ==
=== Pre World War I ===
- Atlantic Fleet – Atlantic Ocean, English Channel
- Baltic Fleet, Baltic Sea
- Channel Fleet – English Channel
- Downs Station – Southern, North Sea
- Irish Fleet Irish Sea
- North Sea Fleet – North Sea
- Reserve Fleet

=== World War I ===
- Battle Cruiser Fleet – North Sea
- First Fleet
- Grand Fleet (HQ Scapa Flow, Orkney, Scotland) – North Sea
- Mediterranean Fleet (HQ Malta) – Mediterranean Sea
- Second Fleet
- Third Fleet
- Reserve Fleet

=== World War II ===
- Home Fleet (HQ Scapa Flow, Orkney, Scotland) – North Sea
- Mediterranean Fleet (HQ Alexandria, Egypt) – Mediterranean Sea
- Eastern Fleet (HQ Trincomalee, Ceylon) – Indian Ocean
- British Pacific Fleet (HQ Sydney, Australia) – South West Pacific
- East Indies Fleet, (HQ Trincomalee, Ceylon) – Indian Ocean
- Reserve Fleet

=== Post World War II ===
- East Indies Fleet (HQ Trincomalee, Ceylon) – Indian Ocean
- Far East Fleet (HQ Singapore) (to 1971)
- Reserve Fleet
- Western Fleet (HQ Northwood, England) (1967–71)
- Commander-in-Chief Fleet (1971–2002)

After 2002 a four-star commander-in-chief ceased to be appointed and the responsibilities of the post were transferred to the three-star Fleet Commander.

== United States fleets ==
=== Type commands ===
- United States Fleet Forces Command (formerly Atlantic Fleet) - also Commander United States Second Fleet
- United States Naval Forces Central Command - also Commander United States Fifth Fleet
- United States Naval Forces Europe - Naval Forces Africa
- United States Naval Forces Southern Command - also Commander United States Fourth Fleet
- United States Pacific Fleet

=== Modern US Navy fleets ===
US Navy fleets are numbered odd in the Pacific or West, and even in the Atlantic or East:

- United States Second Fleet (HQ Norfolk, Virginia) – North Atlantic Ocean, Arctic Ocean, & Homeland Defense.
- United States Third Fleet (HQ San Diego, California) – East Pacific
- United States Fourth Fleet (HQ Mayport, Florida) – South Atlantic
- United States Fifth Fleet (HQ Manama, Bahrain) – Middle East
- United States Sixth Fleet (HQ Naples, Italy) – Europe, including Mediterranean Sea & Black Sea.
- United States Seventh Fleet (HQ Yokosuka, Japan) – West Pacific
- United States Tenth Fleet (HQ Fort Meade, Maryland) – Reactivated as Fleet Cyber Command. Formerly anti submarine warfare coordinating organization.

=== Inactive and historic ===
- United States First Fleet
- United States Eighth Fleet
- United States Ninth Fleet
- United States Eleventh Fleet
- United States Twelfth Fleet
- United States Asiatic Fleet – historic
- United States Navy Reserve Fleets
- Great White Fleet – nickname for the United States Atlantic Fleet sent around the world by President Theodore Roosevelt in 1908
- Great Green Fleet – nickname for the United States ships or current carrier strike group sent around the world to promote a new bio-energy sustainable fuel
- East India Squadron
- European Squadron
- North Atlantic Fleet
- Mediterranean Squadron
- Scouting Fleet
- South Atlantic Squadron

== Informal fleet names ==
- Spanish Armada – name used in England to describe the fleet assembled by Philip II of Spain for the invasion of England
