= French ironclad Valmy =

Coastal defense battleship of the French Navy

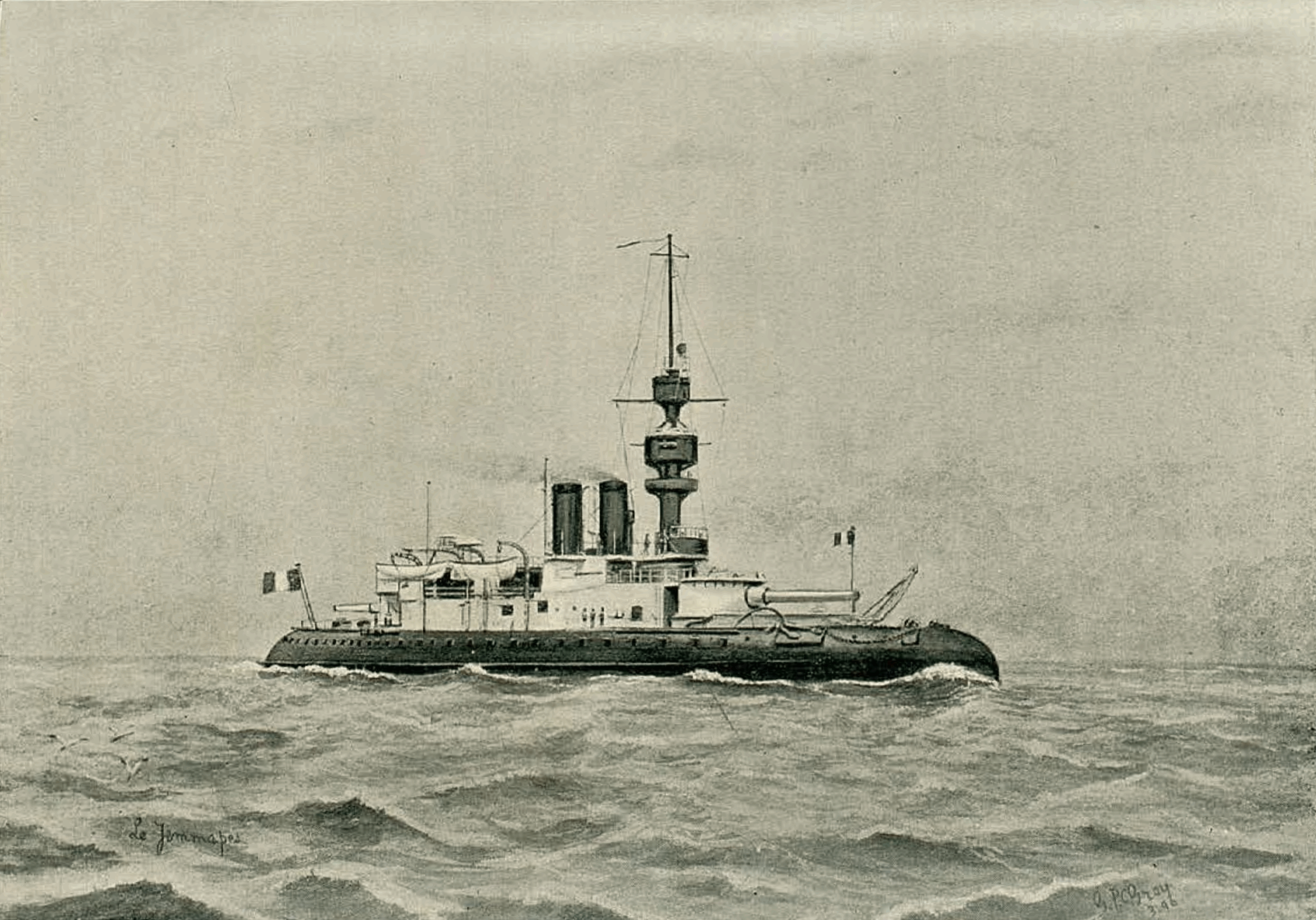
- Sister ship Jemmapes in 1896

History

France
- Name: Valmy
- Ordered: 18 December 1889
- Builder: Ateliers et Chantiers de la Loire, Saint-Nazaire and Saint-Denis
- Laid down: 1889
- Launched: 6 October 1892
- Commissioned: 14 August 1895
- Decommissioned: 11 October 1909
- Stricken: 1 July 1910
- Fate: Sold to be broken up 20 July 1911

General characteristics
- Class & type: Jemmapes-class coastal defense ship
- Displacement: 6,579 t (6,475 long tons) (deep load)
- Length: 89.6 m (294 ft 0 in) (o/a)
- Beam: 17.48 m (57 ft 4 in)
- Draft: 6.71 m (22.0 ft)
- Installed power: 16 × Belleville boilers; 8,400 ihp (6,300 kW)
- Propulsion: 2 shafts, 2 triple-expansion steam engines
- Speed: 15 kn (28 km/h; 17 mph)
- Range: 2,667 nmi (4,939 km; 3,069 mi) at 11 kn (20 km/h; 13 mph)
- Complement: 299
- Armament: 2 × single 340 mm (13 in) guns; 4 × single 100 mm (3.9 in) QF guns; 6 × single 47 mm (1.9 in) QF guns; 8 × single 37 mm (1.5 in) Hotchkiss revolver cannon; 2 × 450 mm (18 in) torpedo tubes
- Armor: Belt: 310–460 mm (12.2–18.1 in); Deck: 60–100 mm (2–4 in); Conning tower: 80 mm (3.1 in); Turrets: 450 mm (17.7 in)

Valmy was the second member of the Jemmapes class of coastal defense ships built for the French Navy (Marine Nationale) in the 1890s. Launched in 1892, the vessel joined the (Esadre du Nord Northern Squadron of the French Navy) at Brest. Armed with a main armament of two 274 mm (10.8 in) guns, the vessel was designed within the principles of the Jeune École. The ship served in the Northern Squadron, which Vice Admiral Armand Bernard called, "the most homogenous and dangerous squadron that one could meet at sea". Valmy took part in a large naval exercises in 1895 and 1896 but otherwise had an uneventful career as French naval doctrine moved from a fleet of smaller coastal defense ships to larger ocean-going battleships. The ship was decommissioned after 1909 and sold in 1911 to be broken up.

== Design and description ==
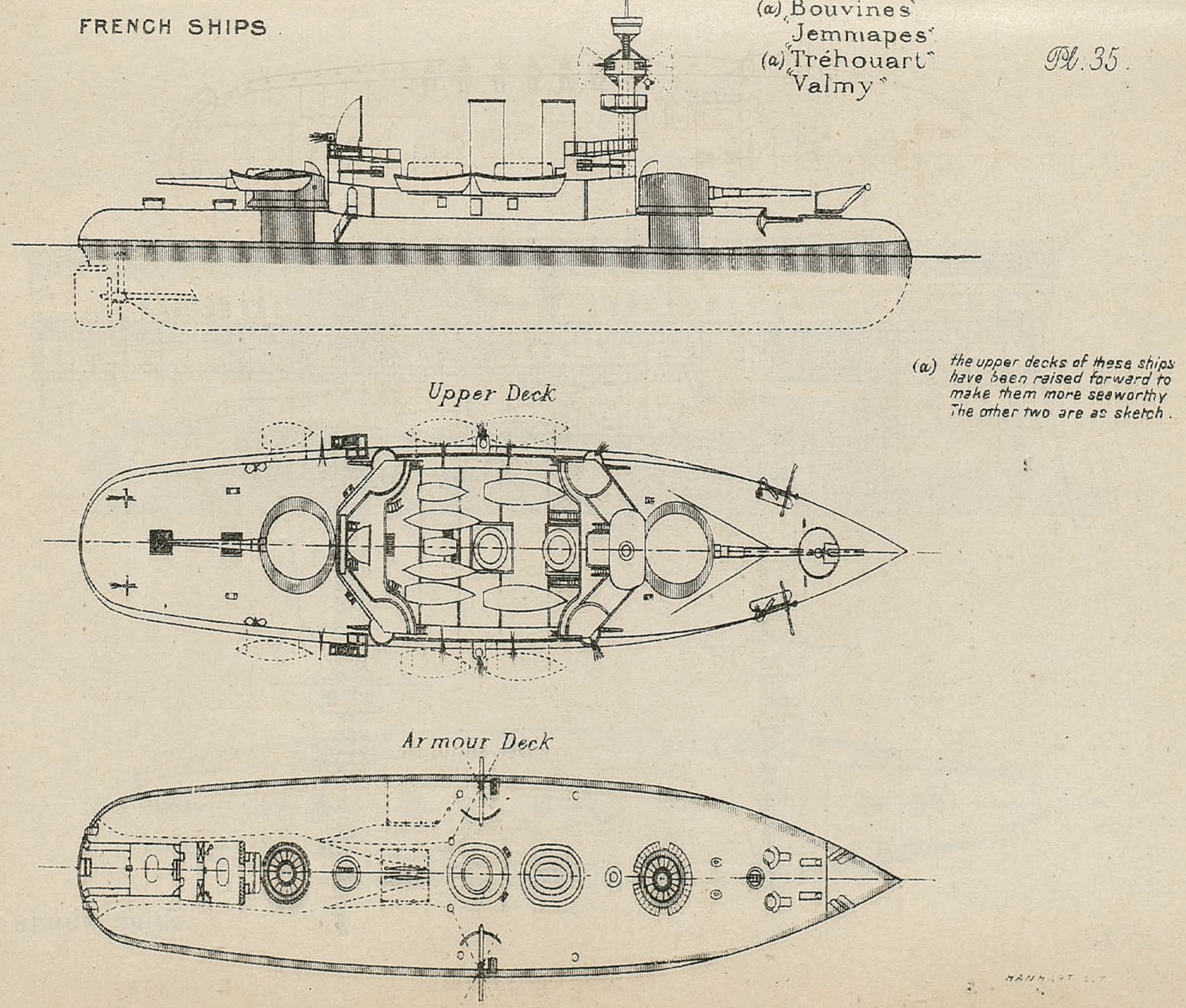
Plan view of the Jemmapes class

Launched in 1883, Valmy was the second member of the Jemmapes class of coastal defense ships designed by de Bussy for the French Navy (Marine Nationale) as part of a wider adoption of the principles of Jeune École. The design was to have a similar level of armament, armour, draught and fuel storage as the preceding French ironclad Furieux but with a more modern powerplant based on Belleville boilers that would provide an increase in speed to 16 kn (30 km/h; 18 mph). The design proposal was accepted by the Board of Construction (Conseil de travaux) on 26 February 1889, finalised on 2 July and approved by the Minister of the Navy (Ministère de la Marine) Jules François Émile Krantz on 6 July.

Valmy had an overall length of 89.6 m (294 ft 0 in), 89.35 m (293 ft 2 in) at the waterline and86.535 m (283 ft 10.9 in) between perpendiculars, a beam of 17.48 m (57 ft 4 in) at the waterline and a mean draught of 6.703 m (21 ft 11.9 in) at deep load. The vessel displaced 6,579 metric tons (6,475 long tons) and had a ship's complement that numbered 299 sailors of all ranks.

Valmy was powered by two triple-expansion steam engines that each drove one propeller shaft using steam provided by 16 Lagrafel and d'Allest Bellville boilers. The engine was rated at 8,400 indicated horsepower (6,300 kW) at 108 rpm. While undertaking sea trials, Valmy reached a speed of 15.92 knots (29.5 km/h; 18.3 mph) from 8,911 ihp (6,645 kW). In service, speed was restricted as a bow wave was created at 13 knots (24 km/h; 15 mph) which, by 15 knots (28 km/h; 17 mph) became impossible to push forward, meaning this became the de facto maximum speed. The ship carried 335 tonnes (330 long tons; 369 short tons) of coal, which gave a range of 2,667 nautical miles (4,939 km; 3,069 mi) at a cruising speed of 10.9 knots (20.2 km/h; 12.5 mph). The maximum load of coal was 350.84 tonnes (345.30 long tons; 386.73 short tons). Once in service, a range of 1,000 nautical miles (1,900 km; 1,200 mi) at 14 knots (25.9 km/h; 16.1 mph) was claimed.

Valmy carried a main battery of two Canon de 274 mm (10.8 in) Modèle 1887 guns in a two single-gun turrets, one forward of the superstructure and the other aft. The guns were manually-loaded and fired one round every five minutes, but this was improved between 1900 and 1902 with new equipment. Secondary armament was provided by four 100 mm (3.9 in) 45-calibre M1891 QF guns mounted at the corners of the shelter deck. Defence from torpedo boats was provided by six Canon de 47 mm (1.9 in) Modèle 1885 Hotchkiss guns and eight 37-millimetre (1.5 in) Hotchkiss revolving cannon.

The ship had a full-length waterline armor belt that tapered from the maximum thickness of 460 mm (18 in) amidships to 410 mm (16 in) aft and 310 mm (12 in) forward. The belt was 1.9 m (75 in) high amidships. The armor was hammered steel on the port side and compound armor on the starboard. The turrets were protected by 450 mm (18 in) thick compound armor that was mounted on fixed bases 400 mm (16 in) thick while the gun shields for the secondary armament was provided by hammered steel armor 80 mm (3.1 in) thick. The main deck was protected by 50-millimeter (2 in) thick iron plates. The laminated steel plates protecting the conning tower measured 80 mm (3.1 in) in thickness.

== Construction and career ==
Ordered on 18 December 1889 from Ateliers et Chantiers de la Loire of Saint-Nazaire and Saint-Denis, Valmy was laid down later that year and launched on 6 October 1892. The vessel cost £578,957. The ship's machinery was fully installed on 15 March 1894 and accepted after trials on. Initially commissioned for trials in December 1894, Valmy had to wait until her machinery was accepted on 13 August the following year before being fully commissioned on 14 August. She joined the Northern Squadron (Esadre du Nord) of the French Navy to replace the ironclad Requin. On 12 March 1895, as part of the naval budget debate, Vice Admiral Armand Bernard declared that Valmy and her three companions formed "the most homogenous and dangerous squadron that one could meet at sea". They were considered more than equal to their smaller German contemporaries, the Odin class and Siegfried class.

Valmy had a generally uneventful career. Between 1 and 23 July 1895, the vessel took part in a large naval exercise in the Atlantic Ocean as part of the Northern Squadron. The manoeuvres included a forced landing at Quiberon and a mock blockade and attack on Cherbourg and Rochefort. The vessel served as part of the defending force, which was successful in resisting the attack. The ship also took part in the maneuvers the following year, conducted from 6 to 26 July in conjunction with the local defense forces of Brest, Rochefort, Cherbourg, and Lorient. The squadron was divided into three divisions for the maneuvers, and Valmy was assigned to the 2nd Division along with her sister ship Jemmapes, the cruiser Chasseloup-Laubat and the aviso Salve, which represented part of the defending French squadron. At the end of the century, the vessel was part of the Coastal Defence Division alongside the ironclads Amiral Tréhouart, Bouvines and Jemmapes.

Meanwhile, French naval doctrine was changing and the focus on coastal defense was being replaced by one of larger sea-going warships. The size of ships was also increasing, and newer, more capable battleships entered service. Valmy was transferred to reserve in 1903, being transferred to Brest between 1 and 2 September 1909. The vessel was ordered to be decommissioned on 11 October 1909 and struck on 1 July the following year. Valmy was sold on 20 July 1911 and broken up.

== Bibliography ==
- Barry, E. B. (1896). "VII. Naval Manoeuvres of 1895". Notes on the Year's Naval Progress. General Information Series. Washington: Government Printing Office. pp. 163–214.
- Brassey, Thomas, ed. (1897). "Part II: British and Foreign Armoured and Unarmoured Ships". The Naval Annual 1897. Portsmouth: J. Griffin & Co.: 227–335. OCLC 1342523853.
- Brassey, Thomas A. (1899). "Chapter III: Relative Strength". The Naval Annual. Portsmouth: J. Griffin & Co.: 70–80. OCLC 496786828.
- Campbell, N. J. M. (1979). "France". In Chesneau, Roger & Kolesnik, Eugene M. (eds.). Conway's All the World's Fighting Ships 1860–1905. Greenwich, UK: Conway Maritime Press. pp. 282–333. ISBN 978-0-85177-133-5.
- Paloczi-Horvath, George (1996). From Monitor to Missile Boat: Coast Defence Ships and Coastal Defence Since 1860. Annapolis, Maryland: Naval Institute Press. ISBN 978-1-55750-270-4.
- Roberts, Stephen (2021). French Warships in the Age of Steam 1859–1914. Barnsley: Seaforth Publishing. ISBN 978-1-5267-4533-0.
- Roche, Camille (1898). "Les machines marines à triple expansion. Machines de l'Amiral-Tréhouart, du Jemmapes et du Valmy" [Marine triple expansion engines: Engines of the Amiral-Tréhouart, Jemmapes and Valmy]. Revue de Mécanique (in French): 162.
- Thursfield, J. R. (1897). Brassey, Thomas A. (ed.). "Naval Manoeuvres in 1896". The Naval Annual. Portsmouth: J. Griffin & Co.: 140–188. OCLC 496786828.
