= USS Iroquois (AT-46) =

Tugboat of the United States Navy

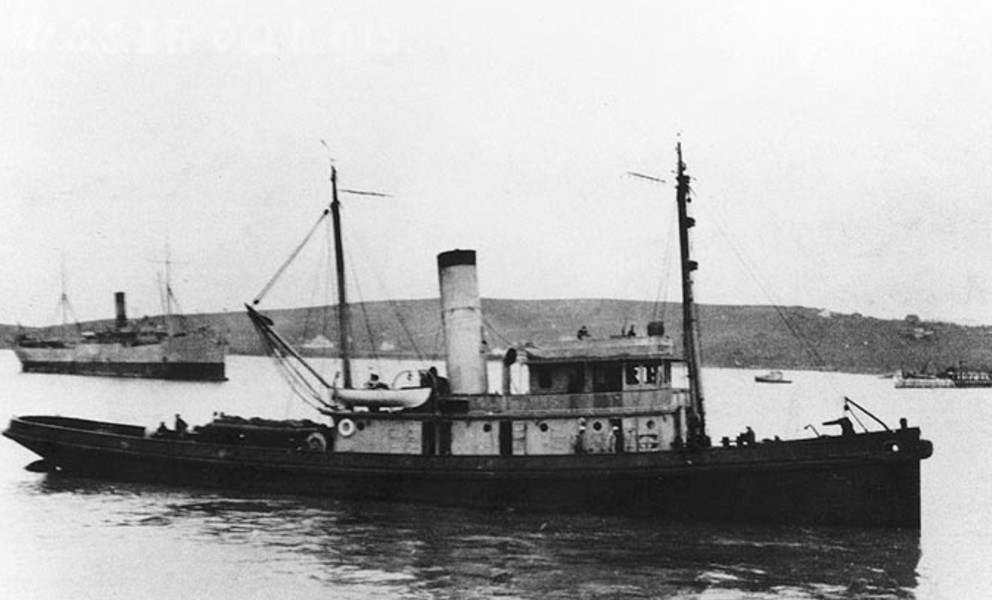
- USS Iroquois (1898-1928, later AT-46) off the Mare Island Navy Yard, California, prior to World War I.

History

United States
- Name: USS Iroquois
- Namesake: A powerful and warlike Indian confederacy formerly inhabiting central New York.
- Owner: J. D. Spreckles Brothers & Company
- Builder: Union Iron Works, San Francisco, California
- Laid down: date unknown
- Launched: 7 November 1891
- Christened: as the commercial tug Fearless
- Completed: 1892
- Acquired: by the Navy 18 April 1898
- Commissioned: 6 July 1898 as USS Iroquois
- Decommissioned: 7 March 1925, at San Diego, California
- Reclassified: AT-46, 17 July 1920
- Stricken: Unknown
- Home port: Mare Island Navy Yard, Honolulu, Hawaii, New York Harbor, San Diego, California
- Fate: Sold 15 May 1928; scrapped 1952

General characteristics
- Type: Tugboat
- Displacement: 702 long tons (713 t)
- Length: 152 ft (46 m)
- Beam: 26 ft (7.9 m)
- Draft: 13 ft 6 in (4.11 m)
- Propulsion: steam engine; 1 × shaft
- Speed: 13 kn (15 mph; 24 km/h)
- Complement: 39 officers and enlisted
- Armament: 1 × 4 in (100 mm) gun, 1 × Gatling gun

USS Iroquois (AT-46) was a tugboat acquired by the United States Navy in anticipation of need for the Spanish–American War. She performed a variety of duties at a number of locations, both in the Pacific Ocean as well as the Atlantic Ocean. In 1925, she was finally decommissioned, and sold by the Navy a few years later.

== Built in San Francisco ==
The second ship to be so named by the Navy, Iroquois—a steam tug—was built as Fearless by Union Iron Works, San Francisco, California in 1892; purchased by the Navy from J. D. Spreckles Bros. & Co. on 18 April 1898 during preparations for the expected war with Spain; and commissioned as Iroquois on 6 July 1898.

== Service in the Pacific Ocean ==
Iroquois served as a station tug at Mare Island Navy Yard in California until 19 January 1899, when she sailed for duty in the Hawaiian Islands. Upon arriving Honolulu on 28 January, she acted as a station tug, mail boat, and even surveying ship between the main islands and Midway Islands.

She returned to Mare Island on 15 February 1910, and for the next 10 years operated between that base and San Diego, California, as a collier and supply ship. Iroquois also performed patrol and salvage duties during this period.

== World War I service ==
After America's entry into World War I, the tug steamed to New York City early in 1918, and for the next few months served as a tug and convoy escort along the U.S. East Coast.

Following this service, she departed New York on 30 June 1919 for Charleston, South Carolina, then left for San Diego, California, arriving on 27 October. She served 13th Naval District as a harbor craft out of San Diego until 1925.

== Decommissioning ==
Iroquois was decommissioned on 7 March 1925. She was sold to Benjamin L. Jones of Bellington, Washington on 15 May 1928.
