= Canon de 340 mm Modèle 1887 gun =

Canon de 340 mm Modèle 1887
- Type: Naval gun
- Place of origin: France

Service history
- Used by: France
- Wars: First World War

Specifications
- Mass: 61.66 t (60.69 long tons; 67.97 short tons)
- Barrel length: 14.133 metres (46 ft 4 in) (42 caliber)
- Shell: Separate-loading, bagged charge
- Shell weight: 490 kg (1,080 lb) (APC shell)
- Caliber: 340 mm (13.4 in)
- Elevation: −4° to +10°
- Rate of fire: 1 round per four minutes
- Muzzle velocity: 740 m/s (2,400 ft/s)
- Maximum firing range: 10,900 m (11,900 yd)

The Canon de 340 mm Modèle 1887 was a heavy naval gun used as the main armament of several ships of the Marine Nationale (French Navy) before World War I. It equipped the French battleship Brennus and the coast-defense ships Jemmapes and Valmy.

== Ammunition ==
- APC (Armor-piercing, Capped) - 490 kg (1,080 lb)
- SAPC (Semi-Armor-piercing, Capped) - 490 kg (1,080 lb)
- CI (Cast iron) - 420 kg (930 lb)
