= USS Long Beach (AK-9) =

Cargo ship that served under British, Greek, German & US ownership

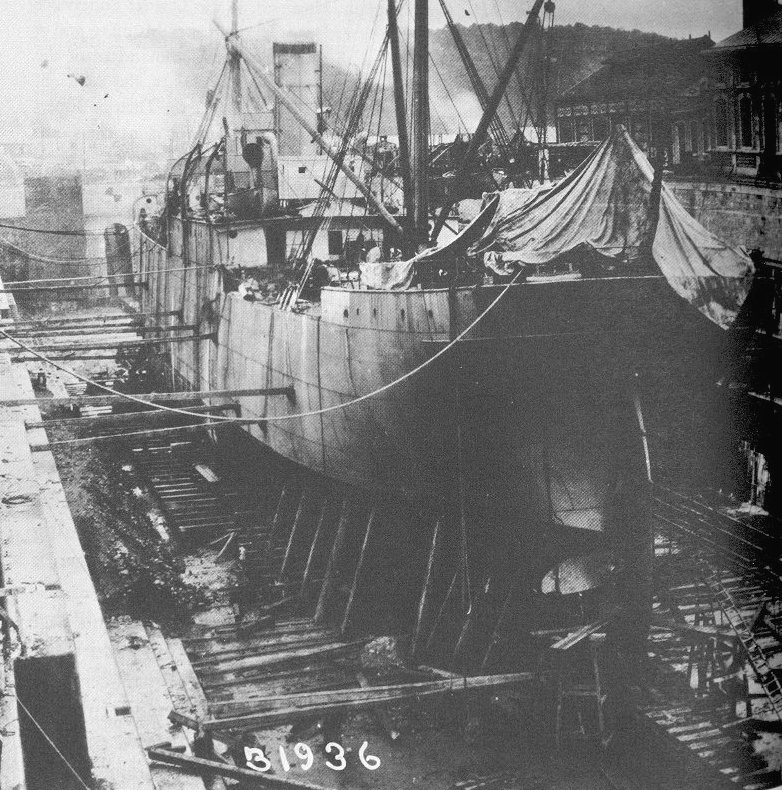
- USS Long Beach in dry dock in Brest, France in 1918

History
- Name: 1892: Yarrowdale; 1902: Nicolaos Castriotis; 1905: Hohenfelde; 1917: Long Beach; 1923: Golden Gate
- Owner: 1892: Mackill Steamship Co; 1902: CN Castriotti; 1905: D Furhmann, Nissle & Günther Nachflg; 1917: US Shipping Board; 1922: Long Beach SS Corp; 1924: Golden Gate Nav Inc
- Operator: 1892: R Mackill & Co; 1917: United States Navy
- Port of registry: 1892: (United Kingdom) Glasgow; 1902: (Greece) Piraeus; 1905: (German Empire) Hamburg; 1924: (United States) Wilmington
- Builder: Wm Pickersgill & Sons, Southwick
- Yard number: 101
- Launched: 5 October 1892
- Completed: November 1892
- Acquired: seized by USSB, 6 April 1917
- Commissioned: into US Navy, 20 December 1917
- Decommissioned: from US Navy, 26 April 1921
- Identification: UK official number 99857; 1892: code letters MVBN; 1905: code letters RNMF; 1917: Hull symbol ID-2136; Hull symbol AK-9; 1922: US official number 22376; code letters MDRQ
- Fate: scrapped, October 1924

General characteristics
- Type: cargo ship
- Tonnage: 2,980 GRT, 1,908 NRT
- Displacement: 5,800 tons
- Length: 320.1 ft (97.6 m)
- Beam: 41.4 ft (12.6 m)
- Draught: 22 ft 0 in (6.7 m)
- Depth: 21.2 ft (6.5 m)
- Decks: 1
- Installed power: 265 NHP
- Propulsion: triple expansion engine
- Speed: 8 1/2 knots (15.7 km/h)
- Complement: (in US Navy): 104
- Armament: (in US Navy): 1 × 3-inch/50-caliber gun; 2 × machine guns

USS Long Beach (AK-9) was a cargo steamship that was built in England in 1892 as Yarrowdale, passed through a succession of British, Greek and German owners, and was seized by the United States in 1917. She served in the US Navy until 1921, then in the US Merchant Marine, and was scrapped in 1924. She was called Nicolaos Castriotis in Greek ownership, Hohenfelde in German ownership, and Golden Gate from 1923.

== Yarrowdale ==
William Pickersgill & Sons built the ship at Southwick, Sunderland, County Durham, as yard number 101. She was launched on 5 October 1892 and completed that November.

Her registered length was 320.1 ft (97.6 m), her beam was 41.4 ft (12.6 m) and her depth was 21.2 ft (6.5 m). Her tonnages were 2,980 GRT, 1,908 NRT, and 5,800 tons displacement. George Clark Ltd built her three-cylinder triple expansion engine. It was rated at 265 NHP and gave her a speed of 8 1/2 knots (15.7 km/h).

The Mackill Steamship Company owned Yarrowdale, and Robert Mackill & Company managed her. She was registered in Glasgow. Her UK official number was 99857 and her code letters were MVBN.

== Nicolaos Castriotis and Hohenfelde ==
In 1902 CN Castriotti acquired Yarrowdale, renamed her Nicolaos Castriotis and registered her in Piraeus.

In 1905 D Fuhrmann, Nissle und Günther Nachfolger acquired Nicolaos Castriotis, renamed her Hohenfelde, and registered her in Hamburg. Her code letters were RNMF. By August 1914 she had taken refuge from the First World War in Savannah, Georgia.

== Long Beach ==
On 6 April 1917 the United States declared war on the Central Powers. The United States Shipping Board seized the Central Powers' merchant ships in US ports. The USSB seized Hohenfelde in Savannah and transferred her to the US Navy the same day.

On 20 December 1917 the ship was commissioned at Charleston Navy Yard as USS Long Beach (ID-2136). On 26 December she left Jacksonville carrying a cargo of lumber to Philadelphia, where she arrived on 9 January 1918. On 4 February she left Norfolk, Virginia for Dublin, Ireland, where she arrived on 3 March. There she joined the United States Army Cross Channel Service, carrying coal from the United Kingdom to France. During 1918 Lt Cdr Einar Clark, USNRF, succeeded Lt Cdr Nelson as her commander.

On 23 April 1919 Long Beach left Dublin carrying a cargo of aviation materiél to Norfolk, VA, where she arrived on 13 May. Long Beach was overhauled at Philadelphia, and then joined the Naval Overseas Transportation Service. She took coal to Portsmouth, NH, Boston and Key West, and in 1920 made two voyages to the West Indies to deliver supplies to US Marine Corps detachments. On 17 July 1920 she was redesignated AK-9. On 19 December 1920 she left Norfolk, VA carrying coal to Melville, RI. She then entered Boston Navy Yard, where she was decommissioned on 26 April 1921.

By 1921 Long Beach was equipped for wireless telegraphy. On 4 May 1922 Mr BL Stafford of New York bought her for $20,000. Her owner was recorded as the Long Beach Steam Ship Corporation, which may have been a one-ship company created especially to own her.

== Golden Gate ==
In July 1923 Callaghan Atkinson & Co of New York bought the ship and renamed her Golden Gate. In 1924 she was registered in Wilmington, Delaware and her registered owner was the Golden Gate Navigation Company, Inc, which may have been another one-ship company. Her US official number was 22376 and her code letters were MDRQ. She was scrapped in Genoa, Italy in October 1924.

== Bibliography ==
- Dictionary of American Naval Fighting Ships. Vol. 4. Washington, DC: Naval Historical Center. 1969. Archived from the original on 28 May 2015 – via Hazegray.
- Lloyd's Register of British and Foreign Shipping. Vol. I–Steamers. London: Lloyd's Register of Shipping. 1902 – via Internet Archive.
- Lloyd's Register of British and Foreign Shipping. Vol. I–Steamers. London: Lloyd's Register of Shipping. 1906 – via Internet Archive.
- Lloyd's Register of Shipping. Vol. I–Steamers. London: Lloyd's Register of Shipping. 1921 – via Internet Archive.
- "Supplement". Lloyd's Register of Shipping. Vol. I–Steamers. London: Lloyd's Register of Shipping. 1924 – via Internet Archive.
- Mercantile Navy List. London. 1893 – via Crew List Index Project.
