= Ministry of the Navy (France) =

French Ministry of the Navy

- Ministère de la Marine
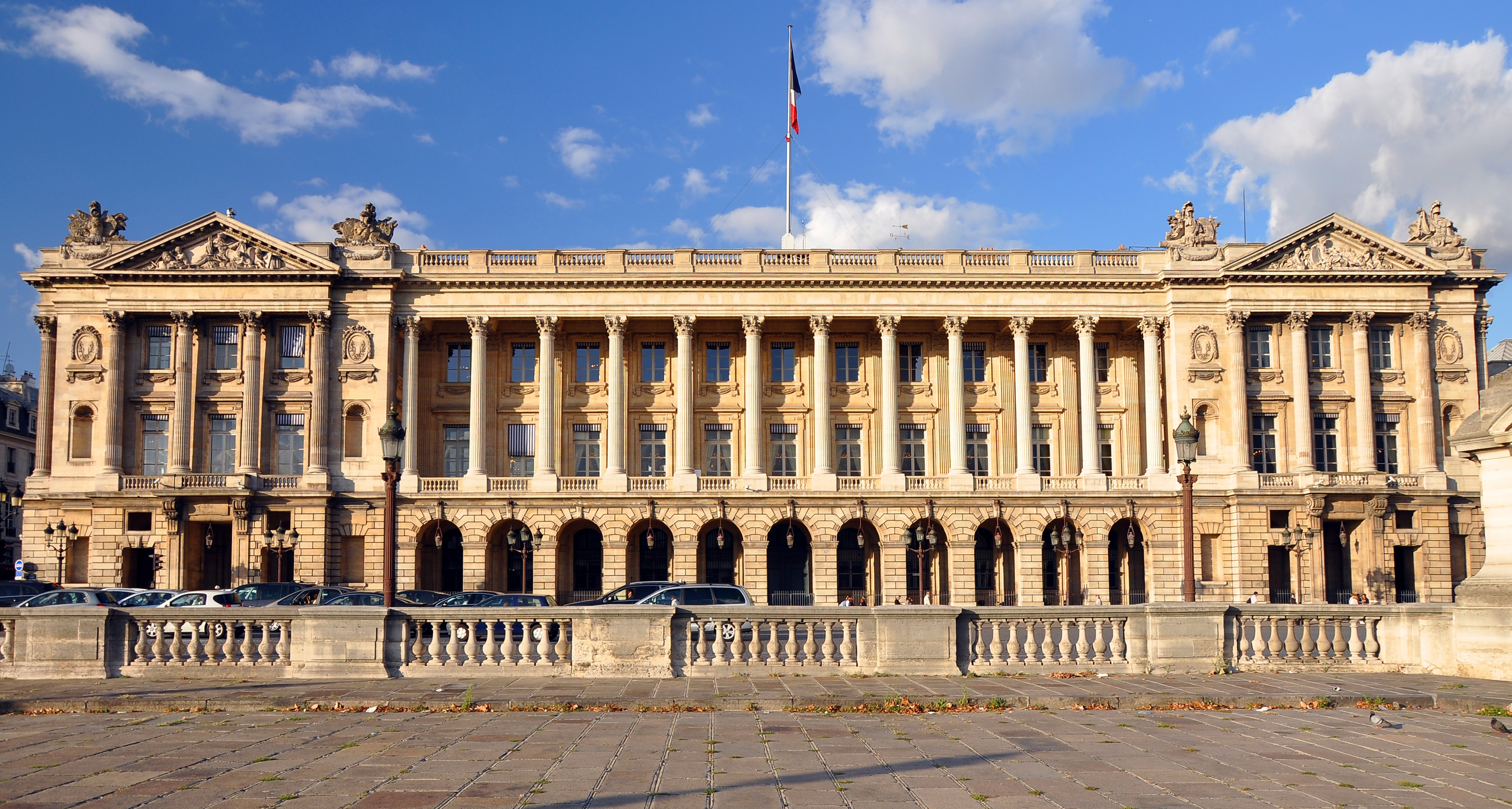
- Hôtel de la Marine, which housed the Ministry

Ministry overview
- Formed: 7 March 1669
- Dissolved: 22 October 1947
- Superseding Ministry: Ministry of Defence
- Jurisdiction: French colonial empire
- Headquarters: Hôtel de la Marine; 48°52′00″N 2°19′23″E
- Minister responsible: Minister of the Navy

The Ministry of the Navy (French: Ministère de la Marine) was a section of the French government – apart from the Ministry of War – that was in charge of the French navy and colonies.

The ministry combined the administration of the navy, the colonies like New France and seaborne trade helping for example the French East India Company. A widely held view at the time was that for states to be powerful, wealthy and prestigious, colonies in the New World need to be maintained for their consequent trade. The maintenance of colonies through naval operations not only served to improve the stature of the state, but was also helpful in destroying their European rivals in North America.

After the Second World War, the Ministry of the Navy was merged with the War Ministry, absorbing the role of the Minister of the Navy and Colonies, with a Minister of National Defence directing the entire military French forces.

== Creation and history ==
Since the 16th century, the Secretary of State of the Navy (French: Secrétaire d'État de la Marine) was responsible for the French early navy and colonies.

In 1624, Louis XIII's first minister, Cardinal Richelieu created the first model of the modern French Navy, also known as the Marine or La Royale, run by the Secretary of State of the Navy. The official French Marine was not established until 7 March 1669 by Jean-Baptiste Colbert. At this time, the ministry of marine became an official government department with a permanent staff, holding offices at Versailles. All of the policies and procedures for the marine were established by Colbert.

The Secretary of State of the Navy was responsible for the administration of both the navy (the "marine royale") and civilian (merchant marine) fleets, and for all France's ports, arsenals, consulates, and colonies, as well as the guardianship for all her commercial companies.

The two French royal fleets (the Ponant fleet and Levant fleet) were put under the control of Colbert from 1662, whilst he was "intendant des finances" and "minister of state"—but not "secretary of state" : he only became secretary of state in 1669 after having bought his way into the post. From then on, right up to the French Revolution, a secretary of state had responsibility for the fleet.

To his two original offices (the bureau du Ponant and bureau du Levant) other services were added over time:

- Archives department, 1669
- Office of the Ponant consulates, 1709
- Office of the colonies, 1710
- Bureau des classes, 1711
- Department of maps and plans, 1720
- Office of the Levant Consulates, 1738, which was in 1743 merged with the Office of the Ponant Consulates under the name of Office of Commerce and Consulates

These different offices and departments were regrouped into four super-departments by marshal de Castries in 1786.

In 1791, the Secretary of State of the Navy was changed to Minister of the Navy. Before the 1890s, this position also usually had responsibility for France's colonies, and was usually known as Minister of the Navy and Colonies (French: Ministère de la Marine et des Colonies). In 1947 the naval ministry was absorbed into the Ministry of Defence.

== Science, Colonies, and the Navy ==
During King Louis XIV's time in power, came the official founding of the Ministry of Navy in 1669. During this time in French science, research was largely funded by ministers to the King and the King himself. This union of government and science led to endeavors with the objective of bolstering the nation's intellectual equity along with obtaining goods. The Ministry of Navy was used by the government and the crown to enact science during this time, especially in regards to colonies around the world, and especially in the West Indies. The French minister Jean-Baptiste Colbert put into place policy in the West Indies that would further the prosperity of the French empire. In 1664 he launched the West India Company which was given control over a large portion of the American hemisphere and along the coast of Africa.

France's scientific infrastructure quickly became some of the most advanced in the world and was used to maintain and start up colonies globally. The resources collected from the colonies were both intellectual and material, in an attempt to bring much esteem to the nation. France was dependent on the Ministry of Navy in helping to relay reliable information as to the locations of the colonies that were established.

Moving forward from the 1600s-1700s, France continued colonial-scientific efforts into the 1800s and 1900s. One such case is their attempts to establish colonies in Algeria during the 1830s. Due to the efforts of Chasseloup-Laubat, a scientist working for France, the Ministry of Navy was given access to iron covered and steam powered naval vessels. In Paris, France 1931, the government put on the Exposition coloniale internationale. The major emphasis was on the aquatic nature of the exposition and showcasing fish and other organisms from their different colonies. The Ministry of Navy was responsible for gathering these samples and then returning them safely to France.

== Personnel ==
At the head of the marine was the Ministre de la Marine, manned by a French statesman. Ministers of Marine typically came from families of administrative nobility (La Plume), such as the Phelypeaux's. From 1690 until 1749, a Phelypeaux was secretary and minister in charge of the marine and its colonies. The most prominent of the family was Jean-Frederic Phelypeaux, comte de Pontchartrain et Maurepas. Under his guidance, the marine regained much of the strength and prestige that it had lost during the period of the Regencies (1715–1726). As well, he was able to ascertain much larger than normal budgets for the Marine. Thus under Jean-Frederic's leadership, France was able to regain its reputation as a maritime power.

== Bibliography ==
- Jean-Philippe Zanco, Dictionnaire des Ministres de la Marine 1689-1958, S.P.M. Kronos, Paris 2011.
