= Heliopolis Palace =

One of the Egyptian presidential palaces and residences

Coordinates: 30°5′18″N 31°19′12″E

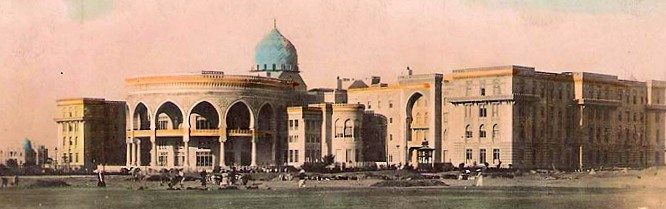
- Exterior of the Heliopolis Palace
- Alternative names: Kasr Al Ittihadia

General information
- Status: Active
- Location: Heliopolis, Cairo, Egypt, Egypt
- Current tenants: President of Egypt
- Construction started: 1908
- Inaugurated: 1910
- Renovated: 1984
- Client: Abbas II
- Owner: Egyptian Government

Technical details
- Material: Reinforced concrete

Design and construction
- Architect: Ernest Jaspar

The Heliopolis Palace (Arabic: قصر رئاسة الجمهورية, Kasr Riasat Al Gomhouria, "Palace of the Presidency of the Republic" or قصر الاتحادية Kasr Al Ittihadia, "Federation Palace") is one of the five Egyptian presidential palaces and residences, the others being Abdeen Palace, Koubbeh Palace, Montaza Palace and Ras El Tin Palace, for the executive office of the President of Egypt. It is located in the suburb of Heliopolis, northeast of central Cairo and east of the Nile in Egypt. It was originally built as the grand Heliopolis Palace Hotel in 1910. Now it is for the use of the President of Egypt.

== History ==
=== Heliopolis Palace Hotel (1910–1958) ===
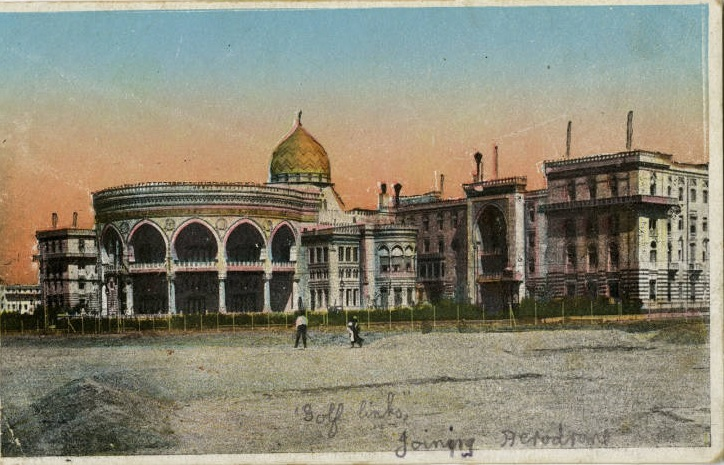
Postcard of the Heliopolis Palace Hotel

The palace was originally built as the luxurious Heliopolis Palace Hotel in the open desert from 1908 to 1910, while development of the new suburb began around it, by the Heliopolis Oases Company was ongoing. The hotel was designed by Ernest Jaspar as part of the larger Heliopolis project being done by Édouard Empain.

Billed as the most luxurious hotel in Africa and the Middle East, the Heliopolis Palace Hotel became, because of its grand architecture, an exclusive destination for guests including foreign royalty and international business tycoons. Guests included Milton S. Hershey and King Albert I and Queen Elisabeth of Belgium.

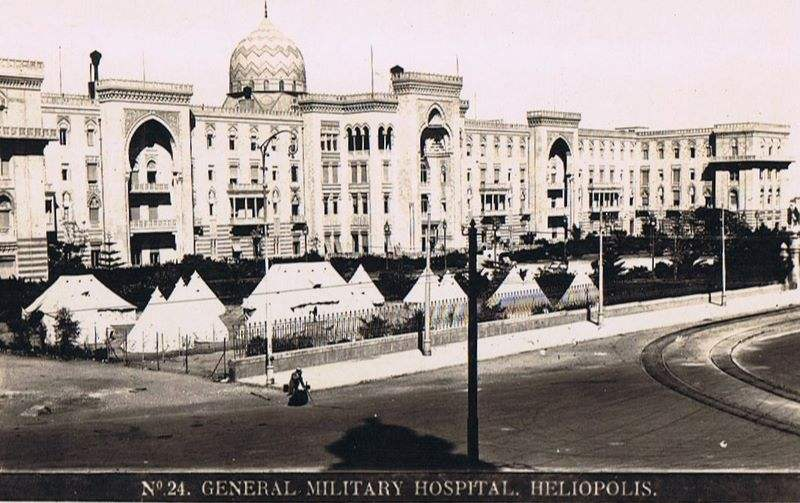
The hotel serving as a military hospital during WWI

During the First World War, the Heliopolis Palace Hotel was transformed into a military hospital for Australian troops. The hospital employed students and nuns from the nearby Collège du Sacré-Cœur. The hospital was one of the largest and grandest in the campaign and was referred to in Australian press as "the Hospital in a palace." It made use of ambulances and had beds and tents lined up for miles along the road, making it able to treat thousands of Commonwealth troops at a time.

=== Interim (1958–1980) ===
In 1958, the hotel was purchased by the Egyptian government and closed. It was used to house government offices. In January 1972, the building became the headquarters of the Federation of Arab Republics, the short-lived political union between Egypt, Libya and Syria, which gave it the current Arabic name of قصر الاتحادية Kasr Al Ittihadia ("Federation Palace").

=== Presidential palace ===
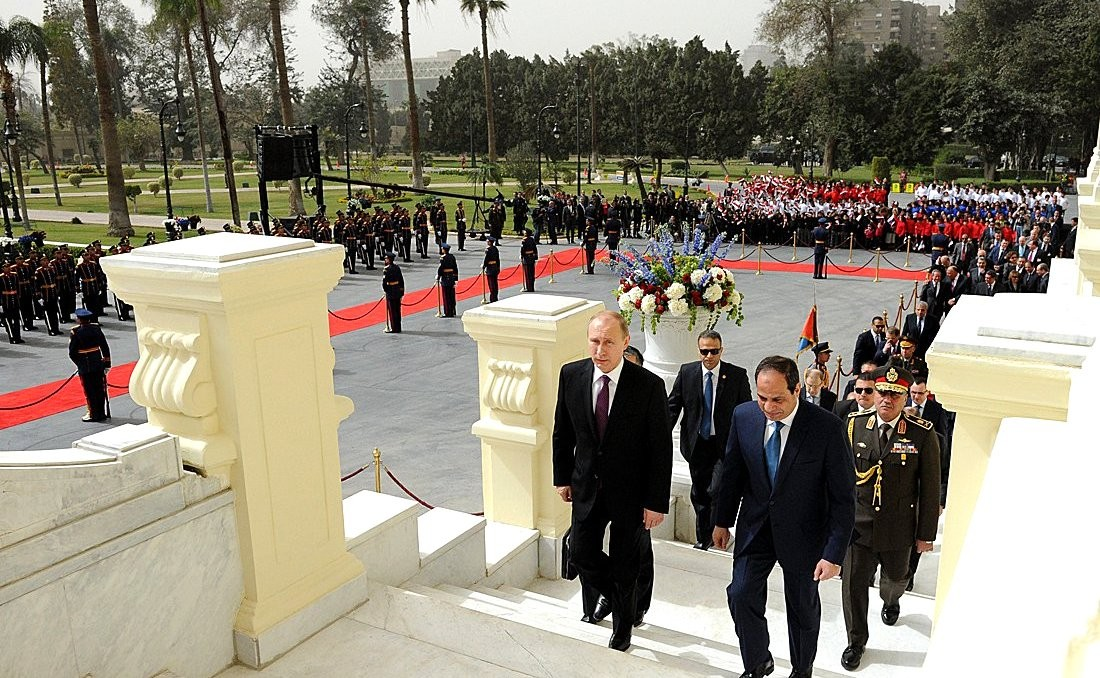
Abdel Fattah el-Sisi and Vladimir Putin at the palace.

In the 1980s, after extensive renovation and restoration efforts, the building became an Egyptian presidential palace and the headquarters of the administration of the new president, Hosni Mubarak. Today it is perhaps one of the more restricted presidential palaces regarding access. It is surrounded by simple gardens.

== Architecture ==
The landmark hotel was designed by Belgian architect Ernest Jaspar. He introduced the local Heliopolis style of architecture, a synthesis of Persian, Moorish Revival, Islamic, and European Neoclassical architecture. It was built by the contracting firms Leon Rolin & Co. and Padova, Dentamaro & Ferro, the two largest civil contractors in Egypt then. Siemens & Schuepert of Berlin fitted the hotel's web of electric cables and installations. The utilities were to the most modern standards of their day. The hotel operations were under French administered management.

The Heliopolis architectural style, responsible for many original buildings in Heliopolis, was expressed in the Heliopolis Palace Hotel's exterior and interior design. The hotel had 400 rooms, including 55 private apartments. Beyond the Moorish Revival reception hall two public rooms were lavishly decorated in the Louis XIV and the Louis XV styles. Beyond those was the Central Hall, the primary public dining space.

The Central Hall's dome measured 55 metres (180 ft) from floor to ceiling. The 589 square metres (6,340 ft^{2}) hall's architectural interior was designed by Alexander Marcel of the French Institute, and decorated by Georges-Louis Claude. Twenty-two Italian marble columns circled the parquet floor up to the elaborate ceilings. The hall was carpeted with fine Persian carpets and had large mirrored wall panels and a substantial marble fireplace. To one side of the Central Hal was the Grillroom seating 150 guests, and to the other was the billiards hall, with two full-sized British Thurston billiard tables and a 'priceless' French one. The private banquet halls were quite large and elaborate.

The mahogany furniture was ordered from Maple's of London. Damascus-made 'East Orient style' lamps, lanterns, and chandeliers hung throughout. The upper gallery contained oak-paneled reading and card rooms furnished by Krieger of Paris. The basement and staff areas were so large that a narrow gauge railway was installed running the length of the hotel, passing by offices, kitchens, pantries, refrigerators, storerooms and the staff mess.

== See also ==
- Ancient Heliopolis
- Modern Heliopolis
- New Heliopolis City
- Koubbeh Palace
- Cairo Electric Railways and Heliopolis Oases Company

== Bibliography ==
- Dobrowolska, Agnieszka (2006). Heliopolis: Rebirth of the City of the Sun (Paperback) (First ed.). American University in Cairo Press. p. 176. ISBN 977-416-008-8.
- E.Godoli, M.Giacomelli (2005). Architetti e ingegneri italiani dal Levante al Magrèb 1848-1945. Repertorio biografico, bibliografico e archivistico (Archivi dell'architett. ital. d'oltremare) (in Italian). Maschietto Editore. p. 400. ISBN 88-88967-47-8.
- Ilbert, Robert (1981). Héliopolis, le Caire 1905-1922 : genèse d'une ville (in French). Marseille, Paris: Centre national de la recherche scientifique. p. 153. ISBN 978-2-222-02954-0.
- Volait, Mercedes (dir.) (2001). Le Caire - Alexandrie Architecture Europeennes 1850-1950 (Paperback) (in French). Le Caire: Archeolog, IFAO/CEDEJ. p. 252. ISBN 2-7247-0290-5.
- M.C.Bruwier, A.Van Loo (2010). Héliopolis (Hardcover) (in French). Brussels: Fonds Mercator. p. 229. ISBN 978-90-6153-930-8.
