= Baron Empain Palace =

Architectural structure in Heliopolis, a suburb near Cairo, Egypt

- قصر البارون إمبان
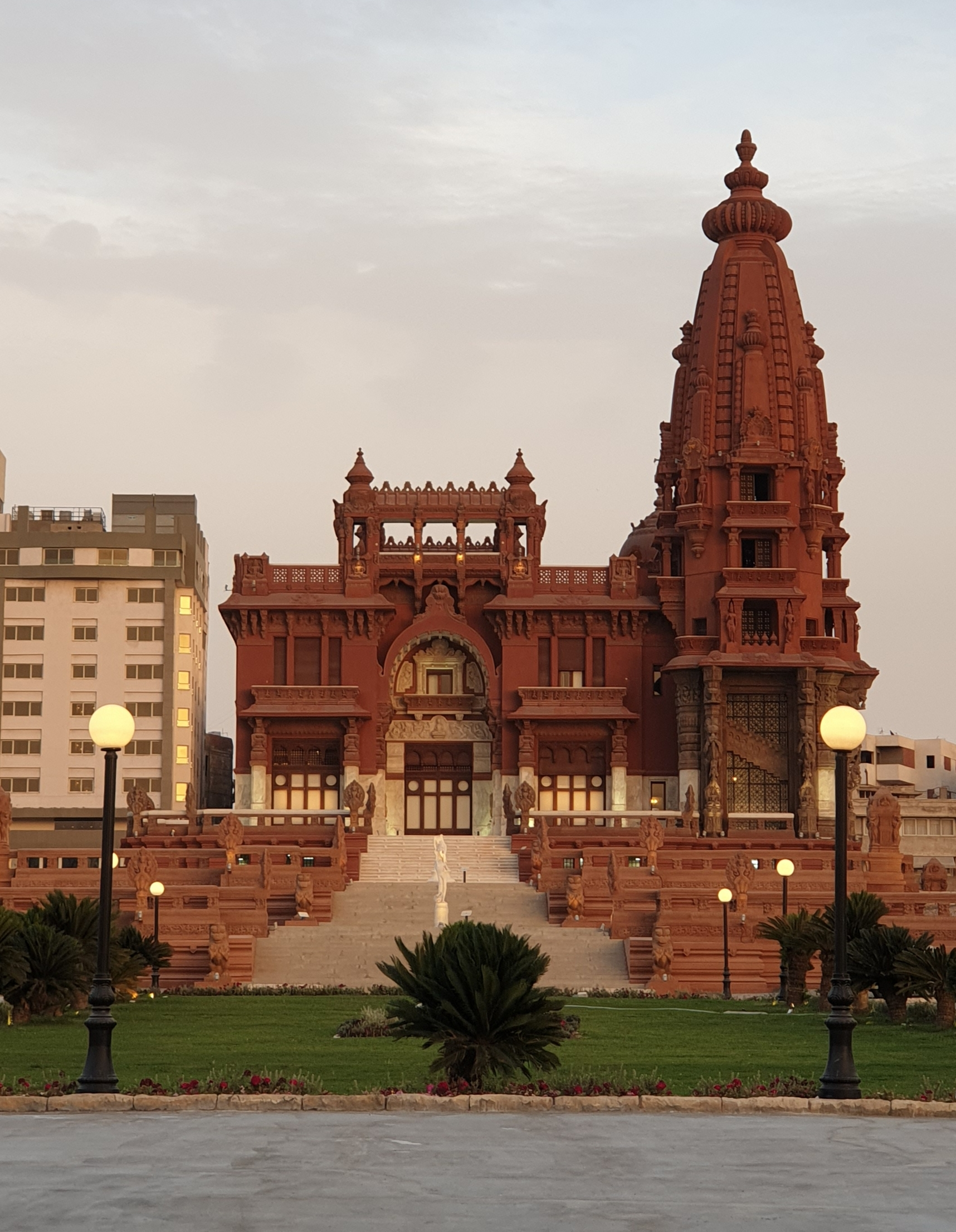
- Exterior of the Baron Empain Palace, 2020
- Alternative names: Le Palais Hindou

General information
- Status: Renovated
- Type: Private house
- Architectural style: Heliopolis style
- Location: Heliopolis, Cairo, Egypt
- Coordinates: 30°05′12″N 31°19′49″E
- Construction started: 1907
- Inaugurated: 1911
- Renovated: 2016–present
- Client: Édouard Empain
- Owner: Egyptian State

Technical details
- Material: Reinforced concrete
- Floor count: 3

Design and construction
- Architect: Alexandre Marcel

The Baron Empain Palace (Arabic: قصر البارون إمبان, "Qasr el Baron Emban"), also known as Le Palais Hindou (lit. 'The Hindu Palace'), is a distinctive and historic mansion in Heliopolis, a suburb northeast of central Cairo, Egypt. It was built in 1905 for Édouard Empain, Baron Empain, a Belgian businessman and industrialist with particular interests in tramways. The building was inspired architecturally by Hindu temples.

== History ==
=== Inception and construction ===
The palace in 2021

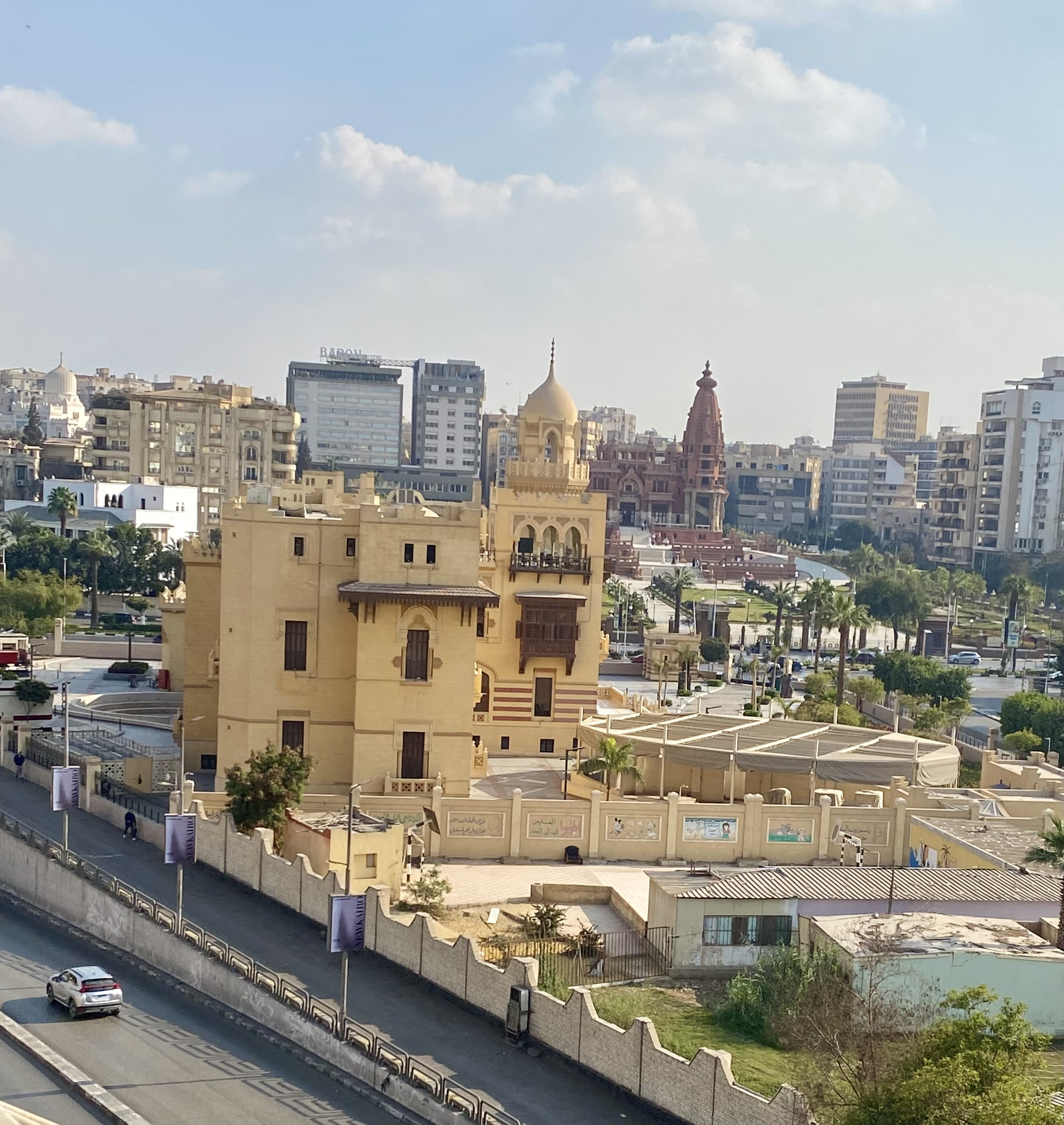
Sultana Malak Palace in front, with the iconic Baron Empain Palace in the background, two historic landmarks of Heliopolis.

In 1904, Baron Édouard Empain came to Egypt with the intention of expanding his commercial empire and to build railway lines in Egypt. By 1906, the Baron hired the architect Ernest Jaspar to help create a unique aesthetic in the suburbs of Heliopolis dubbed the "Heliopolis style." Including aspects of Persian elements to neoclassical European aspects, the newly established city of Heliopolis would become a cultural center of Egypt attracting people from all over the world. Hospitals, restaurants, banks, and stores among other created infrastructure and establishments also contributed to the allure of the newly founded Heliopolis. The Baron also held an exclusive event at his palace to celebrate its completion.

The Hindu-temple-styled building housed Baron Empain as well as his wife, two sons, and an alleged daughter. According to widely spread rumors, the Baron's daughter is said to have suffered from some kind of medical or mental condition that required her to be hidden from the outside world, as these qualities in a child were greatly frowned upon. Other legends surrounding the family imply that either the daughter or the Baron's wife committed suicide inside the palace, which would later contribute to the belief that the Hindu Palace was haunted and inspire the ghost tourism being labeled a national monument.

=== Later history ===
After the Baron's death in 1929 and the 1952 revolution that took place in Egypt, the palace was left abandoned. Decades later, in the 1990s, there was social revolution against many conservative values of Islam and young people began to trespass and vandalize the palace. They were mostly doing drugs and throwing parties in a counter culture; however, the conservative backlash would insist these young adults were practicing Satanism based on previous rumors of the past and a prejudice against nontraditional values.

The palace was acquired by the Egyptian government in 2005 on the occasion of the centenary of Heliopolis and it was classified as a "historical monument" by the Supreme Council of Egyptian Antiquities in March 2007. In 2012, an agreement was signed with the Belgian government to jointly restore the building and turn it into an international art and cultural center. According to Egyptian Minister of Antiquities, Khaled al-Anany, preparations for the first phase of the building's renovation began at the end of November 2016.

== Architecture ==
The palace was designed by Alexandre Marcel, a French architect and a member of the French Institute. The palace's interior was constructed and decorated by Georges-Louis Claude. Inspired mostly by Angkor Wat in Cambodia and by the Hindu temples of Orissa in East India, it was built between 1907 and 1911, in reinforced concrete, which was considered a symbol of luxury and status at the time. The building is impressive with the richness of its ornamentation, which includes monkeys, elephants, lions and snakes, as well as statues of Buddha, Shiva, Krishna and other Hindu deities.

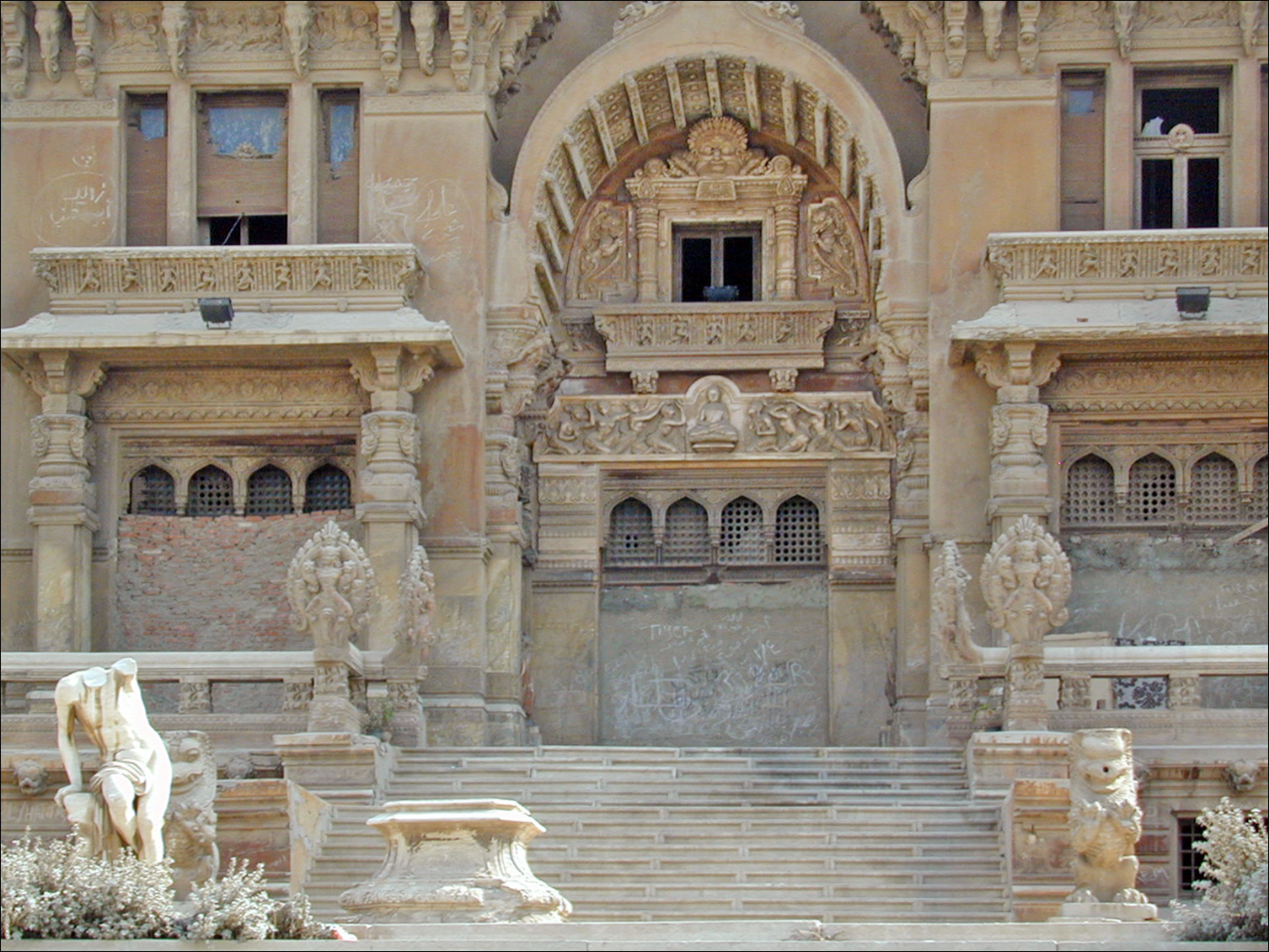
The entrance to the palace overlooking the garden

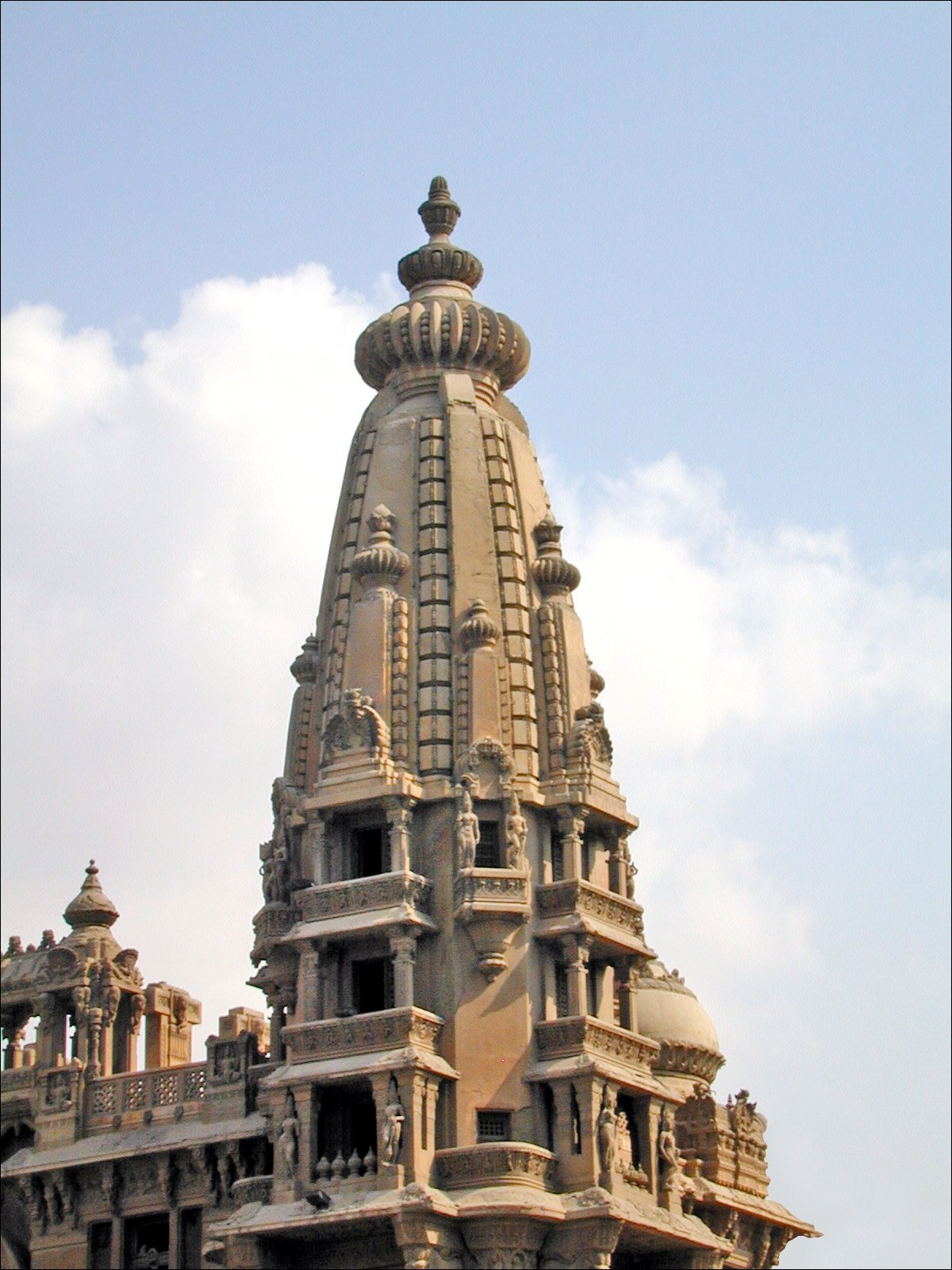
Closeup of the palace's tower

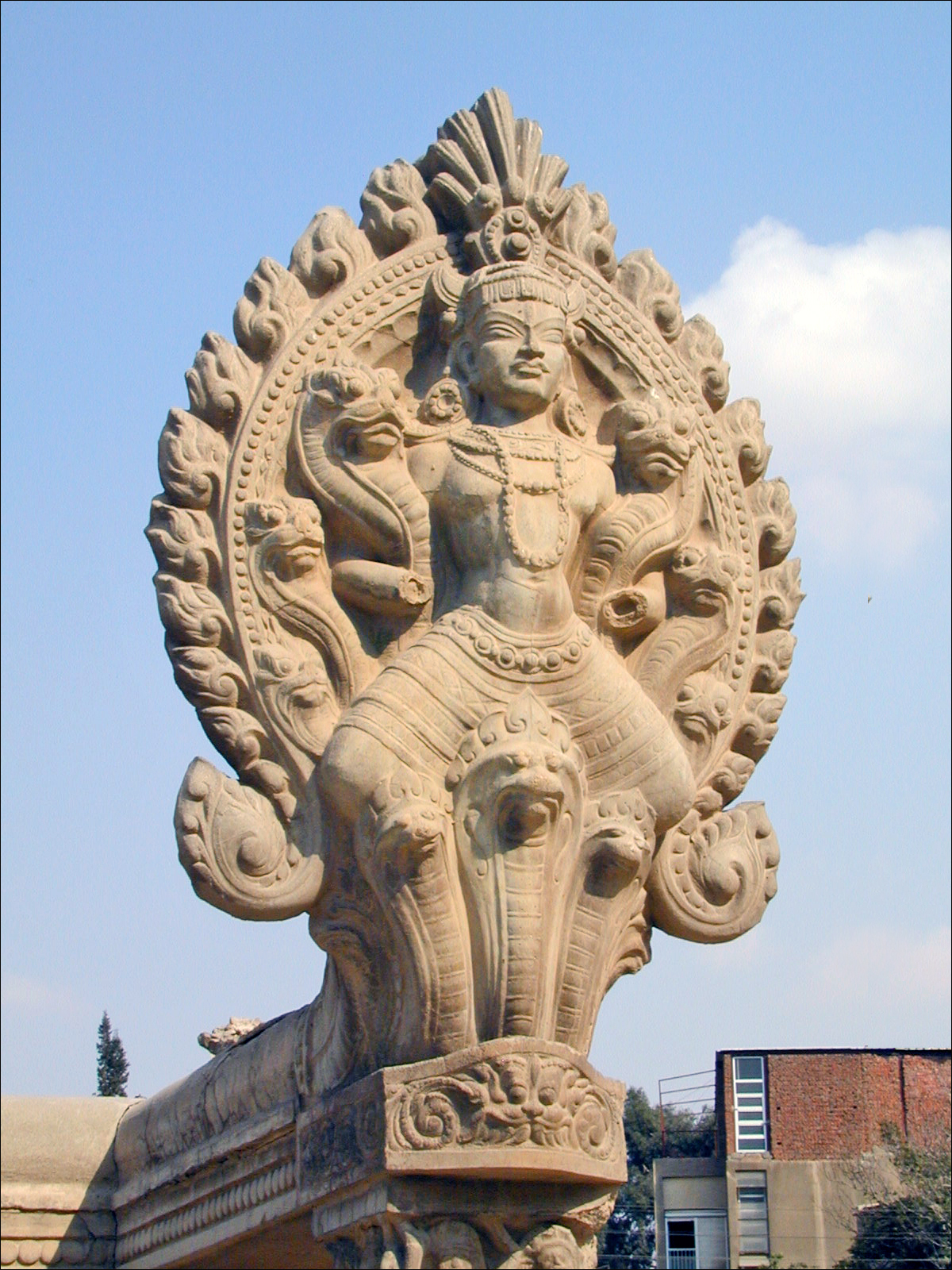
Balustrade with Shiva on a Naga

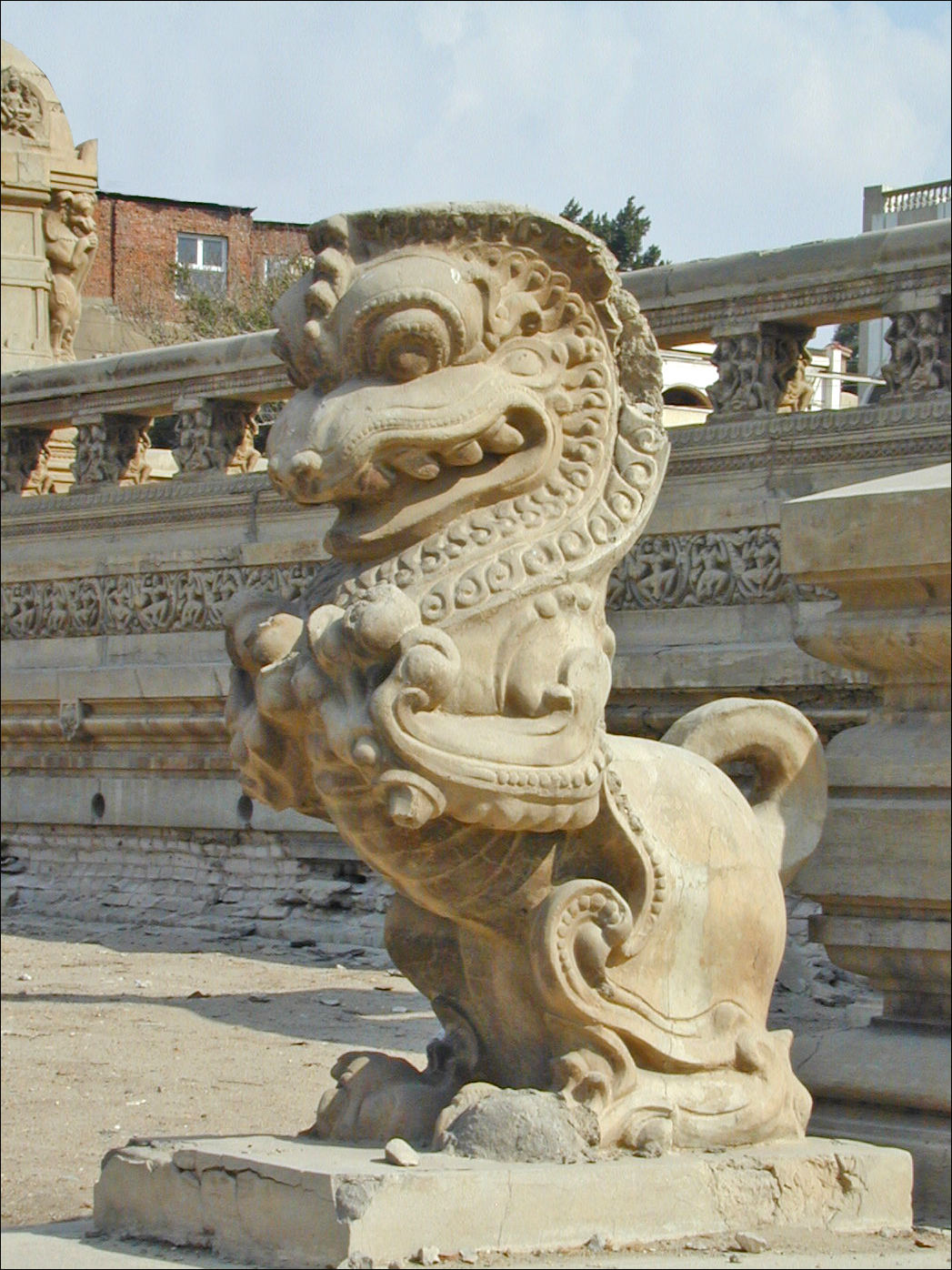
Statue of lion, door guardian, in Khmer style

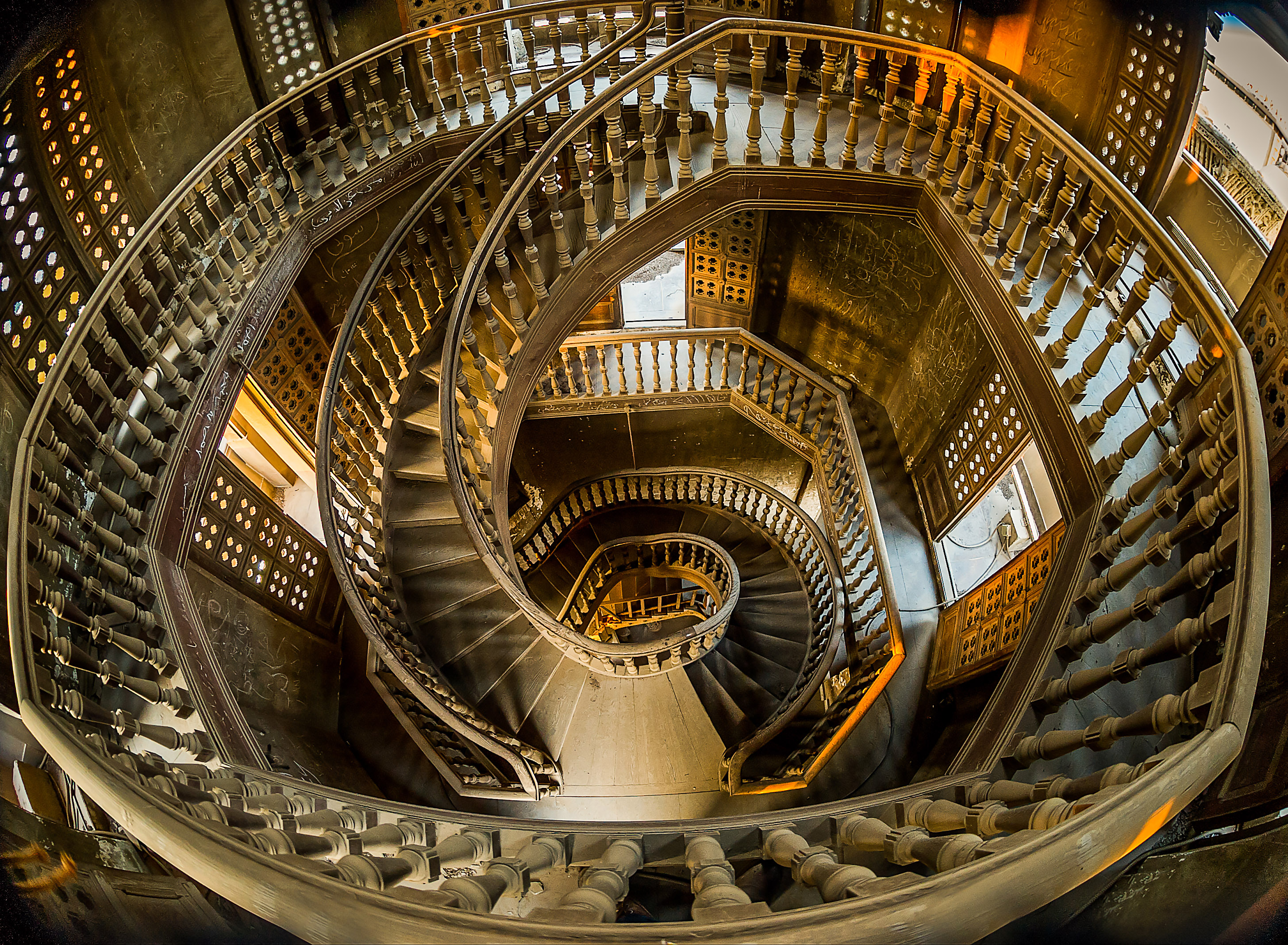
The spiral staircase

== See also ==
- List of buildings in Cairo
- Architecture of Egypt
- Cultural tourism in Egypt
- Orientalism
