= New Heliopolis =

New Heliopolis هليوبوليس الجديدة
- suburb
- Location in Egypt
- Country: Egypt
- Governorate: Cairo
- Established: 1995

Area
  - Total: 9.7 sq mi (25 km^{2})
- Time zone: UTC+2 (EET)
  - Summer (DST): UTC+3 (EEST)

New Heliopolis (Arabic: هليوبوليس الجديدة) is a large 5400-acre real estate development, it is a part of El Shorouk City, Cairo Governorate, Egypt. Land for the development was allocated by the Presidential Decree 193/1995 to the Heliopolis Company for Housing and Development, making it the company's largest land allocation since it bought its original 6100-acre plot to build the Heliopolis Oasis in 1905.

The development has sold plots to individuals, as well sold to, or partnered with companies to build gated communities, reducing the area under the company's ownership by 2021 to just under 4000 acres.

== Location ==
New Heliopolis is connected by the Cairo-Ismailia road from the north and by the Cairo–Suez road from the south. It also borders Madinaty to the south, the original settlement of El Shorouk to the west and the satellite city of Badr to the east. The development benefits from its connection to the Regional Ring Road which links it to all of Greater Cairo. It is located 25 minutes from the district of Heliopolis and Nasr City.

== Climate ==
Köppen-Geiger climate classification system classifies its climate as hot desert (BWh), as the rest of Egypt.

Climate data for New Heliopolis City
Month	Jan	Feb	Mar	Apr	May	Jun	Jul	Aug	Sep	Oct	Nov	Dec	Year
Mean daily maximum °C (°F)	18.1 (64.6)	19.8 (67.6)	23.2 (73.8)	27.8 (82.0)	32.1 (89.8)	34.4 (93.9)	35 (95)	34.6 (94.3)	31.9 (89.4)	29.8 (85.6)	24.9 (76.8)	20.1 (68.2)	27.6 (81.8)
Daily mean °C (°F)	12.8 (55.0)	14 (57)	16.6 (61.9)	20.3 (68.5)	24.2 (75.6)	26.9 (80.4)	27.9 (82.2)	27.9 (82.2)	25.5 (77.9)	23.5 (74.3)	19.3 (66.7)	14.7 (58.5)	21.1 (70.0)
Mean daily minimum °C (°F)	7.6 (45.7)	8.2 (46.8)	10.1 (50.2)	12.9 (55.2)	16.4 (61.5)	19.4 (66.9)	20.8 (69.4)	21.2 (70.2)	19.2 (66.6)	17.2 (63.0)	13.8 (56.8)	9.4 (48.9)	14.7 (58.4)
Average precipitation mm (inches)	6 (0.2)	4 (0.2)	4 (0.2)	2 (0.1)	0 (0)	0 (0)	0 (0)	0 (0)	0 (0)	1 (0.0)	4 (0.2)	5 (0.2)	26 (1.1)
Source: Climate-Data.org (altitude: 214m)

== See also ==
- Badr
- Cairo Electric Railways and Heliopolis Oases Company
- El Shorouk
- Greater Cairo
- Heliopolis style
