= Robida =

Robida is a Slovenian and French surname Notable people with the surname include:

- Adolf Robida (1885–1928), Slovenian playwright, journalist, and translator
- Albert Robida (1848–1926), French illustrator, etcher, lithographer, caricaturist, and novelist
- Camille Robida (1880–1938), French architect
- Henri Robida (1902–1933), French aviator
- Ivan Robida (1871–1941), Slovenian neurologist, psychiatrist, poet, writer and playwright
- Jacob D. Robida (1987–2006), American murderer
- Karel Robida (1804–1877), Slovenian physicist, monk and writer
- Michel Robida (1909–1991), French journalist and writer

== See also ==
- Robidas
