= Lycée Al-Horreya =

Lycée Al-Horreya may refer to:

- Lycée La Liberté Héliopolis, a French-language school in Cairo
- Lycée Français d'Alexandrie, a French-language school in Alexandria
