= Heliopolis, Cairo =

Locality in Cairo

Heliopolis حي مصر الجديدة وحي النزهة Masr al-Gadida and al-Nozha districts
- Suburb (initial), two districts (today)
- Location of Heliopolis within Egypt
- Coordinates: 30°06′N 31°20′E
- Country: Egypt
- Governorate: Cairo
- Established: 1906; 120 years ago

Area
  - Urban: 25 km^{2} (9.7 sq mi)

Population
  - Estimate (2022-01): 387,000 (Masr al-Gadida and al-Nozha districts)
- Time zone: UTC+2 (EET)
  - Summer (DST): UTC+3 (EEST)

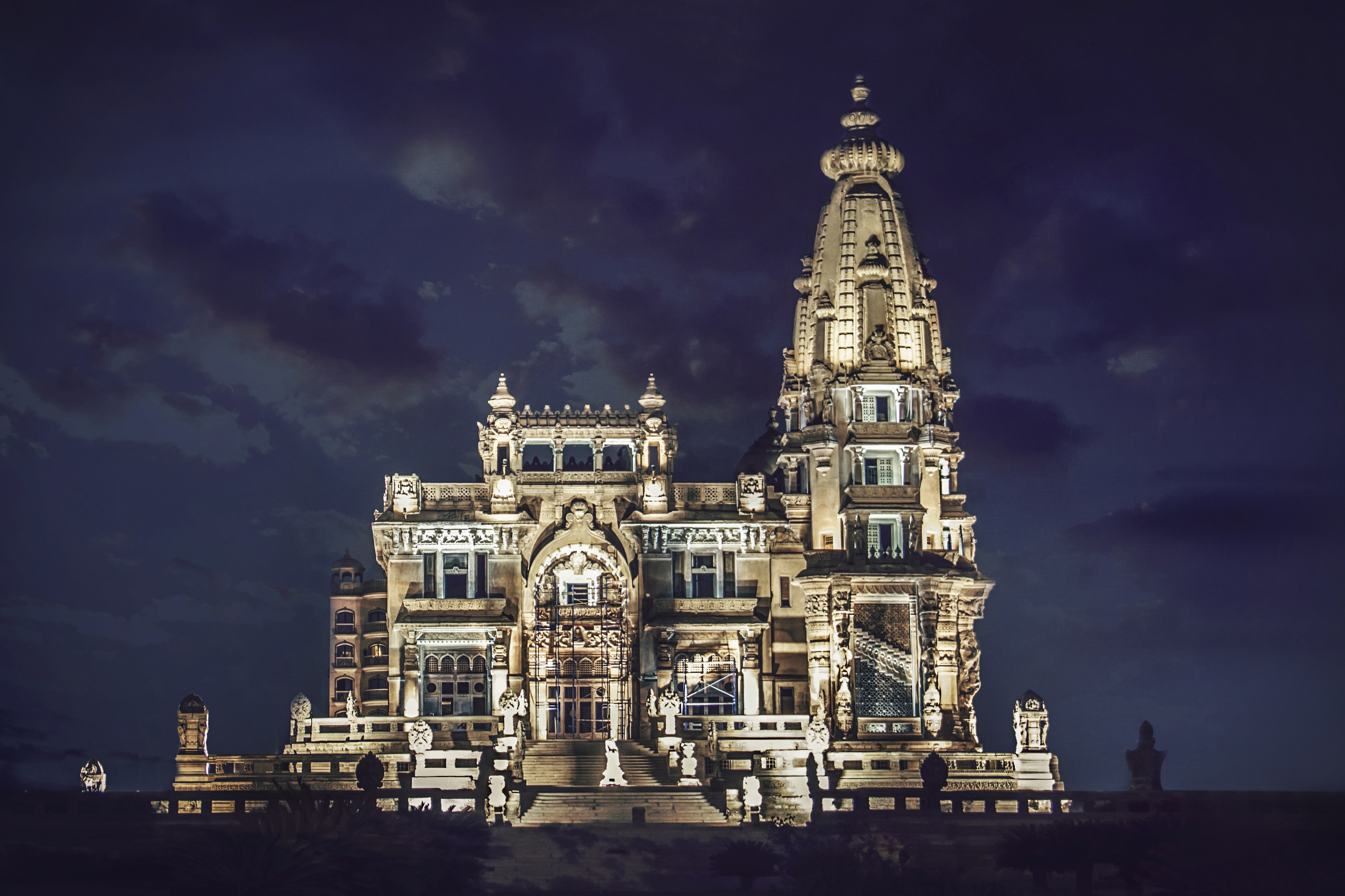
The exterior of Baron Empain Palace

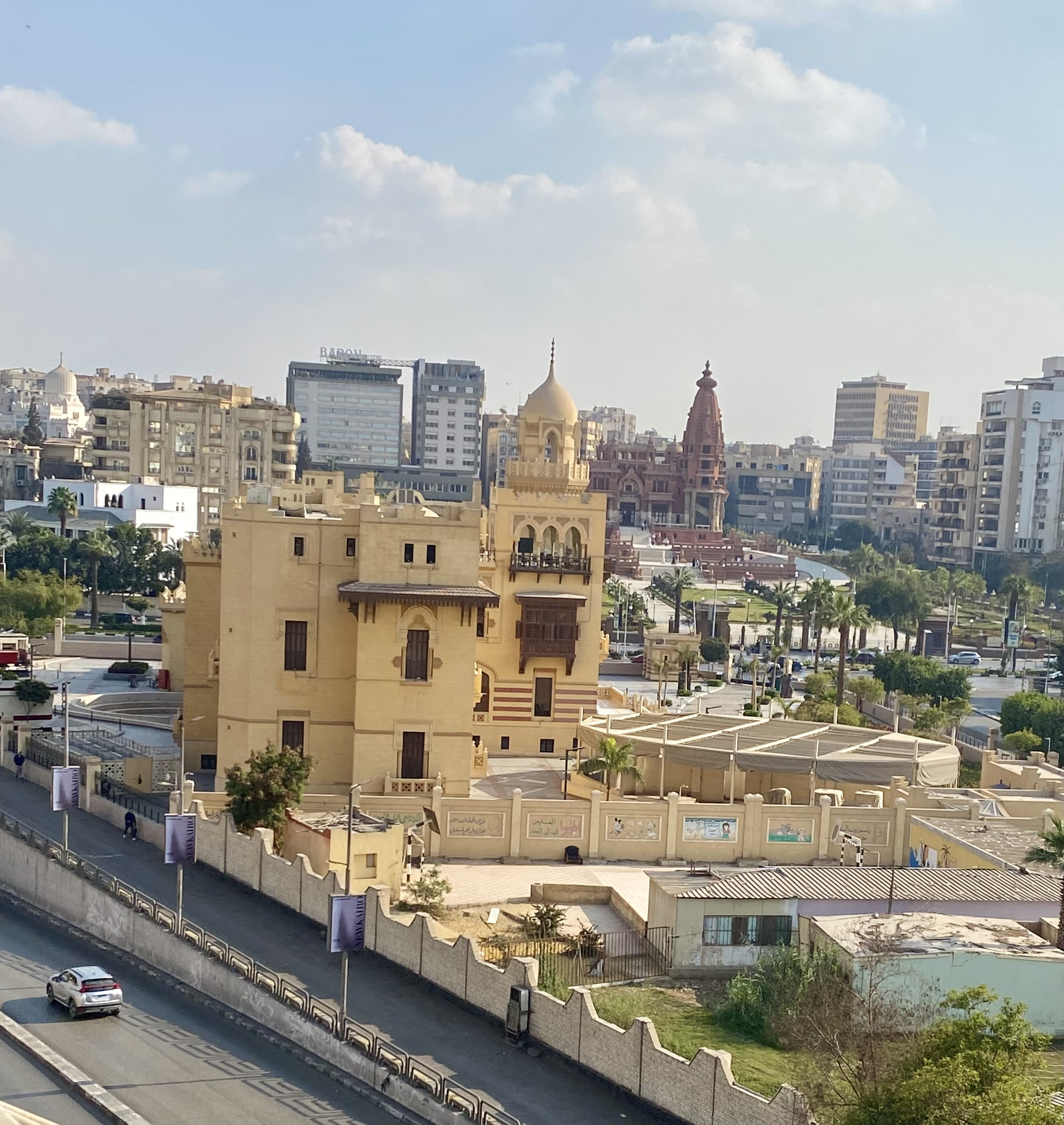
Sultana Malak Palace in front, with the iconic Baron Empain Palace in the background, two historic landmarks of Heliopolis.

Heliopolis (Arabic: مصر الجديدة, romanized: Miṣr al-Jadīda, Egyptian Arabic pronunciation: [ˈmɑsˤɾ el ɡɪˈdiːdæ, -eɡ-], lit. "New Egypt") was an early 20th-century suburb outside Cairo, Egypt, which has since merged with Cairo and is administratively divided into the districts of Masr El Gedida and El Nozha in the Eastern Area.

Named after the ancient Egyptian city of Heliopolis, whose ruins have been found in nearby Ain Shams, modern Heliopolis was established in 1905 by the Heliopolis Oasis Company headed by the Belgian industrialist Édouard Empain and by Boghos Nubar, son of the Egyptian Prime Minister Nubar Pasha.

The population in January 2022 of Masr El Gedida was estimated to be 142,017; 244,869 in El-Nozha.

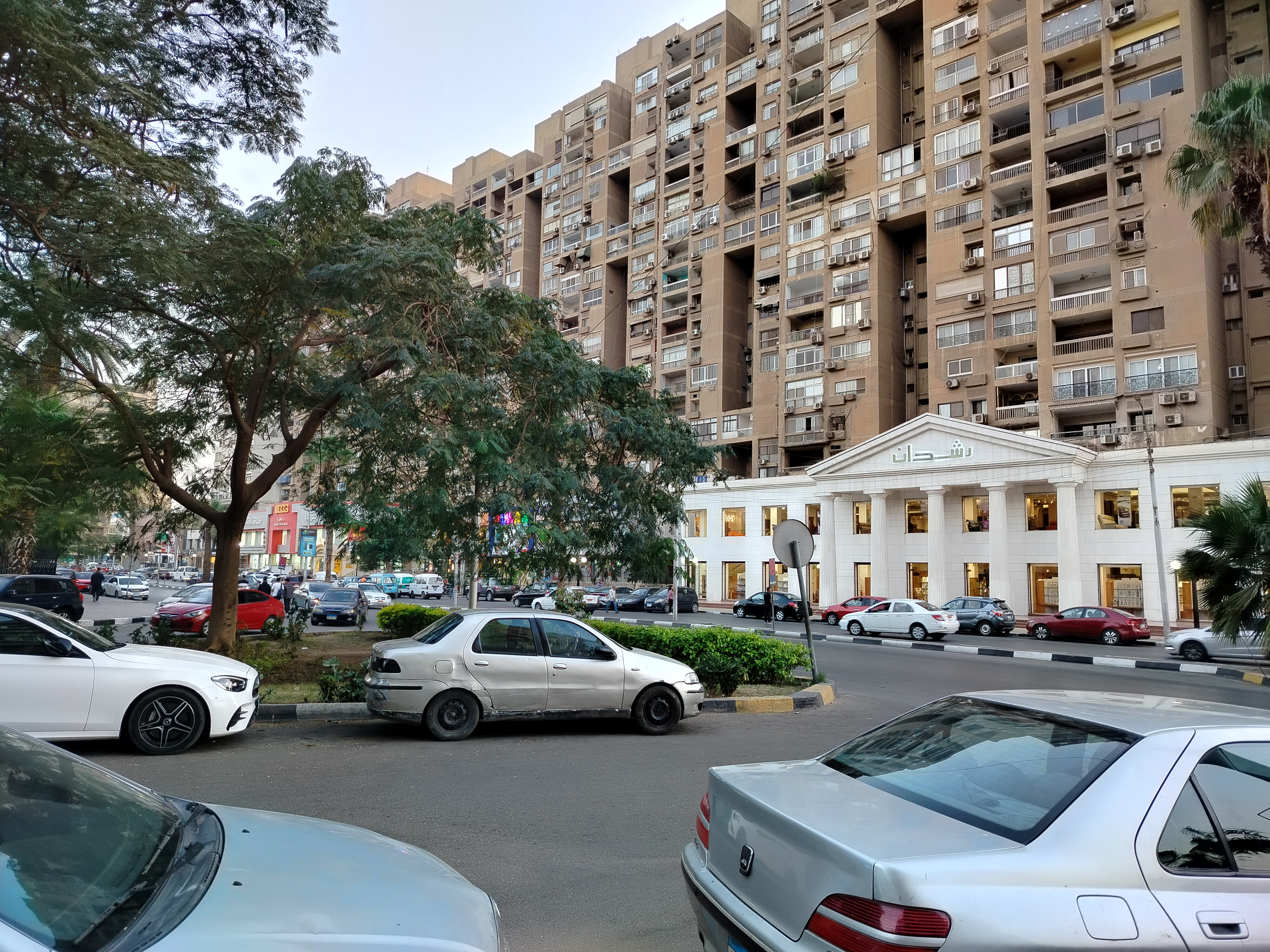
El-Fath street

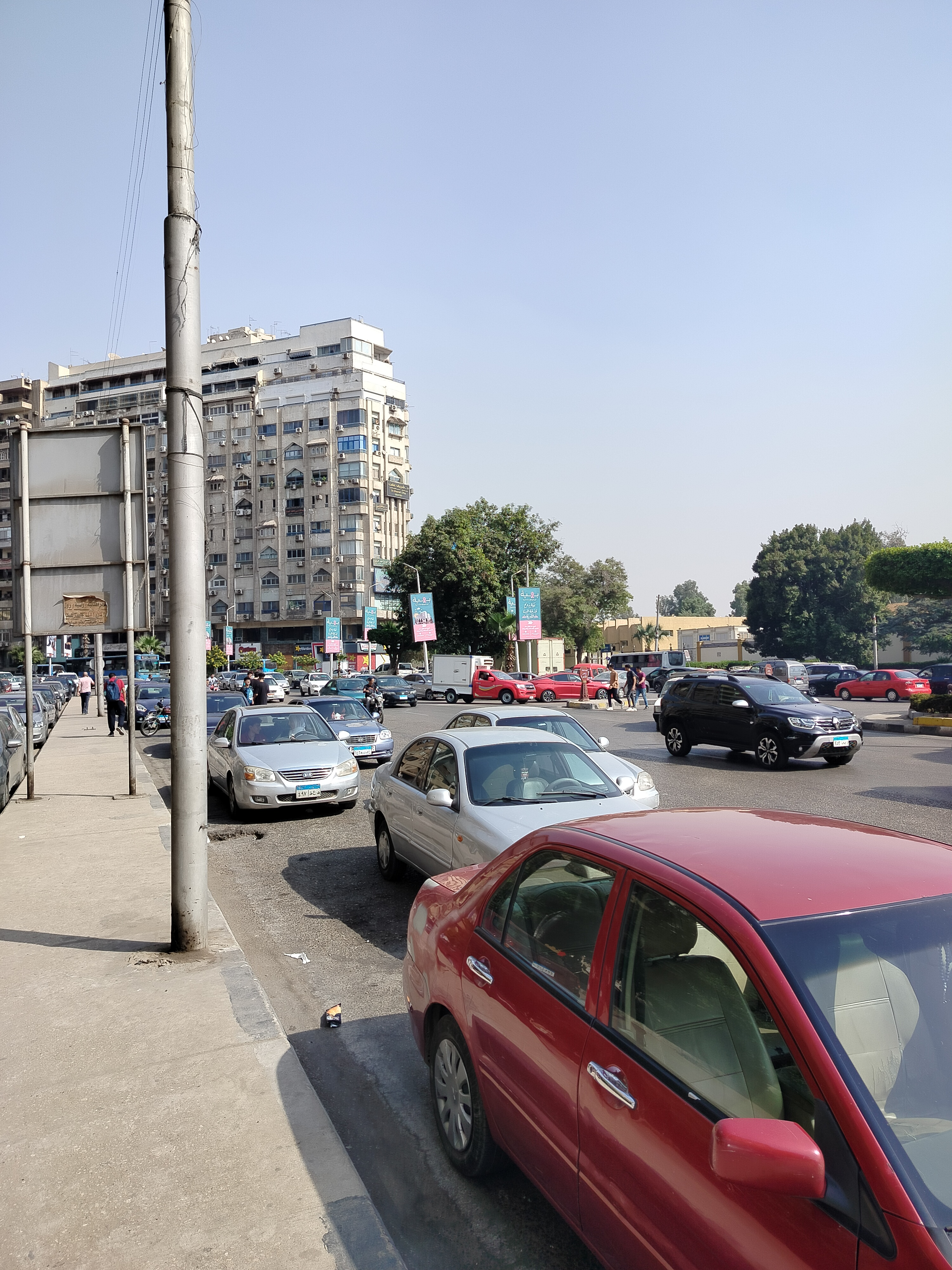
Al Khalifa Al Ma'moun street

== History ==
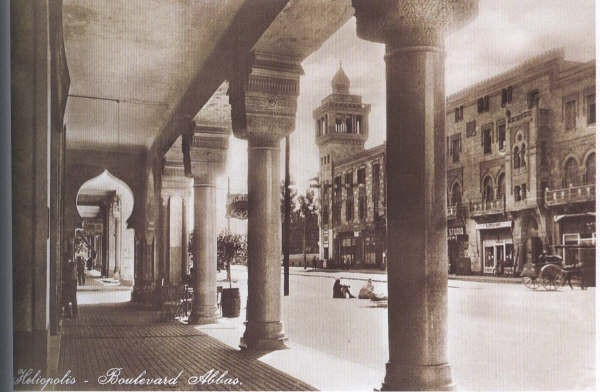
Suburban avenues in Heliopolis

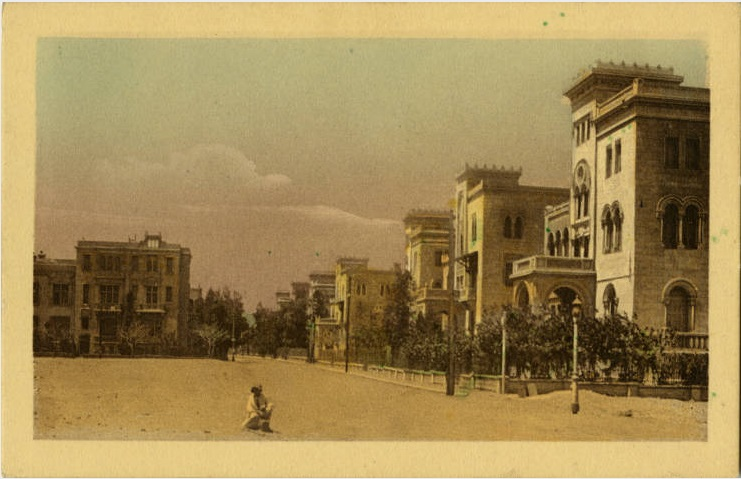
Heliopolis – Boulevard Ibrahim

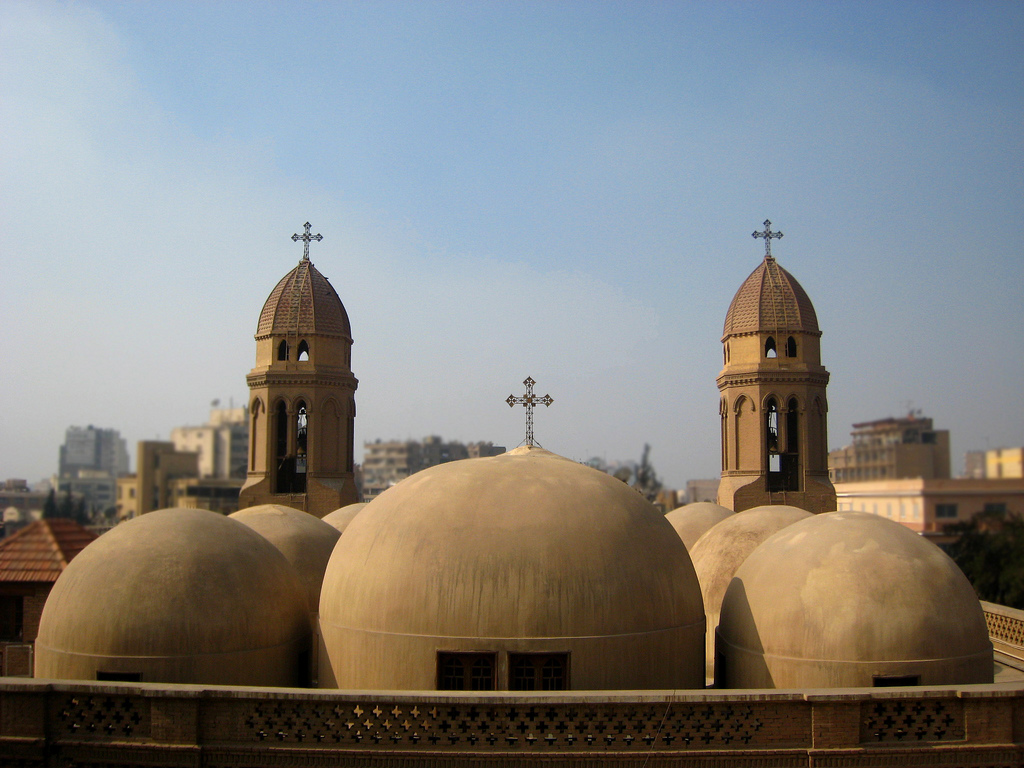
The domes of Saint Mark's Church, one of the oldest Coptic churches in Heliopolis

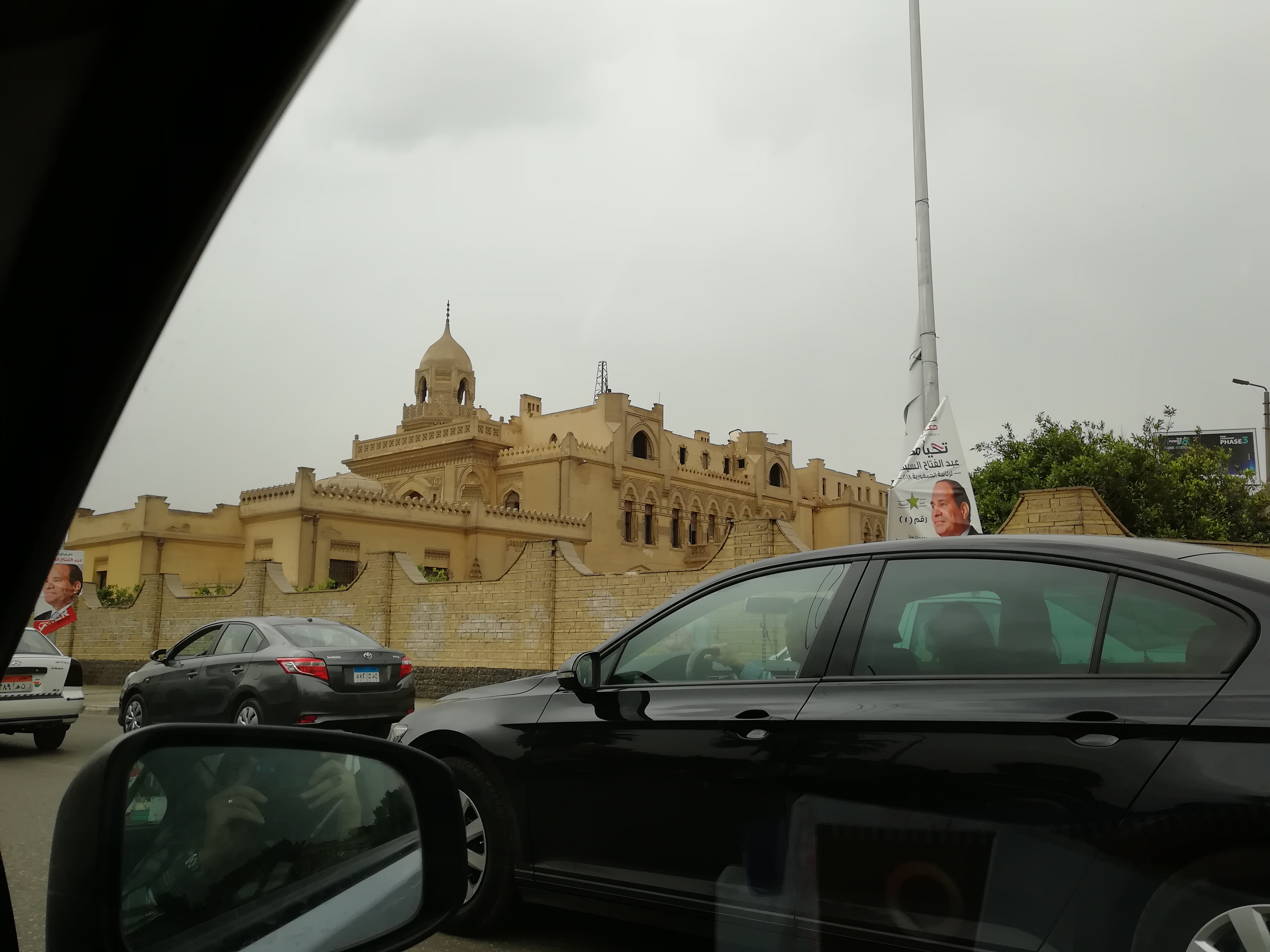
Sultana Malak Palace, which became a school in 1960

The rise of real estate prices in Egypt coupled with the increasing numbers of expatriates living in the country inspired the Belgian industrialist Édouard Empain, 1st Baron Empain to build a new suburb of Cairo. In 1905, his company, Chemins de fer de la Basse-Egypte bought 2,500 hectares (6,200 acres) of inexpensive desert 10 kilometres (6.2 mi) to the northeast of Cairo. A year later, he established The Cairo Electric Railways & Heliopolis Oases Company. The former would build a railway line linking Mansourah (on the Nile) to Matariya (on the far side of Lake Manzala from Port Said).

Initially, Heliopolis was designed to be an oasis in the desert, a "city of luxury and leisure", with 8% of its area reserved for public gardens, parks, and playgrounds. In the first design, it was to be composed of two separate oases connected to the center of Cairo by a tramline. The oasis nearest to Cairo would be a tourist area, with the Heliopolis Palace Hotel surrounded by luxurious homes. The other oasis would be factories and workers’ homes.

In 1907, Empain experienced financial difficulties. British financier Ernest Cassel stepped in and the city was redesigned. In the new design, Heliopolis was planned as a Garden City. Landmarks were connected by broad avenues, a la Paris, and entertainment facilities like Luna Amusement Park, golf courses and the Heliopolis Sporting Club were built to attract Europeans. It naturally had water, drains and electricity, and there was rental housing in a range of innovative designs targeting specific social classes with detached and terraced villas, apartment buildings, tenement blocks with balcony access, and workers' bungalows.

The master plan was created by the Belgian architect Ernest Jaspar, who blended Persian, Moorish and European Neoclassicism to create what is now known as the "Heliopolis style". British influence came through the urban planning concepts of Ebenezer Howard. Jaspar, French architect Alexandre Marcel, and Italian architect and engineer Antonio Lasciac built many grand buildings, including the Sultana Malak Palace, and the Heliopolis Palace. Marcel designed the Baron's palace according to a Neo Hindu style modelled on Angkor Wat in Cambodia and the Hindu temples of Orissa. Facing the Baron's palace was the Villa Boghos Nubar Pasha, now a military headquarters, and the residence of Sultan Hussein Kamel, who reigned over Egypt between 1914 and 1917; it is now a presidential guest house.

Young architects were brought in as assistants: the Belgians Augustin Van Arenbergh, Charles Willaert, and Antoine Courtens and, from France, Alexandre Collonge, Georges Chaillier and Camille Robida. Georges-Louis Claude oversaw decor and interiors.

The only Egyptian architect on the original team was Habib Ayrout, who focused on the practical housing that supported the suburb's early expansion–the middle-class homes and workers' homes. Ayrout embedded into European design local Egyptian elements such as arched facades, balcony screens and reception rooms. Ayrout also designed the Melkite Greek Catholic church Saint Cyril. Two of Ayrout's sons, architects Charles Ayrout and Maxime Ayrout, would continue to work on Heliopolis over the next few decades.

Heliopolis was originally filled primarily with aristocratic Egyptians, as well as some European nationals. Unlike other modern Cairo suburbs around the start of the 20th century, Heliopolis had a significantly larger percentage of Egyptian citizen residents. After the 1952 revolution led by Nasser, it became home to much of Cairo's educated upper and middle class. As Cairo has expanded, the once large distance between Heliopolis and Cairo has vanished and it is now well inside the city. Due to the rising population of Cairo following the Egyptian Revolution of 1952, in the 1960s, President Nasser built the Nasr City as an extension to Heliopolis.

The Heliopolis War Cemetery on Nabil el Wakkad street contains the Port Tewfik Memorial, a memorial to over 4,000 soldiers of the British Indian Army who fell in the First World War, which was originally in Port Tewfik, but was relocated to Heliopolis after its destruction in the 1970s. And, due to the large growth in population, the original gardens that filled the city have been built over.

== Administrative divisions and population ==
Heliopolis today is administratively divided into the districts of Masr El-Gedida and El-Nozha in the Eastern Area of Cairo.

Masr al-Gadia had a population of 134,116 in 2017 divided into four shiakhas:

Shiakha	Code 2017	Population
Muntazah, el-	013903	17,923
Manshiyyat el-Bakri	013904	48,414
Bustân, el-	013901	34,616
Almâẓa	013902	33,163

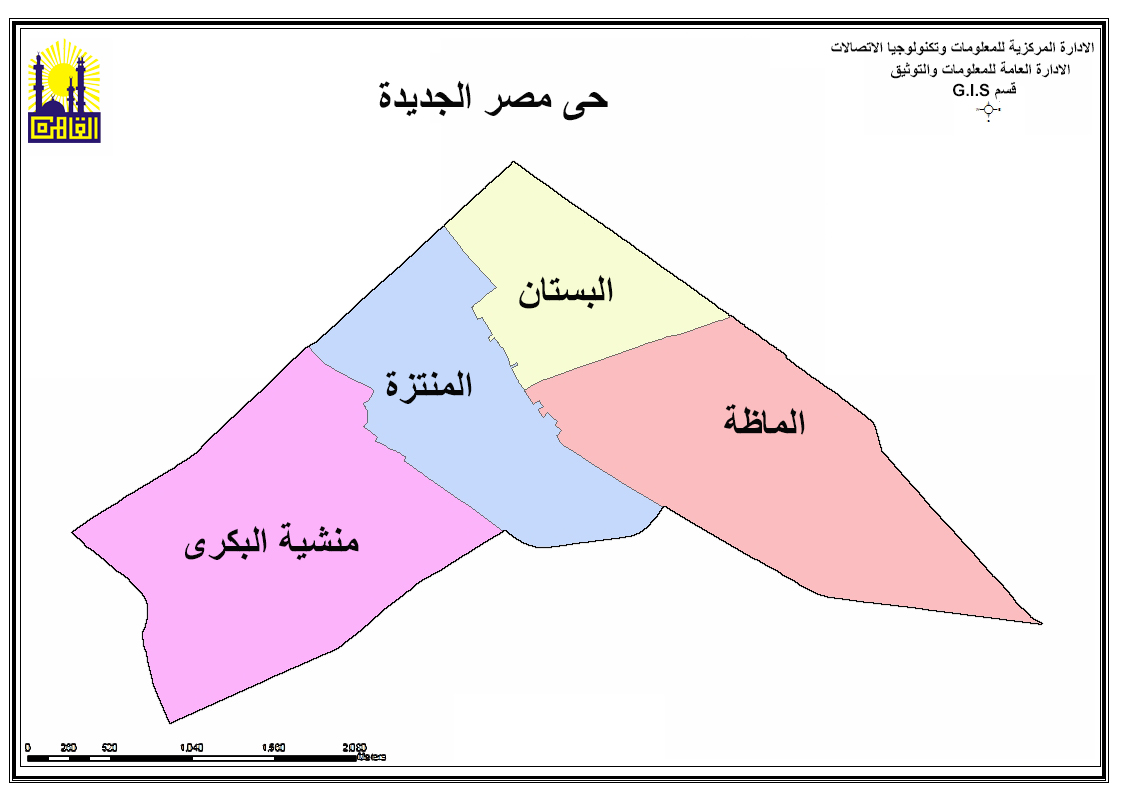
Administrative map of Masr el-Gedida district, Cairo, Egypt (in Arabic)

El-Nozha had 231,241 people in 2017 over its four shiakhas:

Shiakha	Code 2017	Population
Sheraton el-Maṭâr (Sheraton airport)	013804	60,482
Nuzha, al-	013801	47,570
Maṭâr el-Qahira (Cairo airport)	013803	77,465
Hâykstib, el- (Huckstep)	013802	45,724

Note: The remaining shiakhas on the Nozha map are now part of Shorouk and Badr new cities under the jurisdiction of the New Urban Communities Authority.

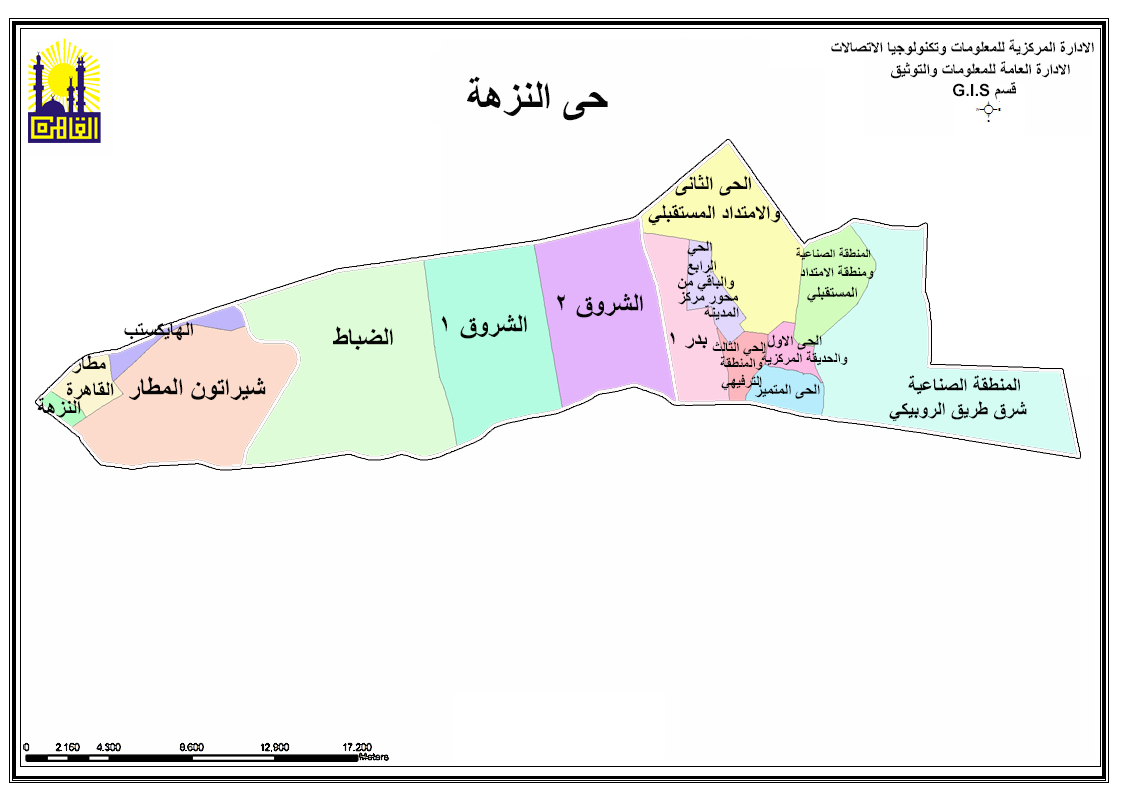
Administrative map of el-Nozha district, Cairo, Egypt (in Arabic)

== Religious buildings ==
There are a number of places of worship in the district for all three Abrahamic religions and many of their sects, reflecting the cosmopolitan intent of the early 20th-century colonial real estate project. Our Lady of Heliopolis Co-Cathedral is a Roman Catholic church on Al-Ahram Street and a famous landmark, and the burial place of Heliopolis' founder Baron Empain. Since 1951, Heliopolis was the seat of the Latin Catholic Apostolic Vicariate of Heliopolis (founded as Apostolic Prefecture of the Nile Delta) until its title was merged in 1987 into the Apostolic Vicariate of Alexandria of Egypt. Its Marian former Our Lady cathedral remains a Co-cathedral. Other churches include the Saint Mark Coptic Orthodox Church, the Saint George Coptic Orthodox Church, the Saint-Rita Maronite Church, Theotokos Greek Orthodox Church, Sainte Therese Armenian Catholic Church.

There is also the Vitali Madjar Synagogue on al-Masallah Street. A large number of mosques now populate Heliopolis, though initially there was only one, the Mosque on Midan al-Game' next to the 'native quarter' where the workers originally lived.

== Recreational facilities ==
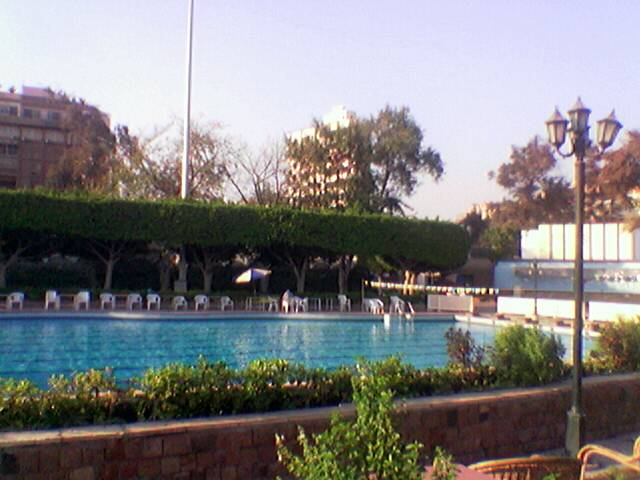
Heliopolis Sporting Club in 2007

Heliopolis contains recreational places, as it was initially established to offer its residents and visitors rest and relaxation. Heliopolis Club is one of the most luxurious sporting clubs in Egypt. It was established along with Heliopolis in 1905. From 1911 until 1915, Heliopolis had Luna Park, Africa's first amusement park (the grounds were converted into an Australian field hospital just after the onset of World War I).

The Merryland is also a famous recreational park; it contains a lake and was at the height of its elegance in the 1960s and 70s. It now contains a small amusement park. Other sporting clubs include El Shams Club (biggest in size and number of members), Heliolido Club, El-Ghaba Club, El-Tayaran Club and others.

Heliopolis contains modern cafes and restaurants along with some Egyptian traditional ones. Some bars and nightclubs can be found. Tens of cinemas can be found in Heliopolis and its extension, Madinet Nasr (Nasr City); Normandy Cinema in Al-Ahram Street, Cinema Roxy, Cinema Heliopolis along with the new cinemas in Horia Mall and Citystars Shopping Mall, one of the largest malls in Egypt and the Middle East.

=== Korba ===
The triangular El-Korba Square on Baghdad Street and the area surrounding it, popularly known as Korba, is one of the city's favorite public spaces and home to historic landmarks like the Baron Empain Palace (Alexander Marcel) and Boghos Nubar Pasha Palace. Originally it was named "Le Courbet" French: the bow. It also houses the Basilica, the Korba Church and Heliopolis Hotel (now presidential palace). It is a popular area for strolling, shopping, cafes and restaurants.

== Political importance ==
Heliopolis gained a special political and military importance in Egypt and the Middle East in recent decades. The Egyptian Military headquarters and the Egyptian Air Force headquarters are there. The Almaza Military Airbase is very close to Heliopolis. Heliopolis was the residence of the Egyptian ex-president Hosni Mubarak. In 1981, the site of Heliopolis Palace Hotel became the Egyptian Republican Palace (Arabic: قصر رئاسة الجمهورية) and the president's office. It is also where the headquarters of the Nation's Future Party, the current major political party of Egypt, is located.

== Modern development ==
In contrast with its initial establishment as a quiet suburb, Heliopolis now is considered a main part of Cairo. It is home to celebrities, football players, politicians and wealthy families. The number of residents has doubled several times since 1922. A tram system used to serve Heliopolis and parts of the surrounding area but it has been closed and removed entirely since 2015. By that time, Heliopolis was being integrated into the Cairo underground metro's Line 3, which now links it to Greater Cairo's eastern satellite cities, and to its western extension in Giza, through Abassia, Downtown and Zamalek. Local Heliopolis stations are Koleyet El Banat, Al Ahram, Haroun, Heliopolis Square, Alf Maskan, El-Shams Club, and El-Nozha. The Heliopolis extension of Line 3 was completed in 2018.

In 2019 and 2020, major changes to the infrastructure have occurred including widening several streets and building several bridges to ease traffic (mainly instead of major squares). This is also part of a bigger plan to link the New Administrative Capital in the east to the city of Cairo.

== Education ==
International schools:

- Lycée La Liberté Héliopolis
- Saint Fatima School

== See also ==
- Cairo Electric Railways and Heliopolis Oases Company
- Ancient Heliopolis
- Heliopolis style: the architectural style of Heliopolis
- New Heliopolis (suburb)
