= Our Lady of Heliopolis Co-Cathedral =

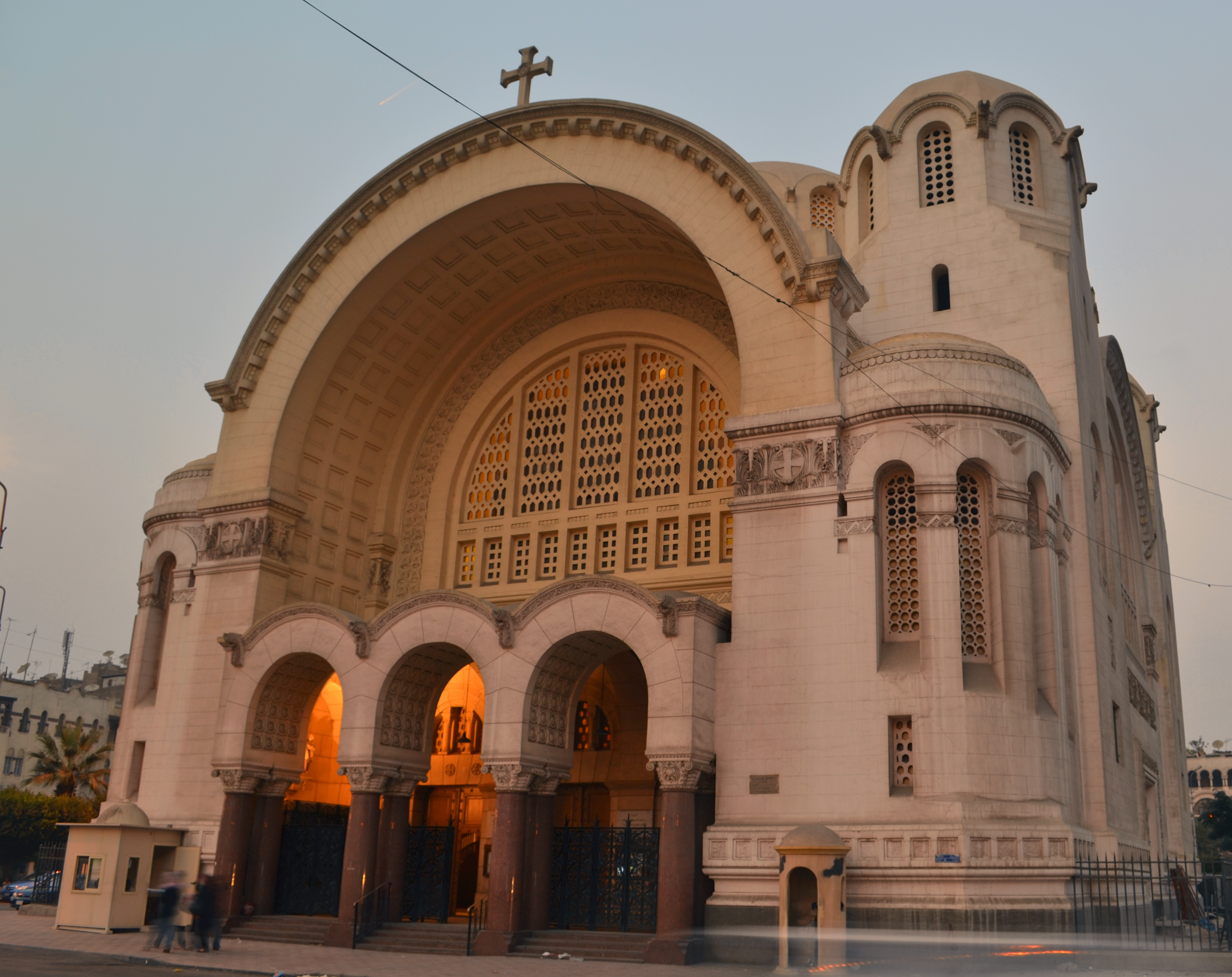

Religion
- Affiliation: Roman Catholic
- Rite: Roman
- Patron: Mary, mother of Jesus

Location
- Location: Heliopolis, Cairo
- Country: Egypt
- Interactive map of Our Lady of Heliopolis Co-Cathedral
- Coordinates: 30.0936°N 31.3252°E

Architecture
- Architect: Alexandre Marcel
- Style: Byzantine Revival
- Funded by: Édouard Empain
- Groundbreaking: 1911
- Completed: 1913
- Direction of façade: Southwest

Website
- www.labasilique.org

Our Lady of Heliopolis Co-Cathedral, also known as the Latin Cathedral of Our Lady of Heliopolis, or the Basilica of the Holy Virgin, is a Roman Catholic church building, located on Al-Ahram Square in the Heliopolis neighbourhood of Cairo, Egypt.

Alexandre Marcel designed the cathedral in a Byzantine Revival style, based on the Hagia Sophia. It was completed in 1913. A crypt within the cathedral houses the remains of its financer, Édouard Empain, and his family.

A co-cathedral since 2008, it follows the Roman Rite under the jurisdiction of the Apostolic Vicariate of Alexandria of Egypt (Vicariatus Apostolicus Alexandrinus). In 2014 members of various Christian denominations gathered at the site to pray for the country's future after the events in the Arab spring.

The back of the Cathedral under renovation in 2025

== See also ==
- Roman Catholicism in Egypt
