= Sultana Malak Palace =

Coordinates: 30.0887°N 31.3292°E

- قصر السلطانة ملك
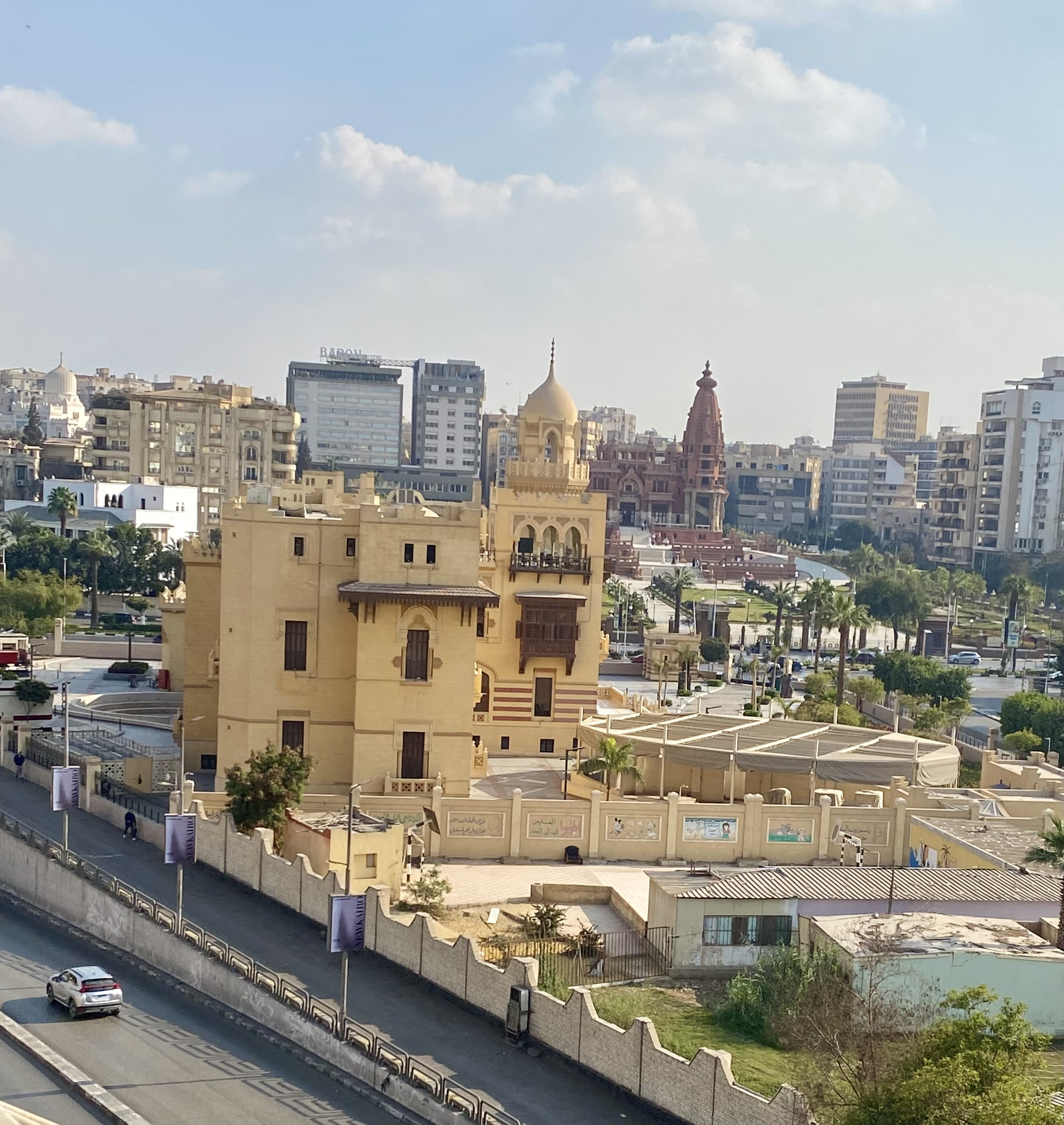

General information
- Location: Orouba Street, Heliopolis Suburb, Cairo, Egypt
- Owner: Supreme Council of Antiquities

Design and construction
- Architect(s): Alexander Marcel

Sultana Malak's Palace (Arabic: قصر السلطانة ملك) is a palace located in the Heliopolis Suburb of Cairo.

== History ==
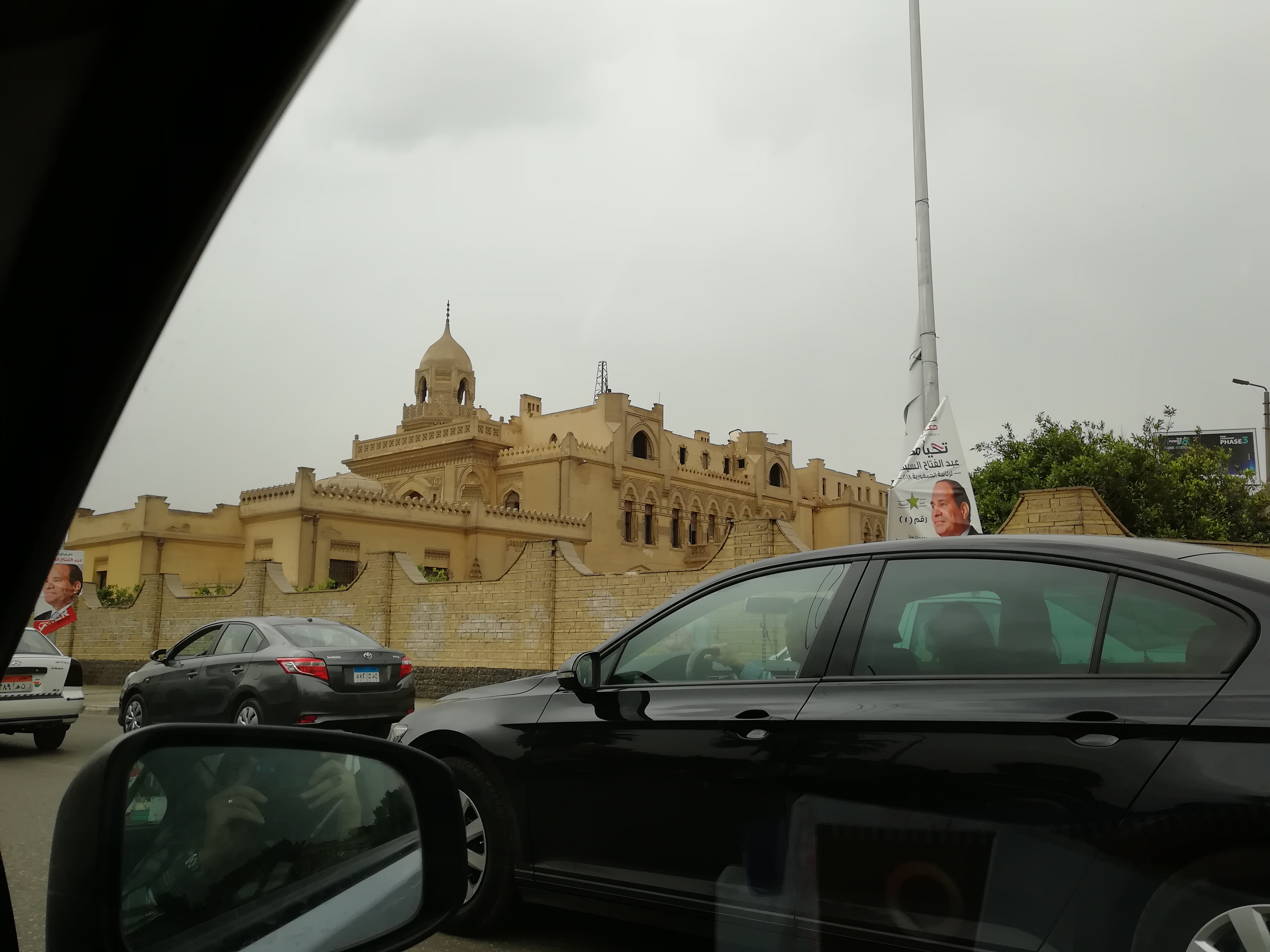

This palace was designed by the Belgian engineer Édouard Empain to give it to Sultan Hussein Kamel, but he refused to take the palace as a gift and insisted on buying it, but he died before paying for it.

The ownership of the Palace passed to the New Egypt Housing and Construction Company, which established an agreement with Sultana Malak, second wife of Sultan Hussein Kamel, in which the company would lease the palace to her until 1960, where the palace would become a school.

In 2000, the palace was registered as an archaeological building within the Islamic and Coptic monuments.
