= Robidas =

Robidas is a French-language surname. Notable people with the surname include:

- Marcel Robidas (1923–2009), Canadian politician
- Stéphane Robidas (born 1977), Canadian ice hockey defenceman

== See also ==
- Robida
