= Cairo Electric Railways and Heliopolis Oases Company =

Real estate company in Egypt

Heliopolis Company for Housing and Development SAE
- Formerly: Cairo Electric Railways & Heliopolis Oases Company
- Company type: Publicly listed company
- Traded as: HELI.CA
- Industry: Real estate development
- Founded: February 2, 1906
- Founder: Édouard Empain; Boghos Nubar Pasha and 22 other individuals and companies
- Headquarters: Egypt
- Key people: Mohamed El Shahwy (Chairman of the Board)
- Services: Till December 31, 1991: Heliopolis’ tram management. Utilities management for Heliopolis. (ie: water, power, roads...)
- Owner: Holding Company for Construction and Development (72%)
- Number of employees: 933
- Website: HeliopolisCompany.com

The Cairo Electric Railways & Heliopolis Oases Company (Arabic: شركة سكك حديد مصر الكهربائية و واحات عين شمس) was formed in Cairo, Egypt in 1906 to develop a 25 square kilometer plot of land into the Heliopolis suburb. It was nationalised in 1960, and remained a state-owned enterprise until it was listed on the Cairo and Alexandria Stock Exchange (now the Egyptian Exchange, or EGX) in 1995 and renamed the Heliopolis Company for Housing and Development (Arabic: شركة مصر الجديدة للإسكان و التعمير).

== History ==
On May 20, 1905, the Egyptian government signed a concession to develop a large desert plot of 25 square kilometres north-east of Cairo, with Belgian industrialist Édouard Empain and Boghos Nubar Pasha, son of the former Egyptian Prime Minister Nubar Pasha.

The Cairo Electric Railways and Heliopolis Oases Company itself was established by the two entrepreneurs and 22 other investors and companies on February 14, 1906 as a property development company to build the Heliopolis Oasis near where the ancient city of Heliopolis once stood.

The new suburb was planned with rail and tramway links to the centre of Cairo, and consisted of plots for villas, Heliopolis style apartment blocks, workers' housing, the Heliopolis Palace Hotel (converted later into a presidential palace), restaurants, shops, churches, mosques, a synagogue, and hospitals.

In 1955, the company was instructed by the government according to Law 123/1955, to prepare 1,500 400m^{2} plots of land in five new neighbourhoods on its desert concession to be sold at LE1.45 per square meter primarily to government employees or members of housing cooperatives approved by the Cairo municipality.

The post-independence socialist government of Gamal Abdel Nasser nationalised the company in 1961, turning it into the public Masr al-Gadida Suburb Organisation (Arabic: مؤسسة ضاحية مصر الجديدة) and affiliated to the Ministry of Municipal and Village Affairs, taking on the real estate development business. By 1964 the company was renamed as the Heliopolis Company for Housing and Development (Arabic: شركة مصر الجديدة للإسكان و التعمير).

As part of the International Monetary Fund and World Bank's Economic Reform and Structural Adjustment Programme, or ERSAP, the company was part of a privatisation programme and was listed in 1996 on the Egyptian Exchange and has the Reuters code of HELI.CA. As of 2021, the government of Egypt was still the majority shareholder, with its Holding Company for Construction and Development owning 72% of the company, while the second-largest shareholder by far was the government of Norway, whose Norges Bank owned 1.19%.

== Heliopolis Palace Hotel ==
=== History ===
On September 23, 1905, the world celebrated the official date of this new hotel. Conceived by Belgian architect Ernest Jaspar, his birth boasted 400 shows including 55 private shows.
Its banquet halls were amongst the biggest anywhere. The utilities were the state of the art technology of the time. All had been constructed and put together by the contracting firms Leon Rolin & Co. and Padova, Dentamaro & Ferro, the biggest two civil contractors in Egypt. Siemens-Schuckert of Berlin fitted the hotel's web of electric cables and installations.

=== Design ===
As though intentional, its severe, almost forbidding exterior contrasted sharply with the extravagance of the interior. A 1912 visitor recounts: "Beyond the reception offices are two lavishly decorated rooms, in the Louis XIV and Louis XV styles respectively and then comes the central hall, which is a dream of beauty and symmetry. Here the architecture, which is responsible for so many wonderful effects in Heliopolis, reaches its artistic zenith. Damascus-made Oriental lamps hung from every corner and cranny hang."
King Albert I (King of Belgium), who stayed in the hotel with his wife Queen Elisabeth for a month, said "C'est une merveille!" upon entering the main hall.
The main hall, which was almost 589 meters^{2}, had a 55-meter-wide dome, designed by Alexander Marcel of the French Institute and decorated by Georges Claude, was carpeted with the finest oriental rugs and fitted with large floor-to-ceiling mirrors, draperies and a large marble fireplace. Twenty-two Italian marble columns connected the parquet to the ceiling. To one side of the hall there was the dining room, which seated 150 guests, and to the other was the billiard hall with two full-sized Thurston tables, as well as a priceless French one. The hotel's mahogany furniture were supplied by Maple's Furniture (London).
The hotel's area was so large, that a railway system was installed, running through the hotel; passing by offices, kitchens, refrigerators, storerooms and the staff housing.

=== World Wars and after ===
During World War I and II, the hotel was transformed into a military hospital for British soldiers.
After World War II, air travel reduced the average tourist stay to a few days. As tourism became a mega-industry, massive hotels emerged in Egypt with interiors calculated on the basis of return per square meter. Unable to compete, the hotel became less popular.

=== Becoming a Presidential palace ===
In the 1980s, which marks the beginning of the Mubarak regime, the Heliopolis Palace Hotel was declared the headquarters of the new presidential administration, after becoming the location of various government departments for over 10 years.

== Heliopark plot ==
In October 2003, a presidential decree allocated the Heliopolis Company for Housing and Development a 1,695-acre (6.86 km^{2}) plot of land in the satellite city of New Cairo, as a compensation for the land that was taken to build the Cairo International Airport. In 2021, and agreement was made for its development as the Heliopark project.
