= Camille Robida =

French architect (1880–1938)

- Born: 7 March 1880; Paris, France
- Died: 10 January 1938 (aged 57); Passy, Haute-Savoie, France
- Education: École nationale supérieure des Beaux-Arts
- Occupation: Architect
- Buildings: Stade Marcel-Saupin
- Projects: Héliopolis

Jules Edmond Camille Robida (7 March 1880 – 10 January 1938) was a French architect and urban planner.

== Biography ==
The son of science-fiction illustrator Albert Robida, he graduated from the École nationale supérieure des Beaux-Arts and was originally based in Le Vésinet near Paris. Under the creative direction of his father, Robida designed the Old Paris quarter for the 1900 World's Fair, which received mixed reviews. Another early work is Coulommiers' Art Nouveau theatre (1904), which has been registered as a monument historique, albeit largely for its well-preserved stage machinery.

In 1907, he was hired by Baron Empain to build a casino—which morphed into a building for an adjacent horse racing track—in his Egyptian new city, Héliopolis. He soon graduated to the position of chief architect for the entire project, designing residences for a wide variety of demographics ranging from blue collar workers to high ranking government officials. He stayed with the venture until 1912.

Robida spent most of his later career in Nantes. He co-authored the city's 1920 expansion plan, and his awareness of urban industrial risks has been described as ahead of its time. He designed Stade Marcel-Saupin, the former home of FC Nantes, and many housing buildings of the era. His successor as Nantes' principal urbanist, Georges Sébille, was also a former Héliopolis employee.

Robida fought in World War I, and had his left leg amputated in September 1914. His younger brother Henry, who had just been appointed consulting architect to the government of Siam, was killed in action the same month. The elder Robida received the Médaille militaire and the Croix de Guerre, and was a prominent member of several veterans' groups. As the city's architect, he drew downtown Nantes' World War I memorial and lobbied for a second monument to disabled veteran Louis Schloessinger in the north of the city, which was partially destroyed during World War II. For his advocacy work, he was made an Officier of the Légion d'honneur.

Robida died of tuberculosis in Passy, Haute-Savoie, which at the time housed one of France's largest sanatoriums.

== Selected works ==
- Old Paris quarter at 1900 World's Fair
- Héliopolis, Egypt
- Stade Marcel-Saupin, Nantes
