= Stade Marcel-Saupin =

Football stadium in Nantes, France

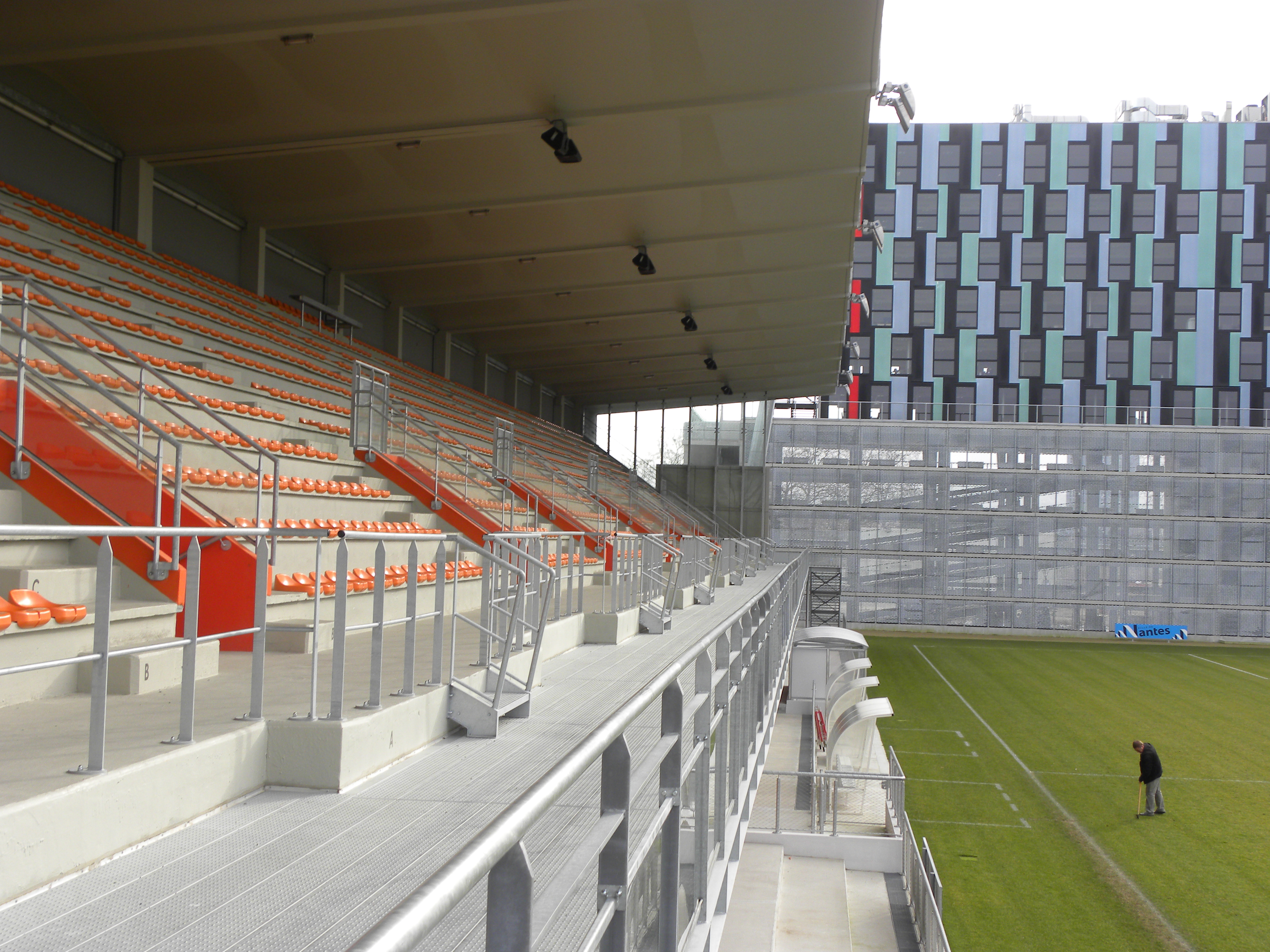
- Interactive map of Stade Marcel-Saupin
- Former names: Stade Malakoff (1937–1965)
- Location: 31 quai Malakoff; 44000 Nantes
- Coordinates: 47°12′45″N 1°32′18″W
- Owner: Ville de Nantes
- Capacity: 20,000 (1955); 33,000 (1969); 1,880 (2010)
- Surface: grass

Construction
- Opened: 1937
- Renovated: 2006–2009
- Architect: Camille Robida

Tenants
- FC Nantes B FC Nantes (women); FC Nantes

The Stade Marcel-Saupin is a sports complex in the city of Nantes (Loire-Atlantique), France. It was opened in 1937 under the name Stade Malakoff, and was used primarily by Stade nantais université club for rugby union, then became the stadium of FC Nantes after World War II until the club moved to the Stade de la Beaujoire in 1984.

== History ==
At first, the stadium did not have lights for night matches; these were not installed until 1957. There was room for 14,000 spectators, but there were only 1,200 seats. When FC Nantes was promoted to Ligue 1, the stadium was renovated and enlarged for 25,000 spectators. In May 1965, it was renamed Marcel-Saupin, after the recently deceased president and founding member of FC Nantes, despite his links to collaborators during World War II. The unfavourable location of the stadium, wedged between the Loire and the urban centre, limited its expansion to 29,500 spectators in the 1970s, despite the increasing popularity of the club.

For more than twenty years, "Saupin" was one of the most renowned stadiums of French football, following the success of FC Nantes. Events such as the fireworks of Philippe Gondet and Jacky Simon to the championship matches between Nantes and AS Saint-Étienne, matches with the club's Atlantic rivals Girondins de Bordeaux, it was there the Canaries wrote the most important chapters of their history with six French championship titles, their first Coupe de France, and a European semi-final in 1980. The France national team also played there many times in the early 1970s before their resurgence in popularly forced them to play most of their matches at the Parc des Princes in Paris.

After a final title in 1983, FC Nantes said goodbye to Saupin on April 28, 1984, after which they moved to the Beaujoire, a modern stadium constructed for the 1984 European championship, hosted by France. Saupin became the stadium of the Nantes reserve team.

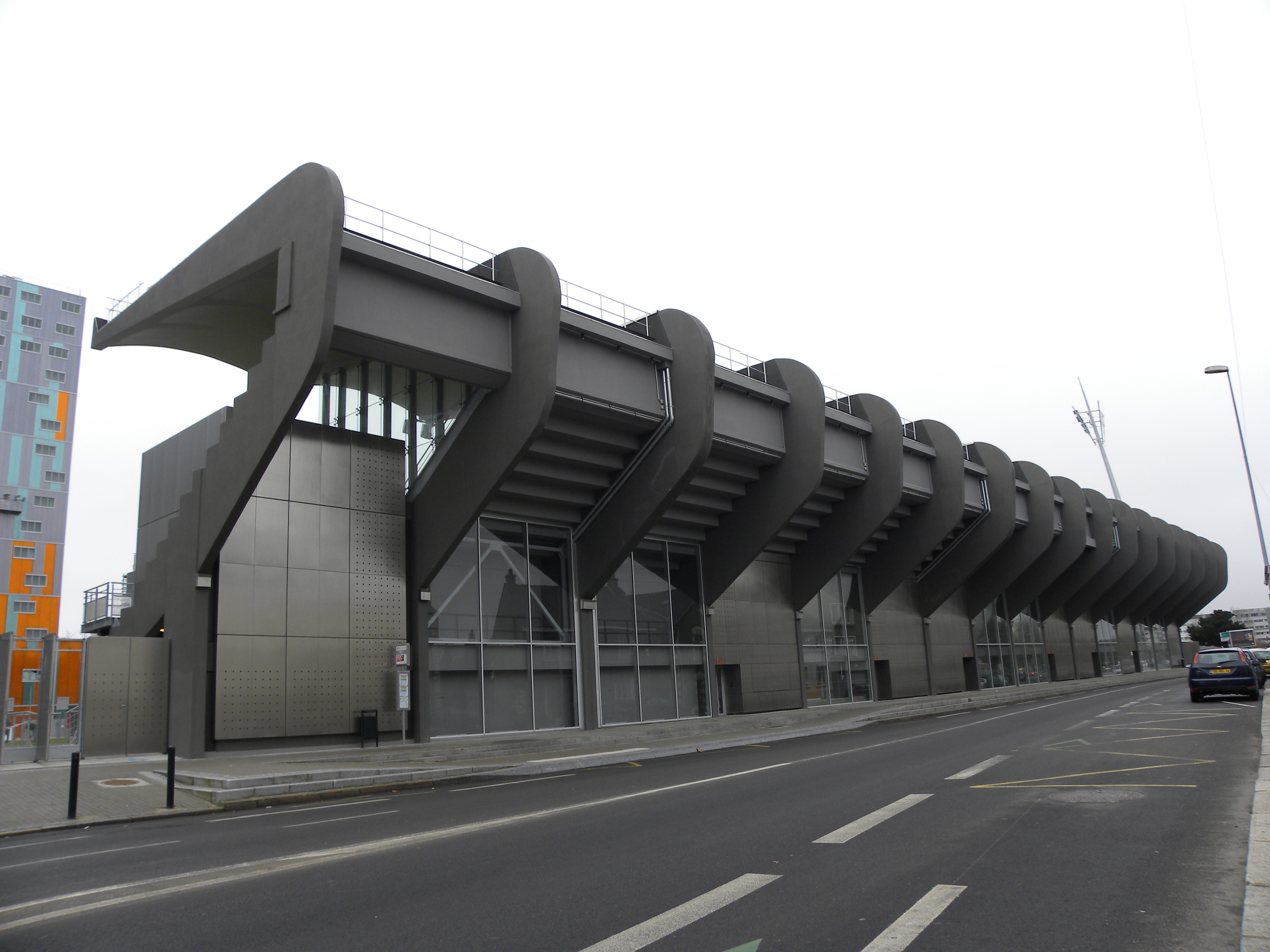
Exterior view of the rebuilt north stands.

As part of an urban renewal project led by the Parisian architect Philippe Gazeau, the stadium was largely demolished in August 2006. Only the north stands, which are now named after Oscar Muller, and the field were preserved so that the reserve team would still be able to play there. The rest of the site houses the Maison des sciences de l'homme and the Institut d'études advancées of the University of Nantes, a hotel-residence, and corporate offices.

On 10 October 2009, Nantes hosted FC Blois in a CFA2 match, the first game in the new Stade Marcel-Saupin. Nantes defeated Blois 1-0 in front of 760 spectators.

== Concerts ==
In 1984, Bob Dylan, Joan Baez, and Carlos Santana played a festival at the stadium.
