= Chemins de fer de la Basse-Egypte =

Coordinates: 31.016088°N 31.393039°E

Chemins de Fer de la Basse-Egypte
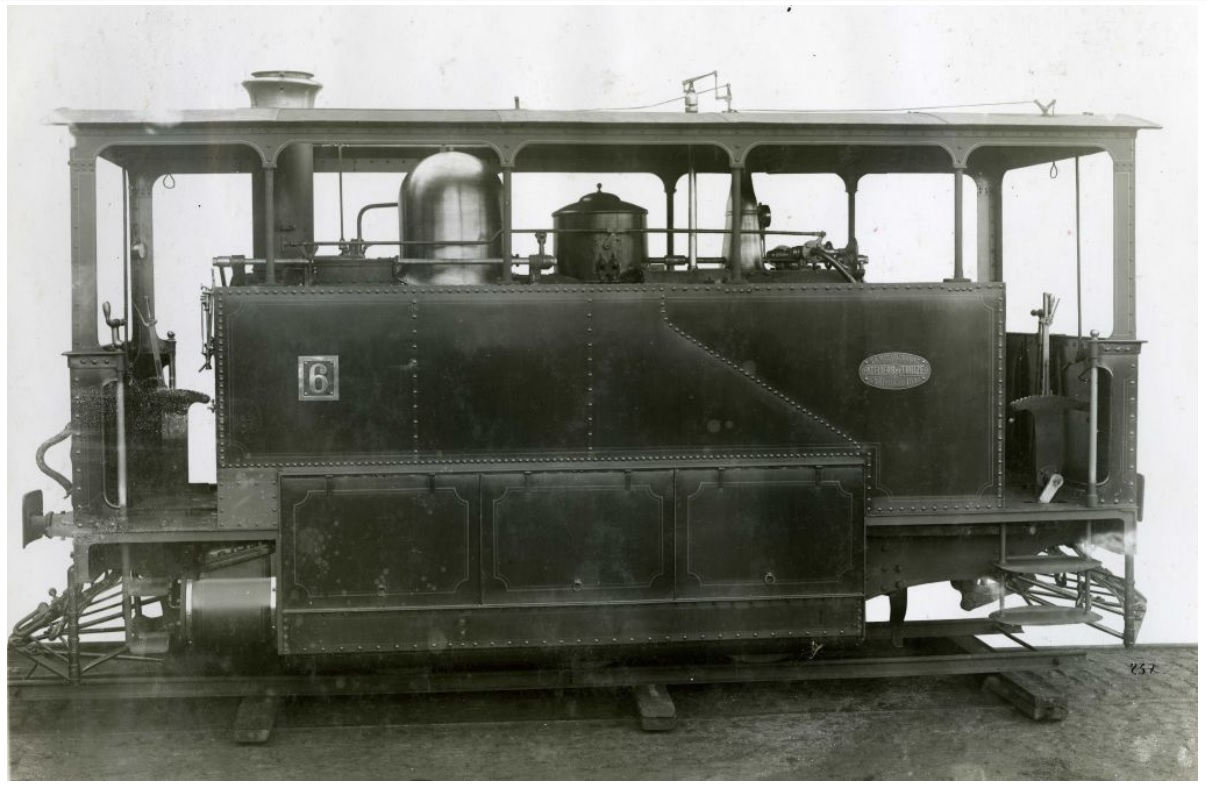
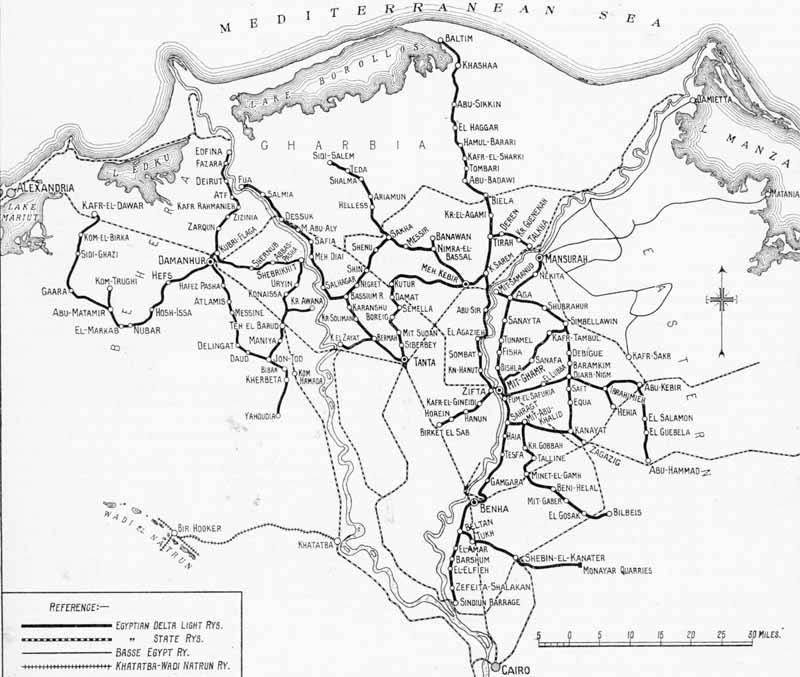
- Steam locomotive No 6 (Tubize's serial No 1067 of 1896) Map of the railway lines

Technical
- Track gauge: 1,000 mm (3 ft 3 3/8 in)

The Chemins de fer de la Basse-Egypte built and operated a network of up to seven lines of metre-gauge (1,000 mm, 3 ft 3 3/8 in) railway track in the area around Mansourah in Egypt.

== History ==
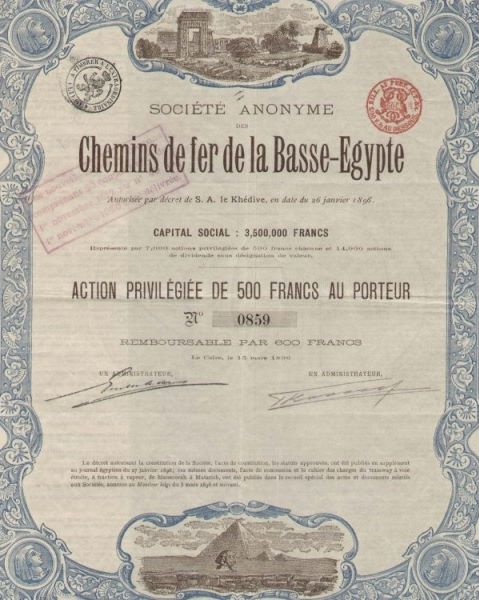
Stock certificate of 1896

The Chemins de Fer de la Basse-Egypte were founded on 26 January 1896 by the Belgian baron Édouard Empain (born 1852; died 1929) as a PLC.

The construction of the railway line was managed by the Belgian engineer Jean Jadot (1862–1932). The main line connected Mansourah (on the Nile river) to Matarieh (on the far side of Lake Manzala from Port Said).

The turnover increased from £E 26,199 in 1904, over £E 29,872 in £1905, E 32,122 in 1906 to £E 36,740 in 1907. Subsequently, it decreased to £E 35,760 in 1908 and £E 35,184 in 1909.

In 1936, the company owned 22 locomotives, 94 coaches and 367 goods wagons.
