= Lycée La Liberté Héliopolis =

- ليسيه الحرية بمصر الجديدة
- 2011 Logo

Location
- 82 Al Orouba Street; Heliopolis; Cairo; Egypt; 30.097576°N 31.343801°E

Information
- Established: 1936
- Grades: kinder garden to secondary
- Language: French, Arabic
- Campus size: 8 acres
- Nickname: L.L.H.

Lycée Al Horreya Héliopolis (Arabic: ليسيه الحرية مصر الجديدة), also known as Lycée la Liberté d'Héliopolis, is a French-language school in Heliopolis, Cairo, Egypt.

== History ==
Lycée La Liberté D'Héliopolis opened in 1937 by the Mission Laïque Française.

== Curriculum ==
An English language section has been added to all school sections.

== See also ==
- Lycée Al-Horreya, Alexandria
