= Édouard Empain =

Walloon Belgian engineer, entrepreneur, financier, industrialist and Egyptologist

The High Well-born The Baron Empain
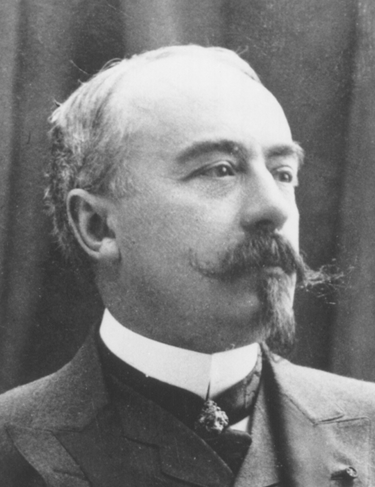
- Born: Édouard Louis Joseph Empain; 20 September 1852; Belœil, Belgium
- Died: 22 July 1929 (aged 76); Woluwe, Belgium
- Occupations: Industrialist, General and amateur Egyptologist
- Known for: Building Paris Métro and town of Heliopolis

Édouard Louis Joseph, 1st Baron Empain (20 September 1852 – 22 July 1929), was a wealthy Walloon Belgian engineer, entrepreneur, financier and industrialist, as well as an amateur Egyptologist. During World War I he became a known major general. His major claims to fame are being the original winner of the contract to build the Paris Metro, and developing the town of Heliopolis in Cairo.

== Early life ==
Empain was born at Belœil, Belgium, and was the son of schoolteacher François Julien Empain and his wife Catherine (née Lolivier). He went into business with his brother, Baron François Empain and other family members, and amassed a great fortune.

Empain began his career a draughtsman at a metallurgical company, Société métallurgique, in 1878, and became involved in railway construction when he noticed that transport infrastructure in the countryside was inadequate. After success in Belgium with the Liège-Jemeppe line, his companies developed several railway lines in France, including the creation of the Paris Métro.

Because he felt that he depended too much on the banks for his industrial plans, in 1881 he founded his own bank, Banque Empain (which in 1919 would be renamed the Banque Industrielle Belge). The Empain group of companies expanded greatly throughout the 1890s, constructing electric urban tramlines in Europe as well as railways in Russia, China, the Belgian Congo, and in Cairo, Egypt. Desiring to also be independent of electricity producers, Empain also was involved in forming a number of electricity companies to power his projects. In 1901, Empain became a close friend of the then-ruling King Leopold II, who was the sole owner of the Congo Free State. Empain created a railway network in the Congo, based out of Stanleyville.

== Egypt ==
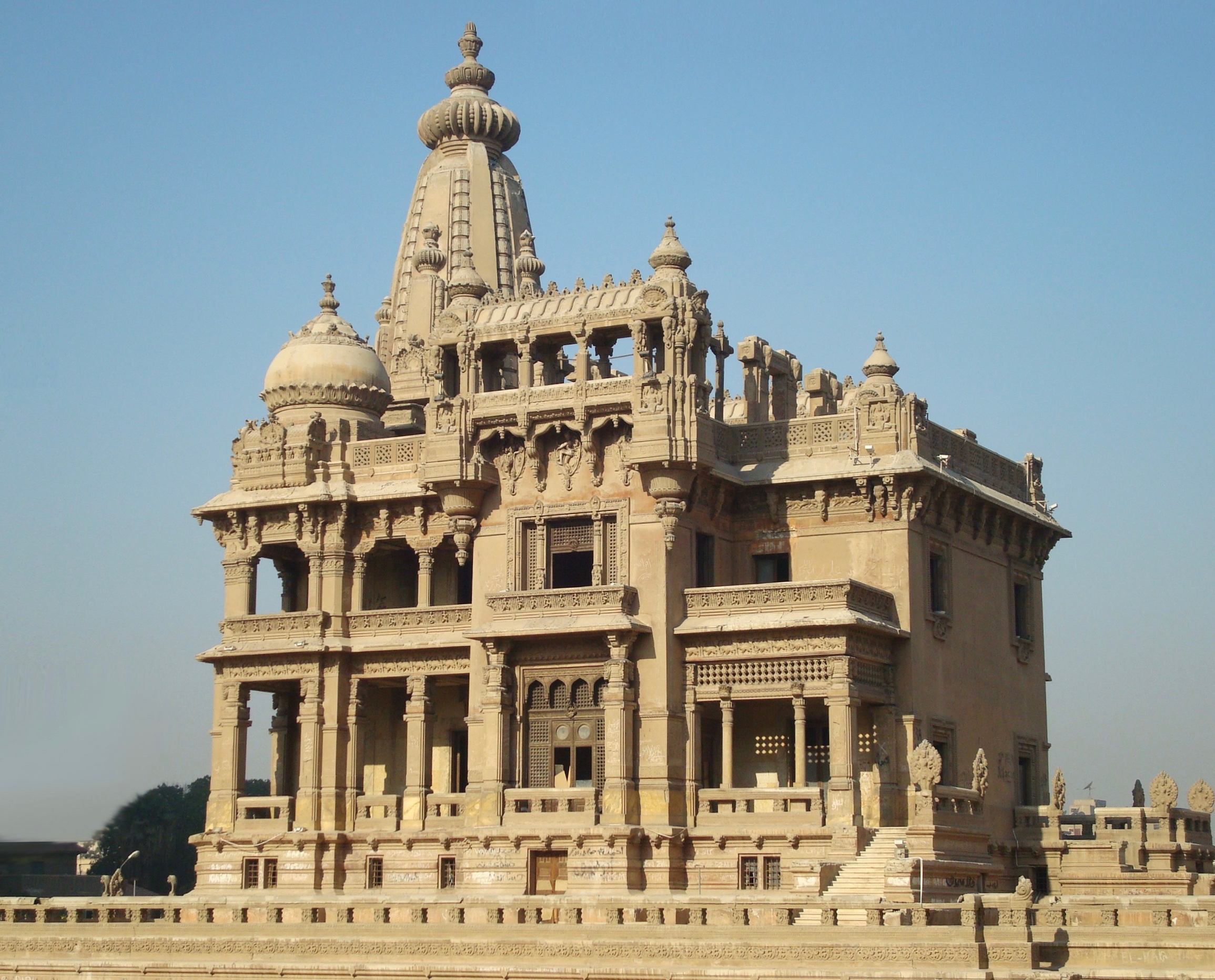
Baron Empain Palace (Qasr Al Baron), Heliopolis, Egypt.

Édouard Empain arrived in Egypt in January 1904, intending to rescue one of the projects of his company S.A. des Chemins de Fer de la Basse-Egypte; being the construction of a railway line linking Mansourah (on the Nile river) to Matariya (on the far side of Lake Manzala from Port Said).

In 1906, Empain established the Cairo Electric Railways and Heliopolis Oases Company, which bought a very large stretch of desert (25 square kilometres) to the northeast of Cairo at a low price from the Egyptian government. Commencing in 1906 this company proceeded with the building of the new town of Heliopolis, in the desert, ten kilometres from the center of Cairo. It was designed as a "city of luxury and leisure", with broad avenues and equipped with all necessary conveniences and infrastructure; water, drains, electricity, hotel facilities, such as the Heliopolis Palace Hotel (formerly the presidential palace of ex-President Hosni Mubarak) and Heliopolis House, and recreational amenities including a golf course, racetrack and park. In addition, there was housing for rent, offered in a range of innovative design types targeting specific social classes with detached and terraced villas, apartment buildings, tenement blocks with balcony access and workers' bungalows.

Today, Baron Empain is perhaps best known by modern visitors to Egypt for the building of a palace (the Palais Hindou) in the Avenue des Palais (renamed Orouba Avenue following the Egyptian Revolution of 1952) Heliopolis, Egypt. The Baron Empain palace was designed by French architect Alexandre Marcel (1860–1928) and decorated by Georges-Louis Claude (1879–1963), with construction being completed in 1911.

In 1905, Empain assisted the Belgian government in the purchase of an Old Kingdom mastaba for the royal museum in Brussels, of which he was a benefactor. In 1907 he received the title of Baron, and also suggested to Belgian Egyptologist Jean Capart that he excavate at Heliopolis, where his building constructions were underway. He also made it possible for Capart to acquire some fine ancient artefacts for the Brussels Museum.

== Military career ==
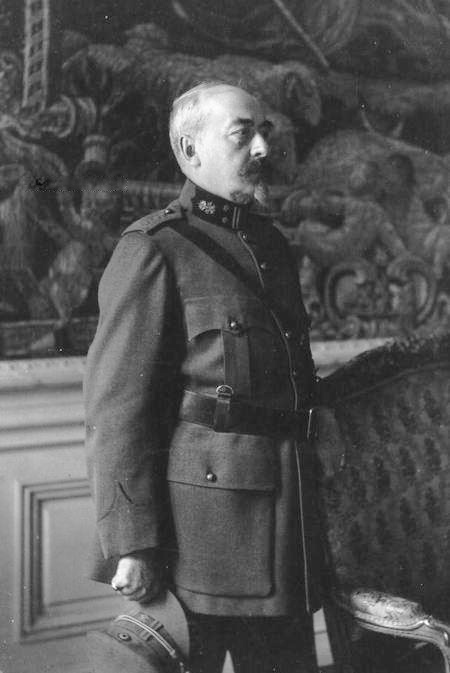
Major-General Baron Empain

During World War I, he was given the rank of general and directed armaments production at Paris and Le Havre for the Belgian army.

He died in Woluwe, Belgium, and was buried in Our Lady of Heliopolis Basilica (Basilique Notre-Dame d'Héliopolis). In Egypt.

He was succeeded as baron by his son, Jean Empain, who married American burlesque performer Rozell Rowland (sometimes Rozelle Rowland). They entertained frequently at the Heliopolis. Jean, 2nd Baron Empain, was succeeded by their son, Édouard-Jean Empain.

== Honours ==
- Kingdom of Belgium:
  - Honorary Aide-de-camp of the HM the King.
  - War Cross
  - Grand Officer in the Order of Leopold.
- Kingdom of Egypt: Knight grand Cross of the Order of the Nile.
- Kingdom of Spain: Knight grand Cross of the Order of Isabella the Catholic
- United Kingdom: Companion of the Most Honourable Military Order of the Bath.
- France: Commander of the Legion of Honour.

== See also ==
- The town of Kindu in the Belgian Congo was known as Port Empain.
- Heliopolis Oasis Company
- Heliopolis
