= Heliopolis style =

Egyptian architecture

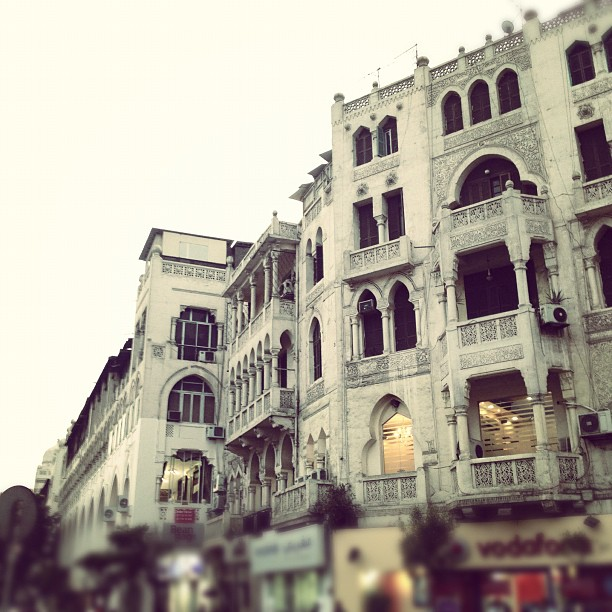
Heliopolis Style Building in Korba, Heliopolis

Heliopolis style is an early 20th-century architectural style developed in the new suburb of Heliopolis in eastern Cairo, Egypt. The Belgian Cairo Electric Railways and Heliopolis Oases Company, responsible for planning and developing the new suburb, created the new style to implement an exclusive distinctiveness to the design of its buildings. This revivalist style is a synthesis of Medieval Egyptian Revival, Moorish Revival, Persian Revival, and European Neoclassical architecture styles.

== Style ==
The goal of this style was to successfully implement the aesthetic and functional advantages of the influencing styles. Combining the qualities of these types brought Moorish and Persian facades, Egyptian spatial volumes and ornaments, and European floor plans, and Neoclassical and Moorish interiors together in a homogeneous unit.

The Heliopolis style integrated qualities, including:

- climatic adaptation techniques of northern Africa (implemented in volumes).
- Persian-Moorish Revival sense of architectural style detailing (implemented in facades).
- Euro-Egyptian hospitality social traditions, of the early 20th century era (implemented in plans and interior design).

== Examples ==
The only examples of this unique architectural style are found in the suburb of Heliopolis, where they are still very well preserved. The Heliopolis style is represented there by a large ensemble of buildings in a wide area with the historic form-language. The Heliopolis Palace, originally a grand hotel opened in 1910 and now a presidential palace, is an exceptional example.

Architects practicing at the time in this style included Charles Ayrout and Henry Habib Ayrout.

== See also ==
- Egyptian Revival architecture
- Timeline of architectural styles
