= Alexandre Marcel =

French architect

- Born: 11 September 1860; Paris
- Died: 30 June 1928 (aged 67)
- Occupation: Architect

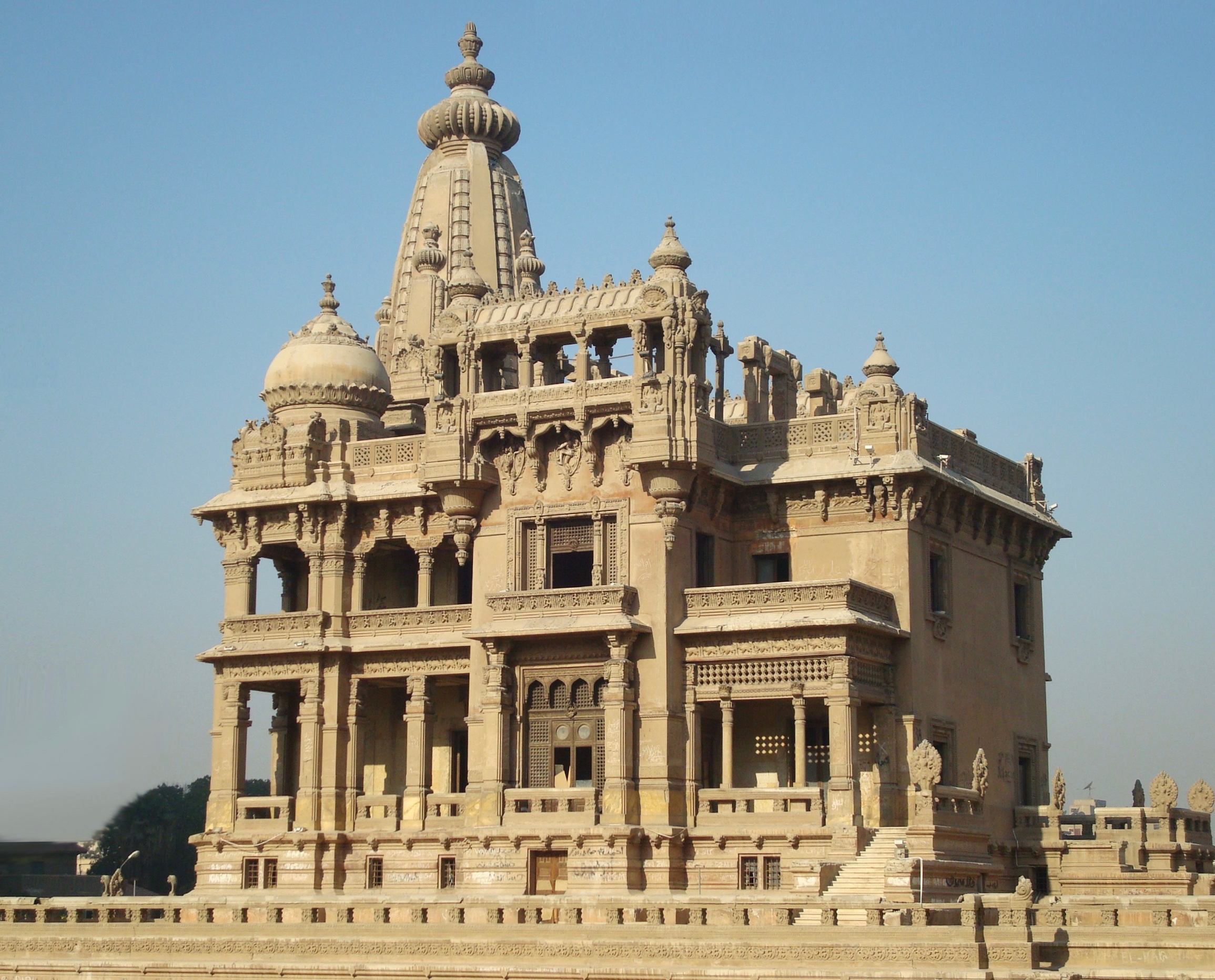
Baron Empain Palace, Cairo

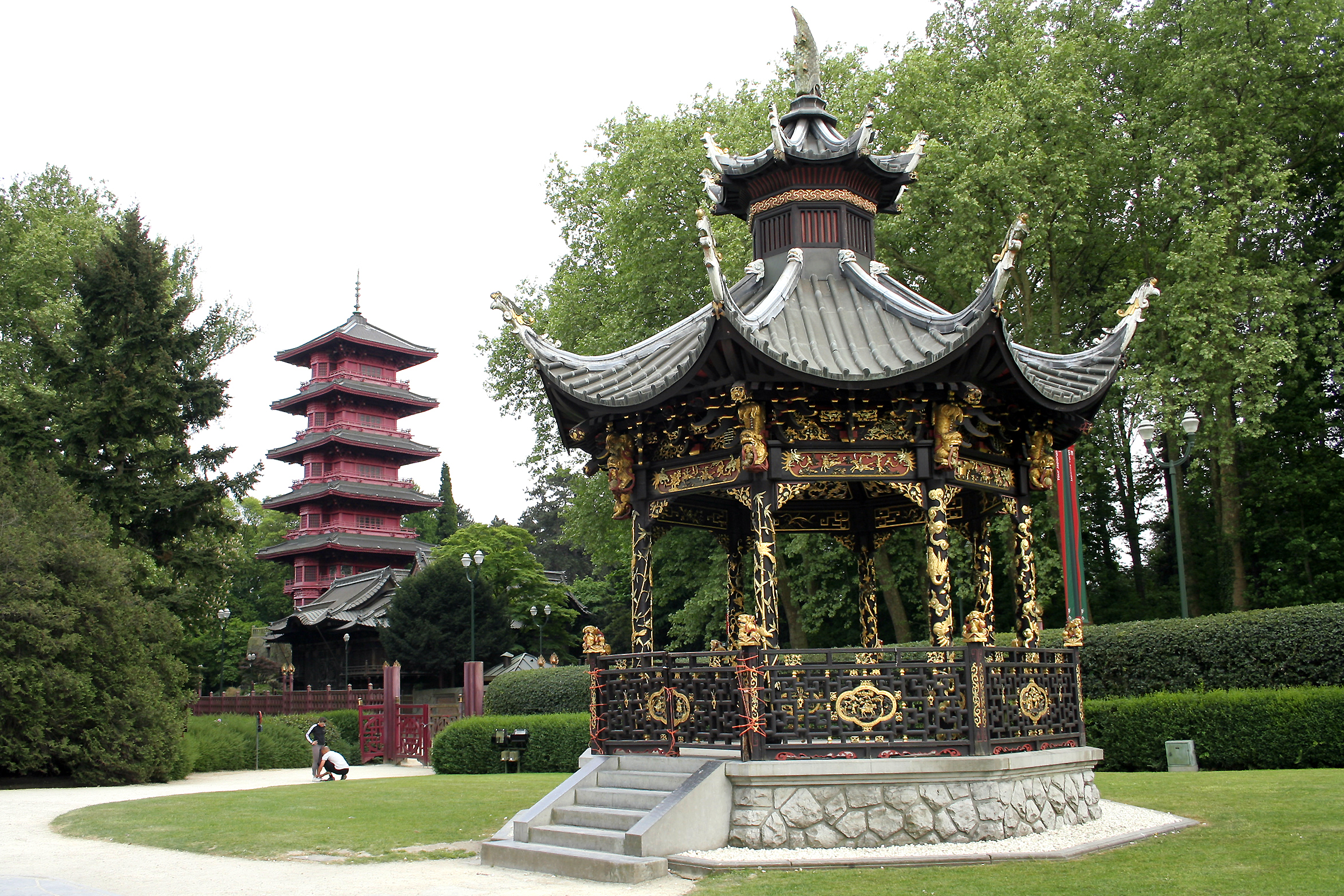
Japanese Tower and the kiosk of the Chinese Pavilion, Laeken, Brussels

Alexandre Marcel (11 September 1860 - 30 June 1928) was a French architect, best known for his Belle Époque interpretations of "exotic" international architectural styles.

Marcel studied at the Parisian École des Beaux-Arts in the atelier of Louis-Jules André.

== Works ==
His work includes:

- the Pagoda Cinema, on the Rue de Babylon, Paris, 1896
- multiple buildings for the Paris Exposition of 1900, including the Cambodian Pavilion and the Panorama du Tour du Monde of the sea-transport company Compagnie des messageries maritimes with its "Japanese Tower"
- structures at the Parc Oriental de Maulévrier, Paris, 1899-1913
- reconstruction of the Japanese Tower at Laeken, outside Brussels, for King Leopold II, c. 1901
- the new Chinese Pavilion at Laeken, for Leopold II, c. 1902
- royal racetrack at Ostend, for Leopold II
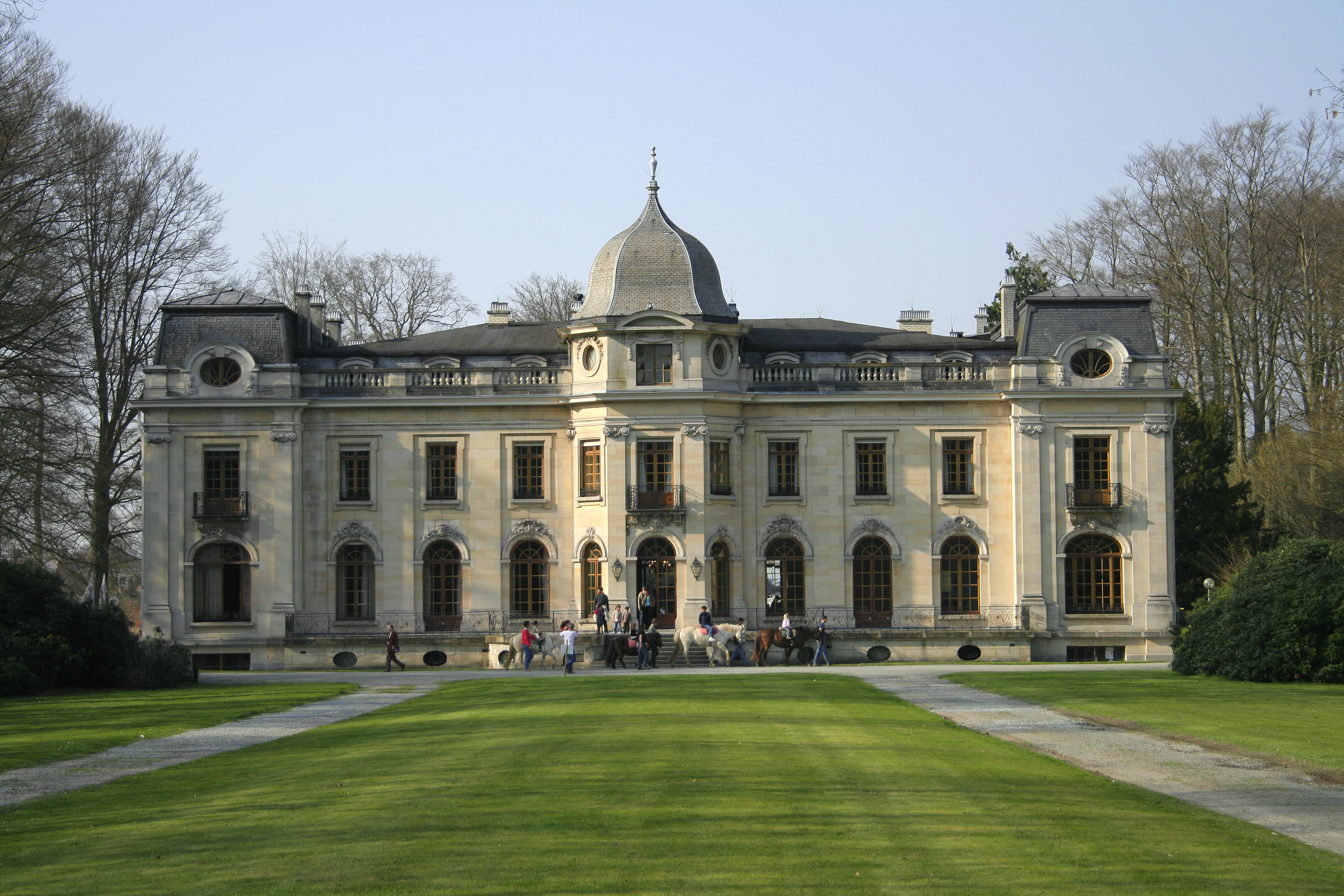
  Château Empein
  grand hall of the Heliopolis Palace Hotel, Heliopolis, Cairo, 1910
- Baron Empain Palace (Qasr Al Baron), Heliopolis, Cairo, completed 1911
- Latin Catholic Basilica "Basilique de Notre-Dame", Heliopolis, Cairo, 1910
- Palace for the Jagatjit Singh of Kapurthala, now Punjab, India, 1911
- French Embassy, Shiba Park, Tokyo, 1913
- Lafayette Escadrille Memorial, Villeneuve-l'Étang Imperial Estate, in Marnes-la-Coquette, Hauts-de-Seine, outside of Paris, 1928

== Honours and awards ==
- Officier of the Order of the Legion of Honour
- Officier of the Ordre des Palmes Académiques

== Sources ==
- Online biography
