= Al Waily =

District of Cairo, Egypt

Al Waily حي الوايلي
- District
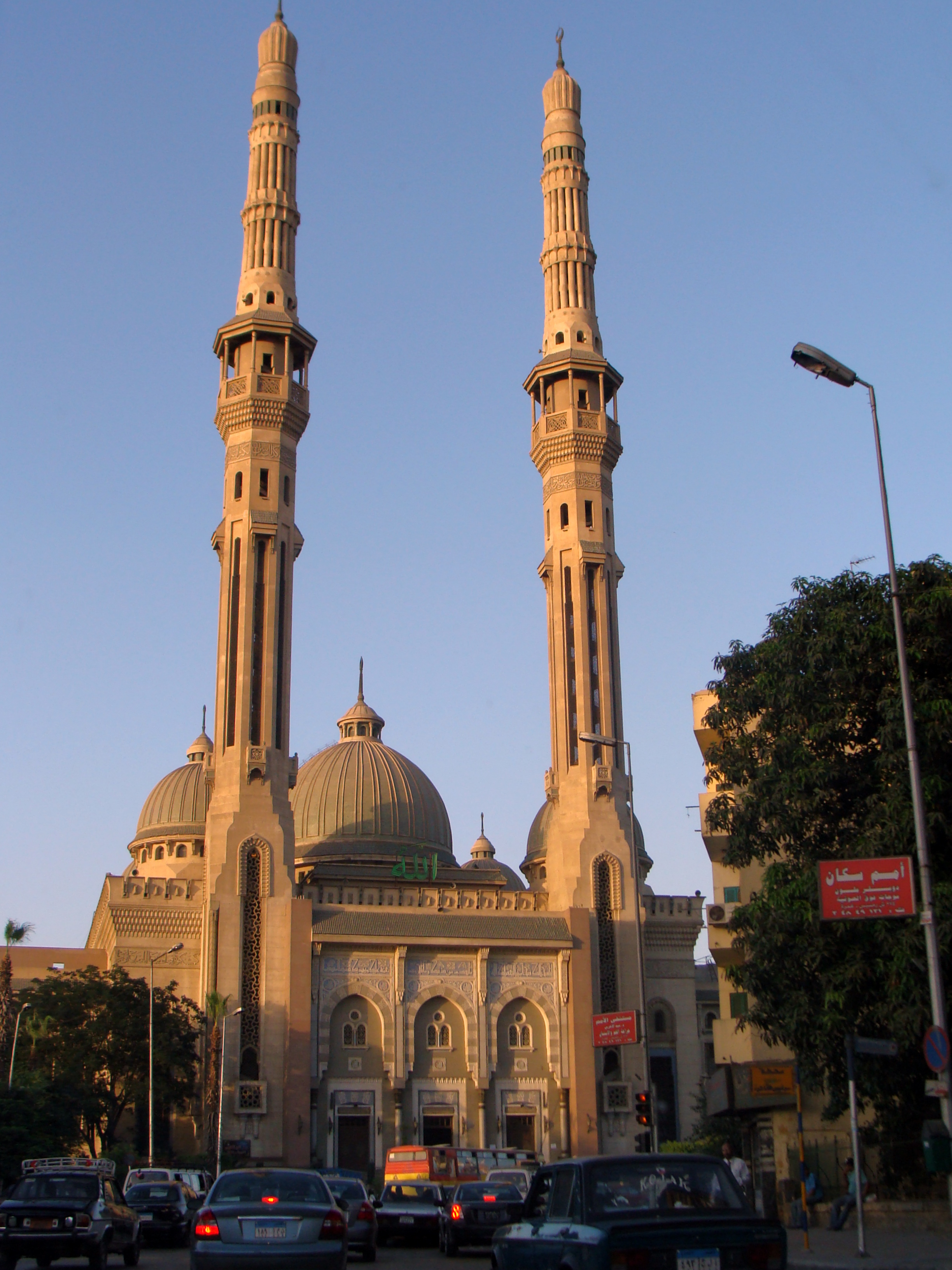
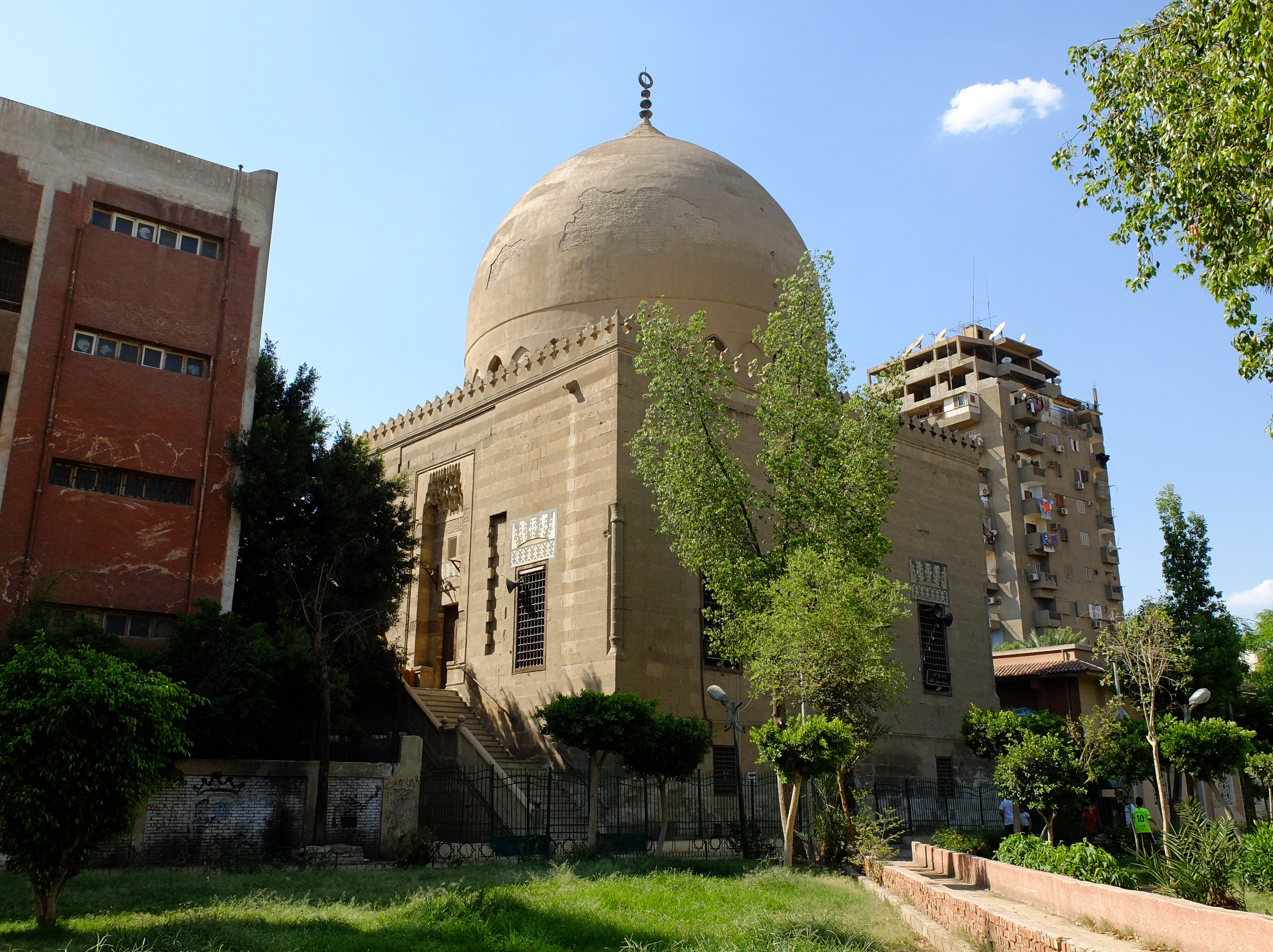
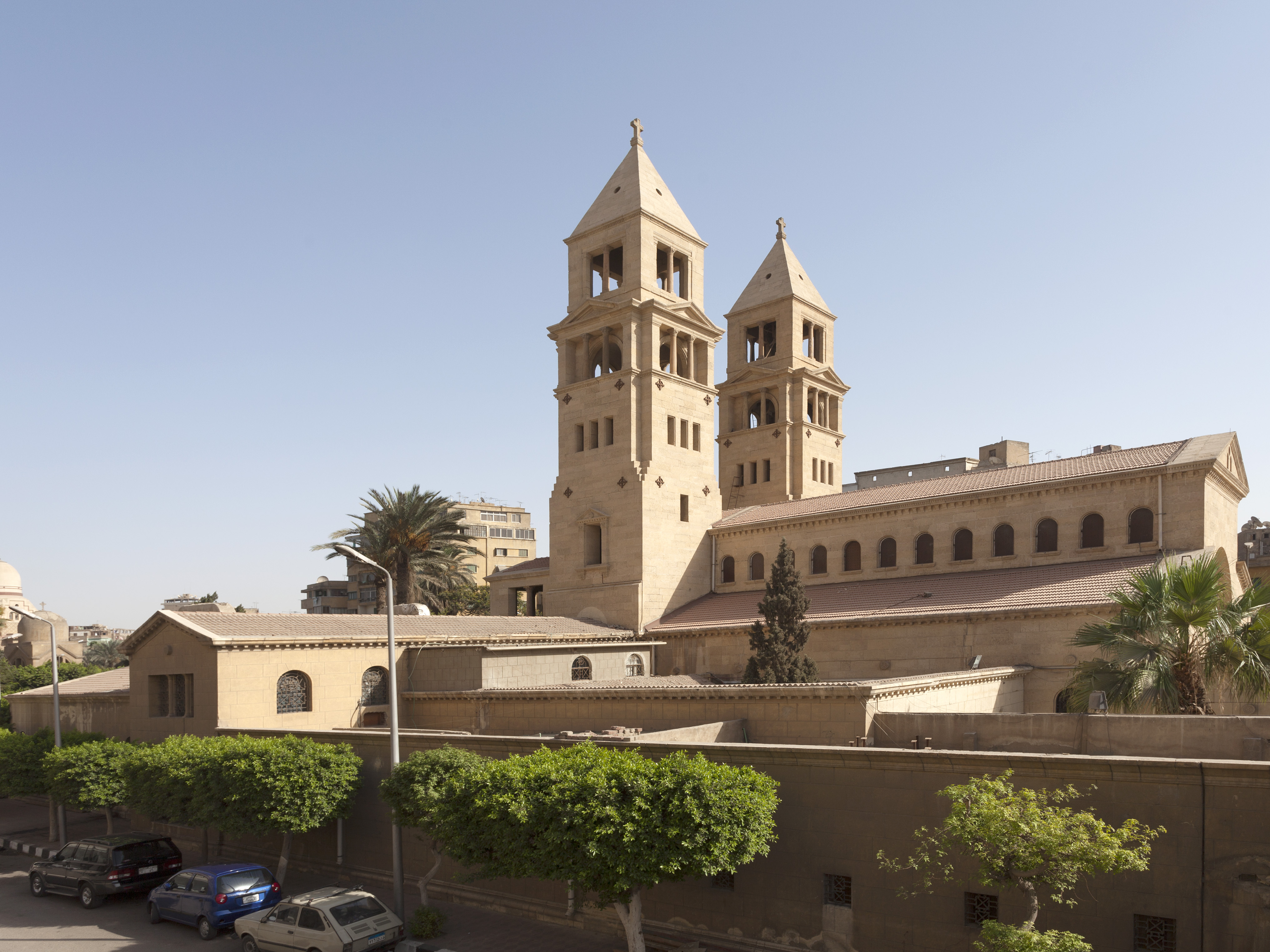
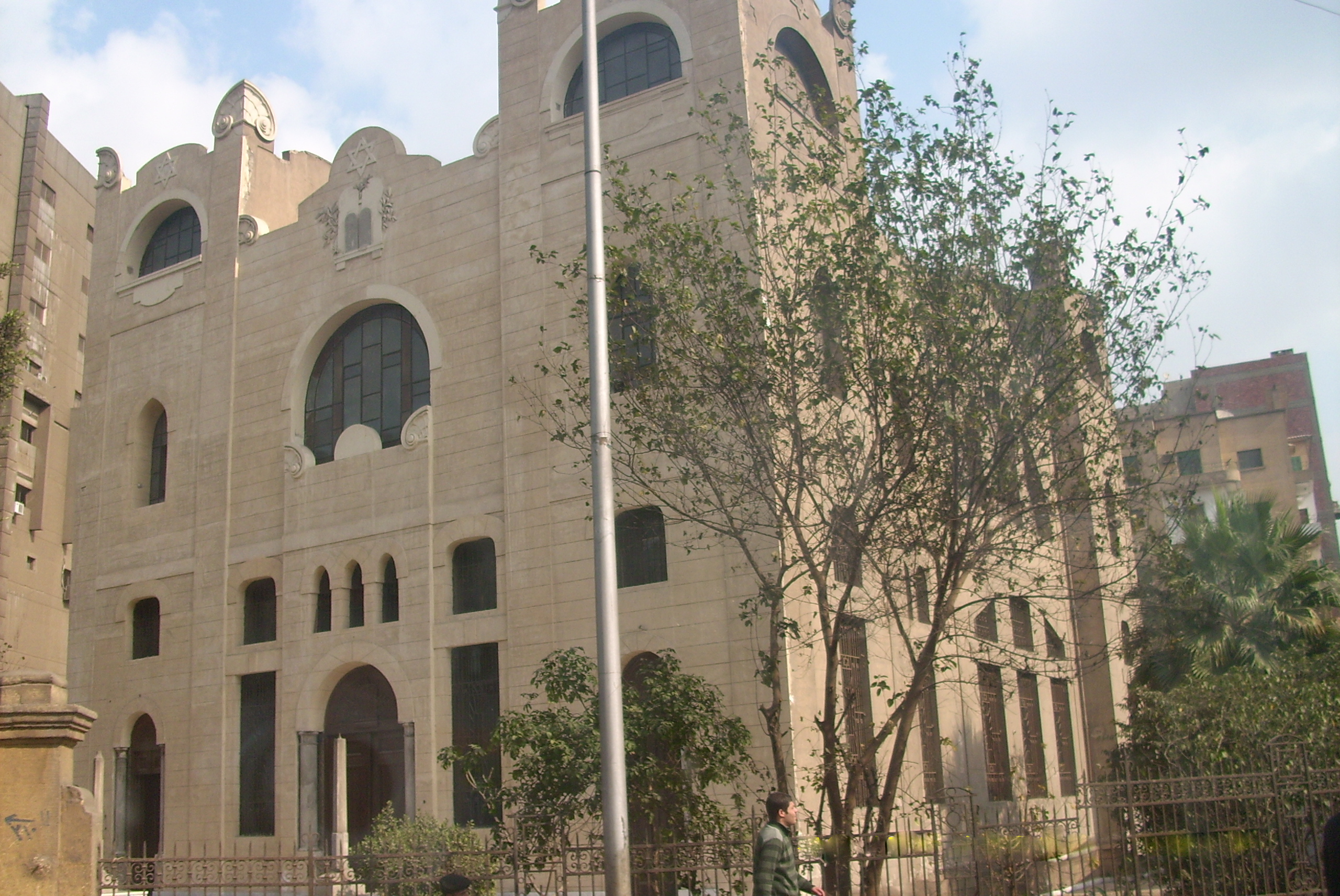
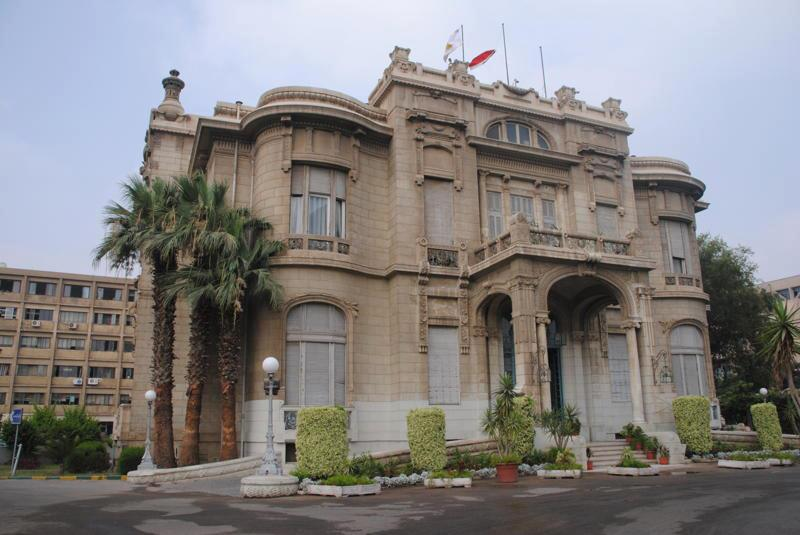
- Clockwise: El Nour Mosque, St. Peter's Church, Zaafaranah Palace, Karaite Jewish Temple, Qubba al-Fadawiyya

- Location in Egypt
- Coordinates: 30°04′00″N 31°16′34″E
- Country: Egypt
- Governorate: Cairo Governorate
- Time zone: UTC+2 (EST)

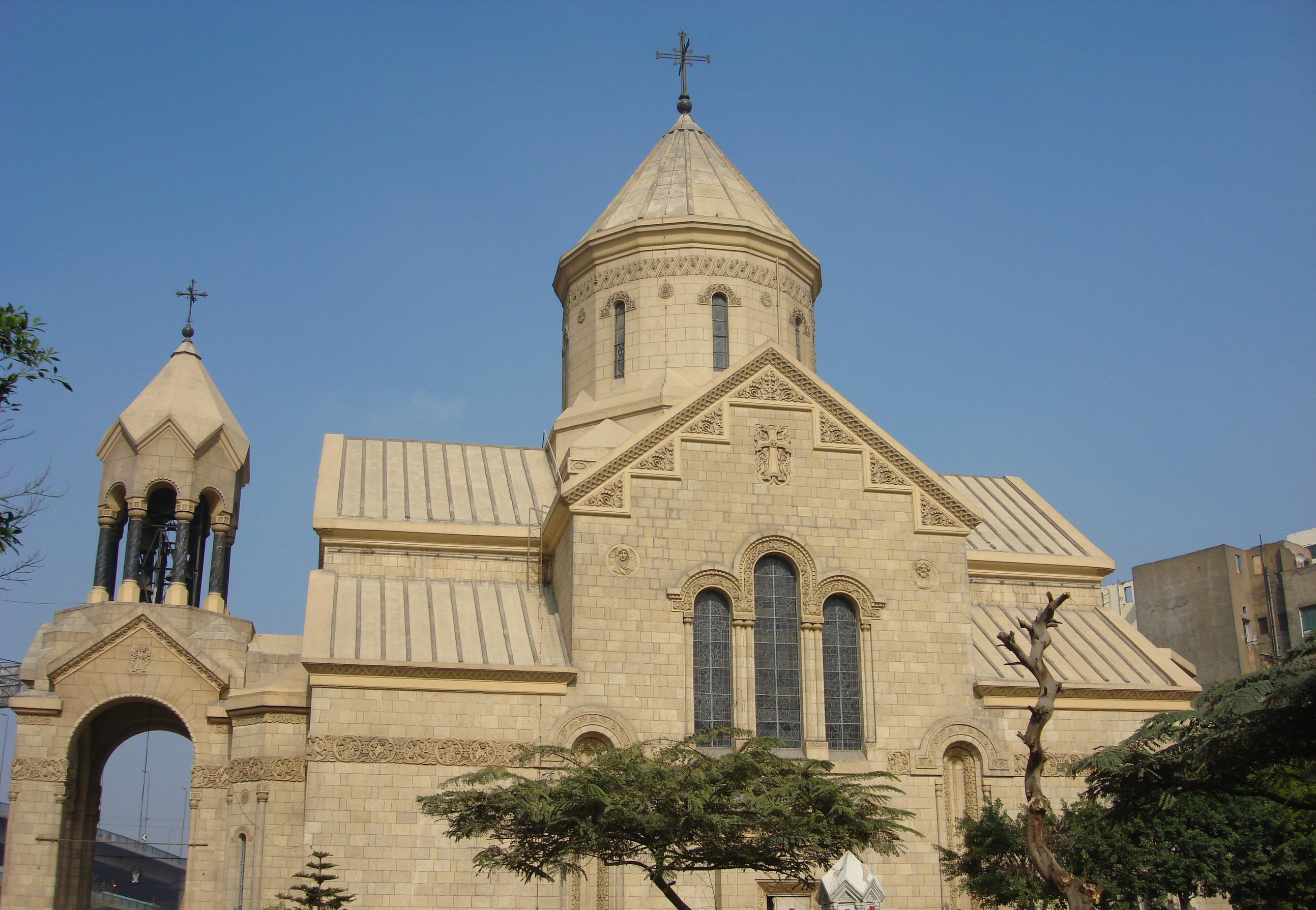
Church of Gregory the Illuminator, an Armenian Catholic church in the district

Al-Waily (Arabic: الوايلي is a district in the Western Area of Cairo, Egypt. It is subdivided into the qisms (police wards) of al-Waily and of their better known quarters are Sakakini and Abbassia.

== History ==
The area of Al Waily was known as the Square of Qaraqush, where it was used as polo grounds by the 12th century Ayyubid regent Qaraqush, north west of Cairo's walls. After the conquest of Cairo by the Mamluks, the new sultan al-Zahir Baybars built his eponymous mosque over the polo grounds in 1268.

Until the mid-19th century, the area north of the mosque was the rural fringe of Cairo, consisting of the villages of El-Waylia, El-Demerdash, El-Mohamady and the Kobba palace izba (hamlet).

In 1849, Egypt's ruler, Abbass Pasha I, redeveloped the area into the Abbasia neighbourhood. However, by the late 19th century the area was sparsely developed, where the contractor and real estate developer Sakakini Pasha bought a parcel of "swampy mosquito infested" land immediately north of al-Zahir mosque, and built a radial grid development in 1897, with his circular palace placed in the middle of the grid. This area is known today as the Sakakini quarter (shiakha) in qism al-Zahir.

== Administrative subdivisions and population ==
Al-Waily district is divided into the qisms of al-Zahir and al-Waily according to the Cairo Governorate district map and the census.

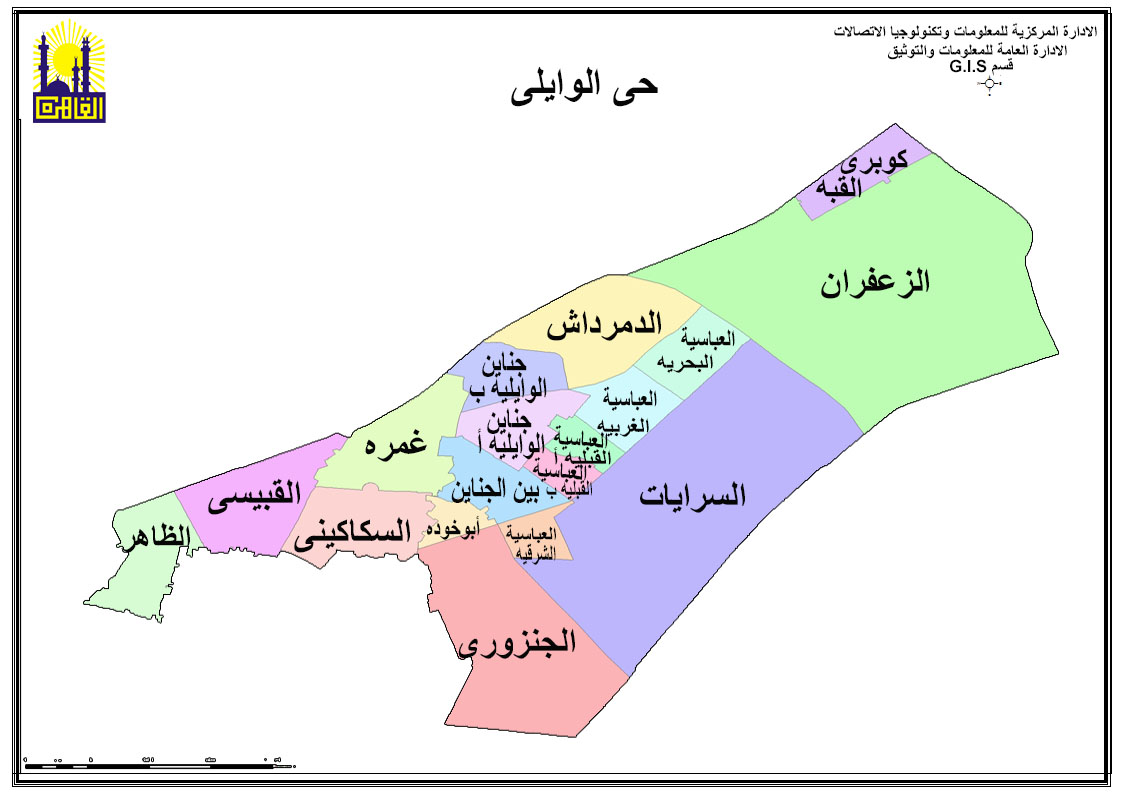
Al-Waily district map by shiakha

In 2017 qism al-Waily had 79,292 residents in its 12 shiakhas.

Shiakha	Code 2017	Population
Dimirdâsh, al-	012401	3503
Za`farân, al-	012402	4797
Sarâyât, al-	012403	10513
`Abbâsiyya al-baḥriyya, al-	012404	7424
`Abbâsiyya al-sharqiyya, al-	012405	3512
`Abbâsiyya al-gharbiyya, al-	012406	10170
`Abbâsiyya al-qibliyya A, al-	012407	4857
`Abbâsiyya al-qibliyya B, al-	012408	4228
Bayn al-Janâyin	012409	5758
Janâyyîn al-Wâyliyya A	012410	10911
Janâyyîn al-Wâyliyya B	012411	4732
Kûbrî al-Qubba	012412	8887

Qism Al-Zahir had 71,870 residents in its six shiakhas in 2017.

Shiakha	Code 2017	Population
Abû Khûda	012301	4792
Janzûrî, al-	012302	10803
Sakâkînî, al-	012303	16239
Ẓâhir, al-	012304	10234
Qubaysî, al-	012305	13517
Ghamra	012306	16285
