= Pahad Itzhak Synagogue =

Former synagogue in Cairo, Egypt

- Hebrew: בית כנסת פחד יצחק
- Location of the former synagogue, relative to the Nile Delta

Religion
- Affiliation: Judaism (former)
- Ecclesiastical or organizational status: Synagogue
- Status: Abandoned

Location
- Location: 9 Ibn Khaldoun Street, Sakkakini, Abbasiyah, Al-Daher, western Cairo
- Country: Egypt
- Interactive map of Pahad Itzhak Synagogue
- Coordinates: 30°03′58″N 31°15′53″E

Architecture
- Completed: 1925

The Pahad Itzhak Synagogue (Hebrew: בית כנסת פחד יצחק), also known as the Kraim Synagogue, is a former Jewish synagogue, located at 9 Ibn Khaldoun Street, Sakkakini, in the Abbasiyah neighbourhood of Al-Daher, in western Cairo, Egypt. It was completed in 1925.

The name Kraim refers to the synagogue's gabbai, Zaki Kraim, who oversaw its remodeling between 1925 and 1932.

== See also ==
- History of the Jews in Egypt
- Synagogues in Cairo
- List of synagogues in Egypt
