= Kamilia Shehata =

Egyptian educator

Kamilia Shehata Zakher (Arabic: كاميليا شحاته زاخر; born 22 July 1985) is a schoolteacher in Deir Mawas, Egypt, and wife of Tadros Samaan, the Coptic Priest of Saint Mark's Church in Mowas Cathedral in Minya. Her disappearance in July 2010 sparked protests and rumours of kidnapping and forced conversion to Islam. Her subsequent return to the Church inflamed sectarian tensions between Egypt's Muslim majority and the Christian minority.

== Background ==
Shehata disappeared from her home in Deir Mawas on 18 July 2010 following a family dispute, according to a police report. According to some reports the dispute was over her desire to convert to Islam. Rumours of her forced conversion to Islam began circulating among Egypt's Copts after Shehata's husband and family initially claimed she had been kidnapped, a claim discounted by police. Ensuing Coptic protests in Cairo and in her home province of Minya demanded her return.

== Controversy ==
Shehata was discovered on July 23 at the home of a friend in Cairo. She denied being kidnapped and Church officials confirmed she had left her home of her own free will. Differing accounts claim that after she was located, police either returned Shehata to her family or turned her over to the custody of the Church. Shehata herself has made no public statement with the exception of a video whose authenticity is disputed. Her whereabouts are unknown and the Church claims she is under its protection, saying she was "transferred from her family's home in Ain Shams in Cairo to a church guest house to keep her away from the tension."

Shehata's return was met with rival protests by Egyptian Muslims who believed Shehata had converted to Islam but had been forcibly returned to the Church. Images of a niqāb-clad Shehata have been widely displayed in protests and on internet sites devoted to her supposed abduction and detention, although the authenticity of the images has been questioned. The Egyptian daily Al-masry Al-youm described them as "photo-shopped".

In August 2010, Egyptian lawyers Nezar Ghorab, Gamal Tag and Tarek Abubakr filed a lawsuit against the Grand Sheikh of Al-Azhar Mosque and the Egyptian Minister of Interior, asserting that they had colluded to prevent Shehata from converting to Islam, a claim denied by the Secretary General of Al-Azhar’s Fatwa Committee, who said that "Kamilia never came to Al-Azhar and we know nothing about her." The lawyers filed a related suit against Egyptian President Hosni Mubarak.

Another lawyer, Mamdouh Ismail, submitted a request with the attorney-general that Christian places of worship be searched to ascertain her whereabouts, and filed an administrative suit against Coptic Pope Shenouda III that alleged Shehata was being held against her will and demanded her release. Also Husam Abu al-Bukhari called for a protest near Al-Nour Mosque in Abbassia to support Kamilia Shehata.

Representatives of Egyptian Initiative for Personal Rights, an independent Egyptian human rights organization, also criticized the security forces for handing over an adult to the Church against her will, an act the organization says violates the Egyptian constitution. EIPR director Hossam Bahgat characterized the actions of the authorities and the Church as a misguided attempt to avoid sectarian strife, telling Daily News Egypt that "Church leaders and police might think that they've suppressed the beginnings of a sectarian problem through 'delivering' a grown up citizen to her family like a piece of furniture, but the truth is that the whole society, including all its sects, loses when it gets involved in this flagrant violation of one of its citizens."

In May 2011, Shehata appeared on a Coptic satellite television network, Al-Hayat, and stated that she was living with her husband and son and had not converted to Islam or been held against her will by the Church. She claimed that photos on the Internet appearing to show her in hijab had been fabricated.

The Islamic State used the incident to justify the 2015 kidnapping and beheading of 21 Coptic Christian construction workers in Libya in revenge.
