= Husam =

Husam is a given name and surname. Notable people with the name include:

- Ahmed Husam (born 1995), Maldivian swimmer
- Husam Abu al-Bukhari, Egyptian activist, Islamic thinker, physician, and researcher
- Husam al-Din Timurtash (1105–1154), Artuqid emir of Mardin and ruler of Aleppo
- Husam Azzam (born 1975), Palestinian track and field athlete
- Husam Chadat (born 1966), Syrian-German actor and director
- Husam Musa (born 1959), Malaysian politician
- Husam Kamal (born 1996), Qatari footballer
- Husam Uddin Chowdhury Fultali (born 1974), Bangladeshi Islamic scholar and author
- Husam Zomlot (born 1973), Palestinian diplomat, academic and economist
