= Moussa Dar'i Synagogue =

Former kenesa in Cairo, Egypt

- Hebrew: בית הכנסת הקראי בקהיר; Arabic: كنيس موسى الدرعي
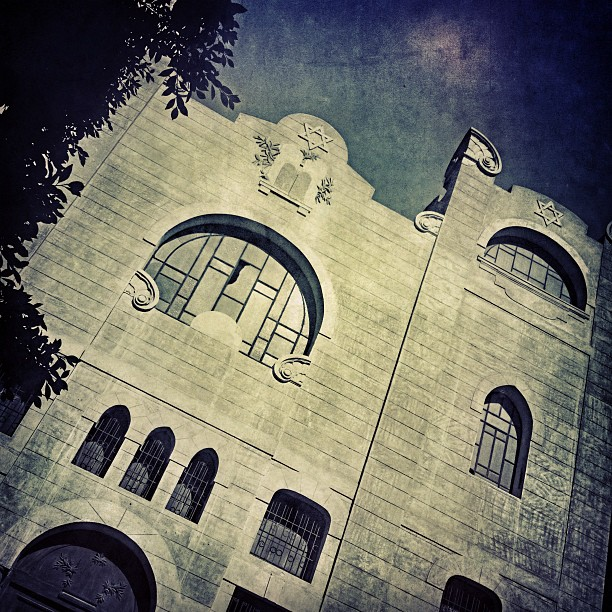
- The former synagogue façade, in 2013

- Location of the former synagogue, relative to the Nile Delta

Religion
- Affiliation: Karaite Judaism (former)
- Ecclesiastical or organizational status: Synagogue or Kenesa
- Status: Abandoned

Location
- Location: 25 Sebyl El Khazindar Street, Midan el Gueish, Abbasiyah, Al-Daher, western Cairo
- Country: Egypt
- Interactive map of Moussa Dar'i Synagogue
- Coordinates: 30°03′43″N 31°16′28″E

Architecture
- Completed: 1931

The Moussa Dar'i Synagogue (Hebrew: בית הכנסת הקראי בקהיר; Arabic: كنيس موسى الدرعي) is a former Karaite Jewish synagogue or kenesa, located at 25 Sebyl El Khazindar Street, Midan el Gueish, in the Abbasiyah area of the Al-Daher district in western Cairo, Egypt. The synagogue was completed in 1931.

== History ==
In 1900, Sitaytah al-Musaffi, the widow of Sitatah al Musafi (Hebrew: סתתה אל-מספי), donated a large plot of land in the Abbasiyah area to the Jewish community. Between 1906 and 1930, because there was no synagogue nearby, Jews held services in various locations throughout the growing neighborhood. Construction was completed in 1931. The synagogue has no chairs or benches. Instead, worshippers used to sit on mats and rugs. There are wooden lockers near the entrance in which attendees place their shoes prior to services. The structure has two storeys: the first is the sanctuary and the second is what was originally intended to be a women’s gallery. Between 1940 and 1942, there were plan to build a cultural center at the synagogue. However, due to differences of opinion amongst community members, it was never built.

The synagogue is named after 12th century Karaite poet and physician Moses ben Abraham Darʿī (Moussa), born in Alexandria, by a suggestion of the community's rabbi, Rav Tuvya.

A long-lost manuscript, the Zechariah Ben ‘Anan, was located at the synagogue in July 2017 by Israeli historian Yoram Meital. The manuscript was originally written in 1028 CE, was considered to be one of the era’s most complete and well-preserved editions of the third and final book of the Ketuvim.

== See also ==
- History of the Jews in Egypt
- Synagogues in Cairo
- List of synagogues in Egypt
