= El Sakkakini =

District in Cairo, Egypt

Coordinates: 30.067°N 31.266°E

El Sakkakini السكاكيني
- district
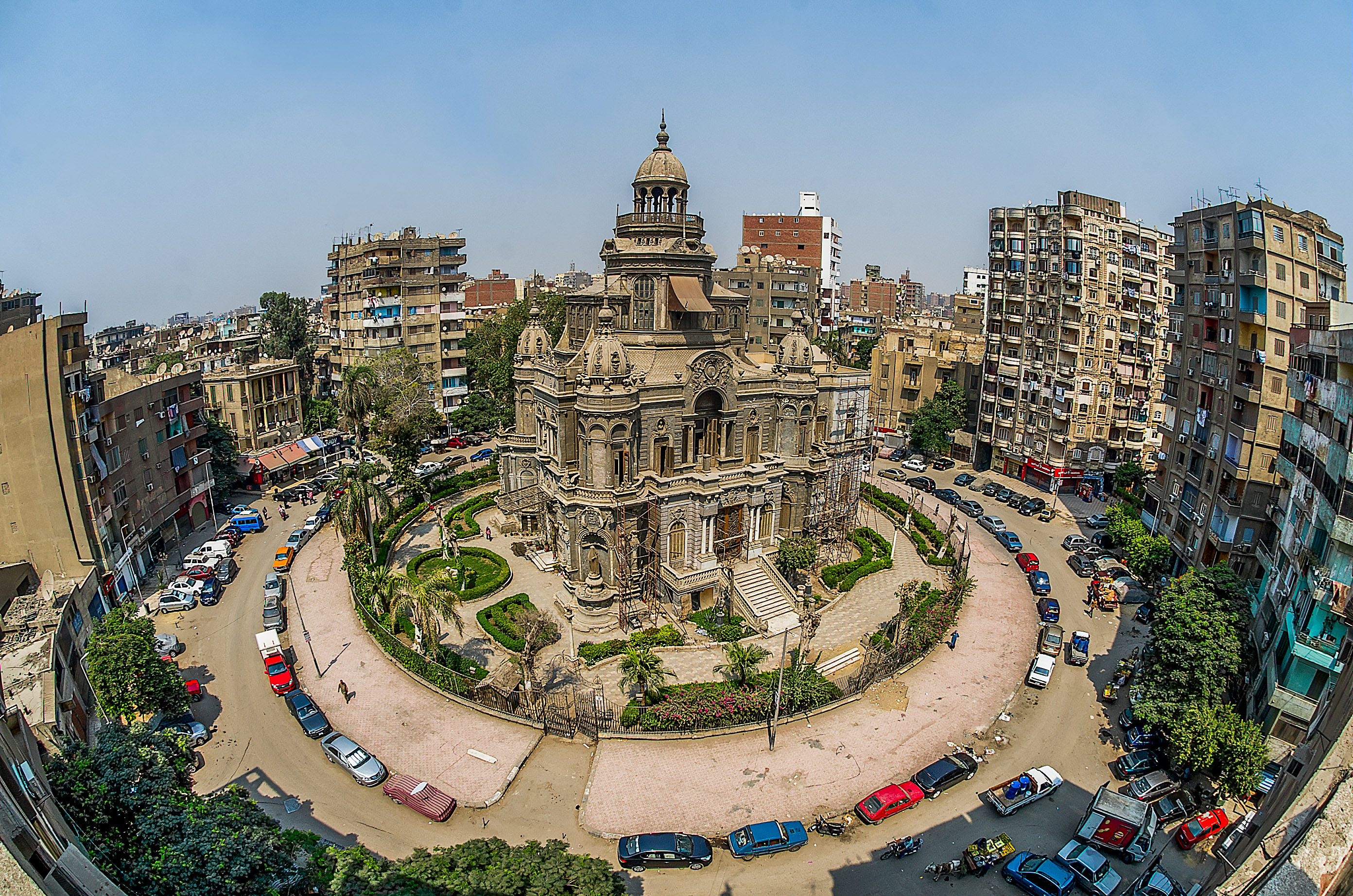

- Location in Egypt
- Country: Egypt
- Governorate: Cairo Governorate
- Time zone: UTC+2 (EET)
  - Summer (DST): UTC+3 (EEST)

El Sakkakini (Arabic: السكاكيني) is a small district (quarter) in Cairo, Egypt that neighbours the El Zaher and Abbaseya districts.

El Sakkakini was originally part of El Zaher, but it was named after a huge building built by a prominent French architect, and was owned by the head of the Syrian Skakkini family, Count Gabriel Habib Sakkakini Pasha (1841–1923), consisting of a palace and a church in the same area in 1897. In addition, Sakkakini Pasha, is known to have established the Roman Catholic Patriarchate in Faggala and the Roman Catholic Cemetery in Old Cairo.

== Famous residents ==
- Taha Hussein
- The Palestinian president Yasser Arafat was raised in Sakkikini in the 1930s.
- The composer Halim El-Dabh was born in Sakkakini in 1921.

== See also ==
- Khalil al-Sakakini
