= Husam Abu al-Bukhari =

Egyptian politician and Islamic thinker

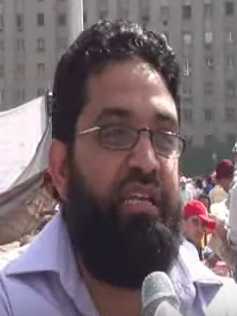
- Abu al-Bukhari in 2011
- Occupations: activist, physician

Husam Abu al-Bukhari is an Egyptian activist, Islamic thinker, physician, and researcher in comparative religion.

== Career ==
He came into limelight after his call for a protest near Al-Nour Mosque in Abbassia in the events of Kamilia Shehata. After the January 25 revolution in the Egyptian media, as one of the participants in the revolution, he appeared frequently in political programs and television debates as a representative of the Islamic movement, especially the Salafist.

In May 2013, Abu al-Bukhari said that he had been harassed by State Security Investigations Service, and he stated that they were returning by violence, and that some officers of the dissolved State Security Service had threatened a number of symbols of the Islamic movement. He called for demonstrations against them. He organized a demonstration next to the State Security building in Nasr City on May 2, 2013.

After the overthrow of former President Mohamed Morsi; Abu al-Bukhari participated in the Rabaa al-Adawiya sit-in, and after the August 2013 Rabaa massacre he was arrested at about nine in the morning, and was shot in the face by security forces. The news of his death spread, and at about six o'clock in the evening, the security forces came to the Health Insurance Hospital. They arrested him from inside the hospital again, and it was confirmed that he was being held at the State Security headquarters in Nasr City, despite his injury.

The Egyptian Public Prosecution office declared that he was alive and ordered his detention for 15 days. He was sent to Scorpion Prison. In February 2016, the State Security Investigations Service's investigations published the accusation of Hussam Abu Al-Bukhari, along with Sayed Mashagheb, founder of the Ultras White Knights Association, Khaled Harbi, the director of the Islamic Observatory, and 19 others, of inciting and calling for the attack on the State Security Investigations Service building on May 2, 2013. In October 2017, the Supreme State Security Court sentenced Hussam Abu al-Bukhari to 10 years in prison, and acquitted Sayed Mashagheb and Khaled Harbi.
