= Vitali Madjar Synagogue =

Former synagogue in Cairo, Egypt

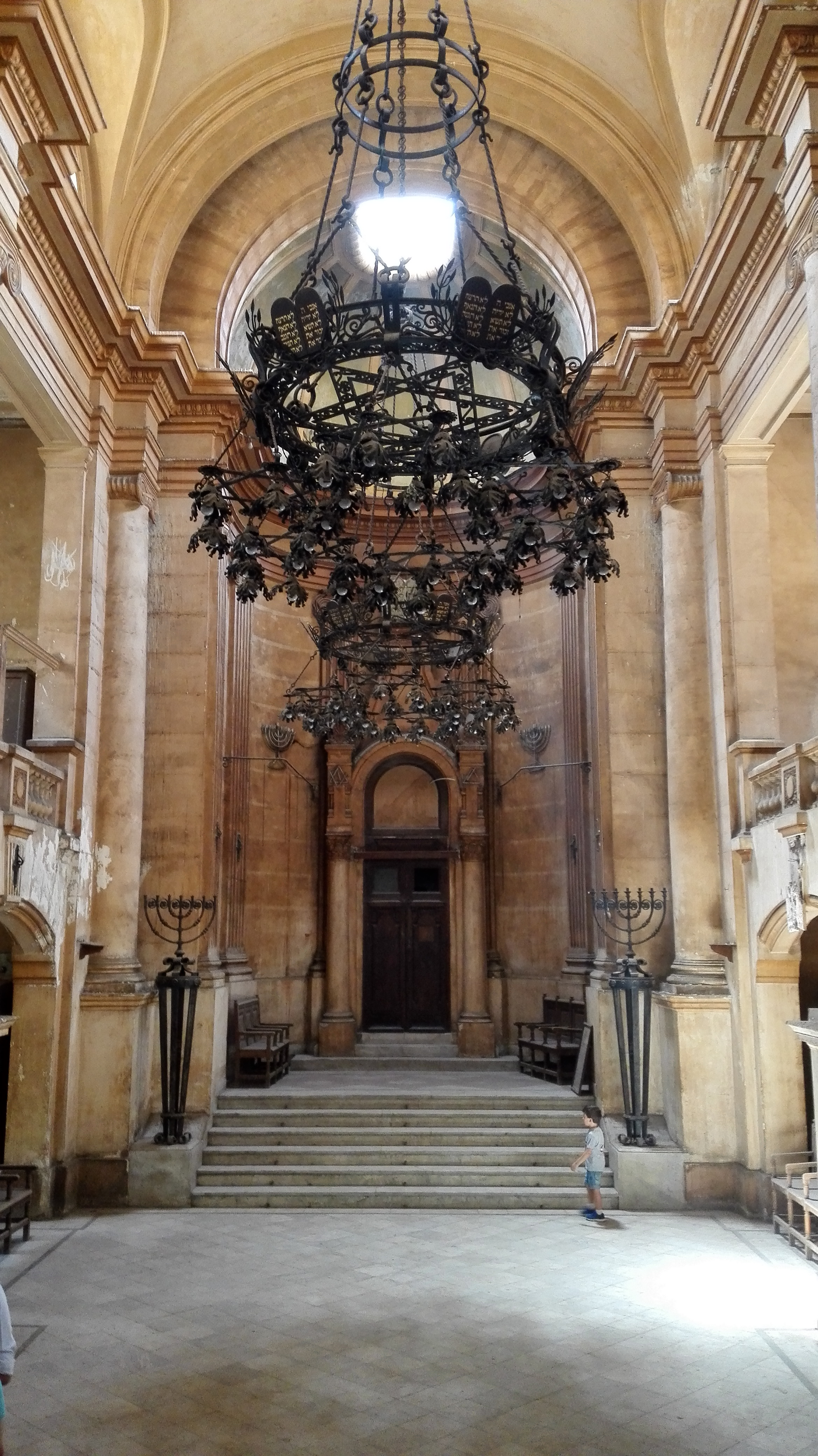

- Location of the former synagogue, relative to the Nile Delta

Religion
- Affiliation: Judaism (former)
- Ecclesiastical or organizational status: Synagogue
- Status: High Holidays only

Location
- Location: 3 el-Missalah Street, Heliopolis, Cairo
- Country: Egypt
- Interactive map of Vitali Madjar Synagogue
- Coordinates: 30°05′30″N 31°19′28″E

Architecture
- Completed: 1928

The Vitali Madjar Synagogue is a former Jewish synagogue, located at 3 el-Missalah Street, off Ibrahim Street, in the Masr El Gedida district of Heliopolis, in Cairo, Egypt. It was erected in 1928.

In 2010 it was reported that the 80-year-old former president of the synagogue, Carmen Weinstein, was convicted in absentia and sentenced to three years imprisonment for property fraud. Weinstein sold the former synagogue to a third party. The Court determined that she was not authorized to sell the building on behalf of the congregation. When the sale did not progress, Weinstein withheld the title deeds and the refund of downpayments received in advance of the settlement.

Despite being inactive for many years, the synagogue was opened to the community for services during Hanukkah in 2022 and Rosh Hashanah in 2023.

== See also ==
- History of the Jews in Egypt
- Synagogues in Cairo
- List of synagogues in Egypt
