= Synagogues in Cairo =

There are number of former synagogues in Cairo, the capital city of Egypt. The number of Egyptian Jews in the city has decreased significantly from its peak. As of December 2022, there were twelve remaining synagogues but only three native Egyptian Jewish inhabitants in the city.

As of October 2024, the only active synagogues in Cairo was Sha'ar Hashamayim Synagogue.

== Historical background ==
The Egyptian Jews constitute both one of the oldest and youngest Jewish communities in the world. The historic core of the indigenous community consisted mainly of Arabic-speaking Rabbanites and Karaites. After their expulsion from Spain, more Sephardi and Karaite Jews began to emigrate to Egypt and their numbers increased significantly with the growth of trading prospects after the opening of the Suez Canal in 1869. As a result, Jews from all over the territories of the Ottoman Empire as well as Italy and Greece started to settle in the main cities of Egypt, where they thrived. The Ashkenazi community, mainly confined to Cairo's Darb al-Barabira quarter, began to arrive in the aftermath of the waves of pogroms that hit Europe in the latter part of the 19th century. In the late 1950s, Egypt began to expel its Jewish population (estimated at between 75,000 and 80,000 in 1948), also sequestering Jewish-owned property at this time. In 2016, the spiritual leader of the Jewish community in the city of Cairo, Magda Tania Haroun, stated that there were 6 Jews remaining in the city, all women over the age of 65. In 2022 it was reported that there were only three Jews remaining in Cairo, a decrease from five Jews in July 2019.

== Active synagogue ==
=== Sha'ar HaShamayim Synagogue ===
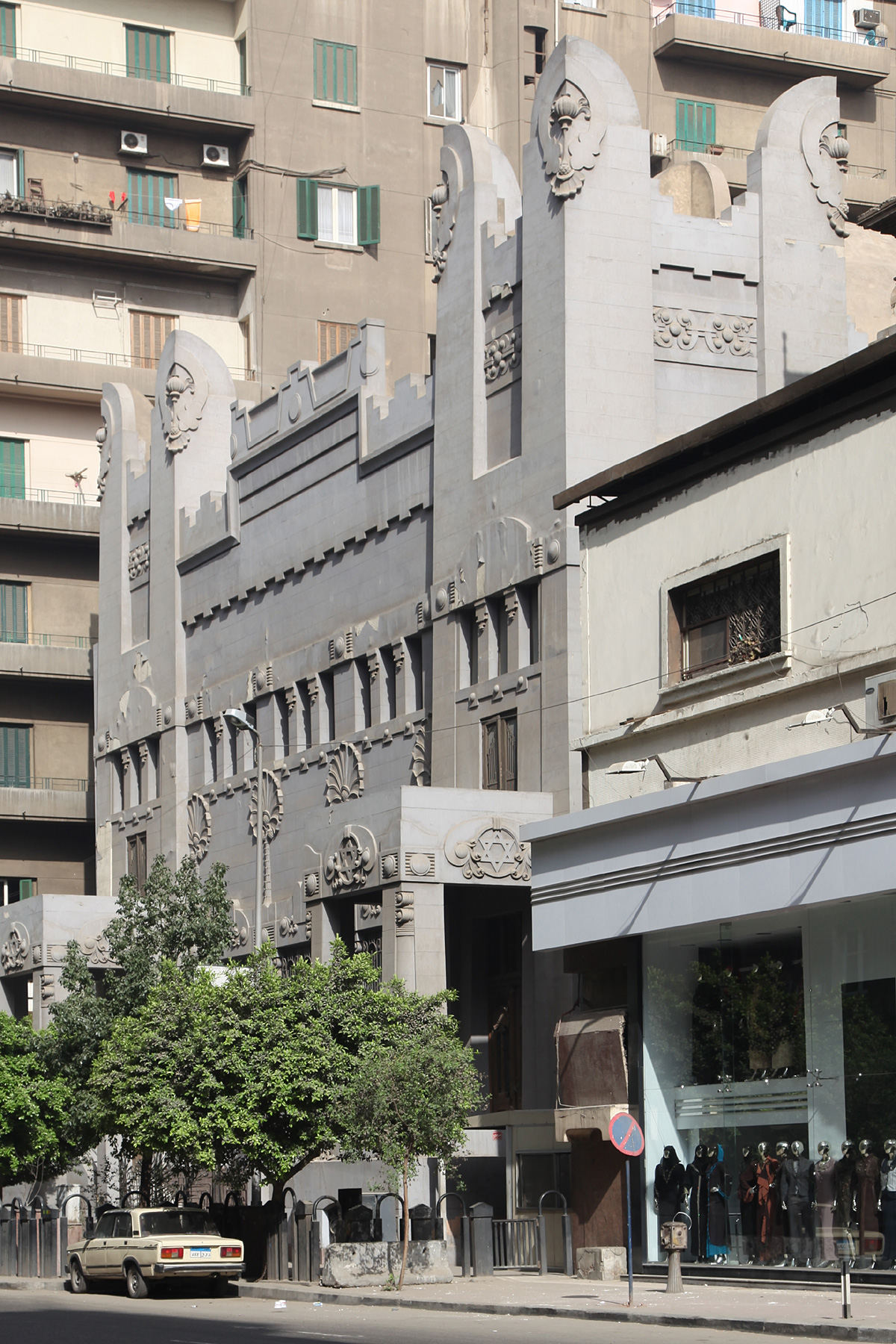
The former Sha'ar HaShamayim Synagogue

The Sha'ar Hashamayim Synagogue (in Hebrew: שער השמים; in Arabic: كنيس عدلي) is located in Cairo. The synagogue was also known as Ismailia Temple and the synagogue at Adly Street. His historical leader was the great rabbi Chaim Nahum. In 2008, the synagogue celebrated its 100th anniversary. The synagogue was built in a style similar to the ancient Egyptian temples, and once it was the largest building on the boulevard.

== Preserved synagogues ==
=== Ben Ezra Synagogue ===
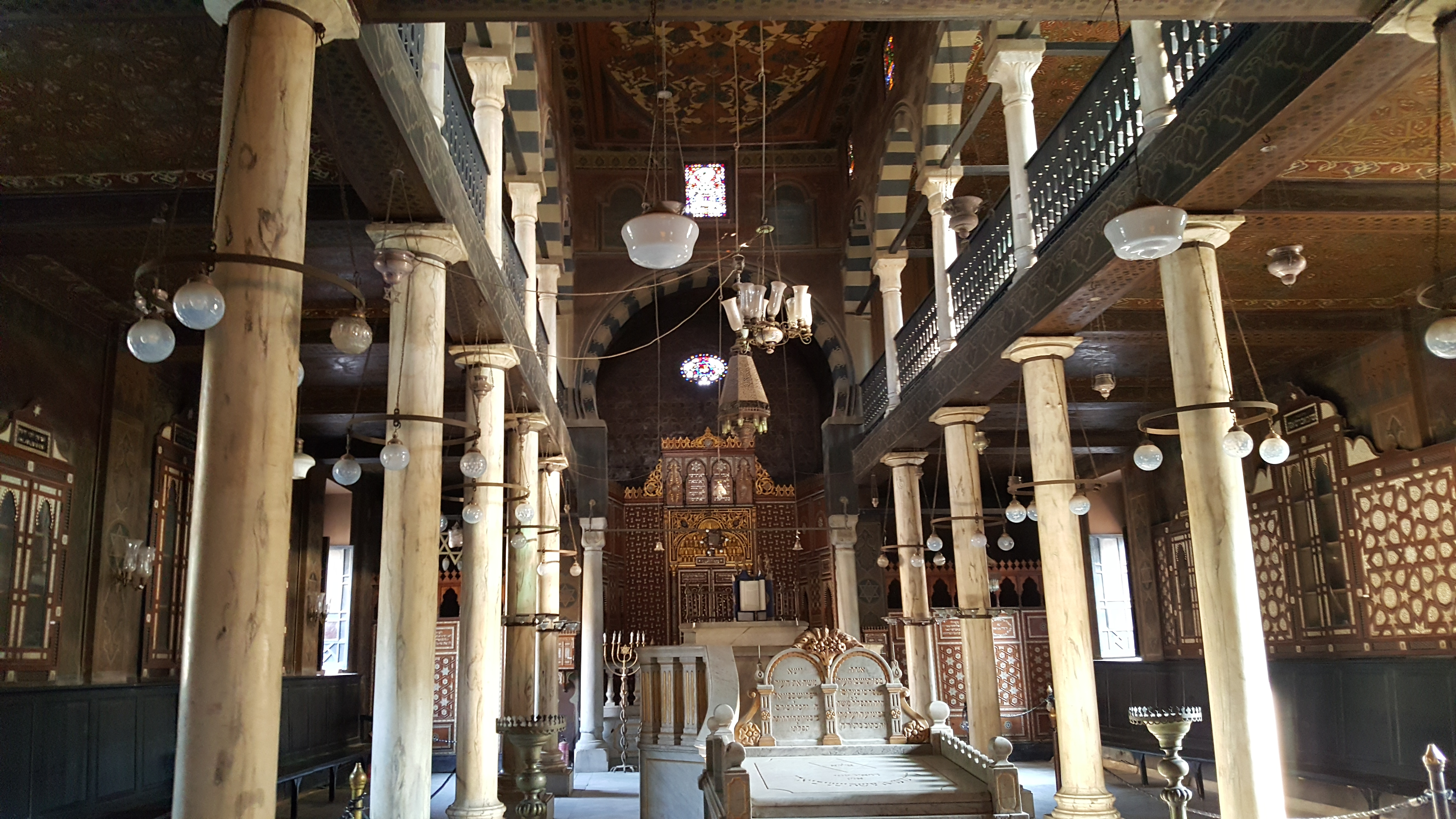
Interior of the former Ben Ezra Synagogue

The Ben Ezra Synagogue (Hebrew: בית כנסת בן עזרא; Arabic: معبد بن عزرا), sometimes referred to as the El-Geniza Synagogue (Hebrew: בית כנסת אל גניזה) or the Synagogue of the Levantines (al-Shamiyin), is a former Orthodox Jewish congregation and synagogue, located in the Fustat part of Old Cairo. According to local folklore, it is located on the site where baby Moses was found.

=== Ets Hayim Synagogue ===
The Ets Hayim Synagogue (in Hebrew: בית הכנסת עץ חיים; in Arabic: معبد حنان) is a synagogue located in Cairo. The temple was built in 1900. The synagogue is located in Daher district. The marble floor of the temple was damaged during the earthquake of October 12, 1992. The synagogue is protected by the Egyptian supreme antiquity council. The temple is guarded by a police officer. The synagogue was used for the last time in 1967.

=== Maimonides Synagogue ===
The Maimonides Synagogue (Hebrew: בית כנסת הרמב"ם, romanized: Bet Knesset ha-Rambam; Arabic: كنيس ابن ميمون), also known as the Rav Moshe Synagogue or the Ibn Maïmoun Synagogue, is an historic former Jewish synagogue, located in the Jewish quarter, el-Muski. A synagogue has existed in the area since the 10th century and was later called by the name of the famous Jewish philosopher, rabbi and doctor Maimonides, after his arrival, around 1168, as a result of his exile in Córdoba, Spain, at the hands of the Almohades. It is believed that the original tomb of Maimonides is located within the building. In March 2010, the Egyptian government completed the restoration of the current building which dates from the late 19th century.

=== Others ===
Other synagogues that are no longer in active, yet preserved, include the Moussa Dar'i, Pahad Itzhak, Vitali Madjar, Haïm Capoussi, Meyr Biton and Ashkenazi synagogues.

== Destroyed synagogues or synagogue ruins ==
=== Beit Aharon Synagogue ===
Beit Aharon Synagogue, or Helwan Synagogue, also known as Beit Aharon Temple, was a former Jewish synagogue located in Helwan and the first synagogue in Khedival Cairo. The small building was established in 1892 as a center for the Jewish community. It was last used for religious services in 1966, and it was sold and demolished in 1995.
