= Sakakini Palace =

- قصر السكاكيني
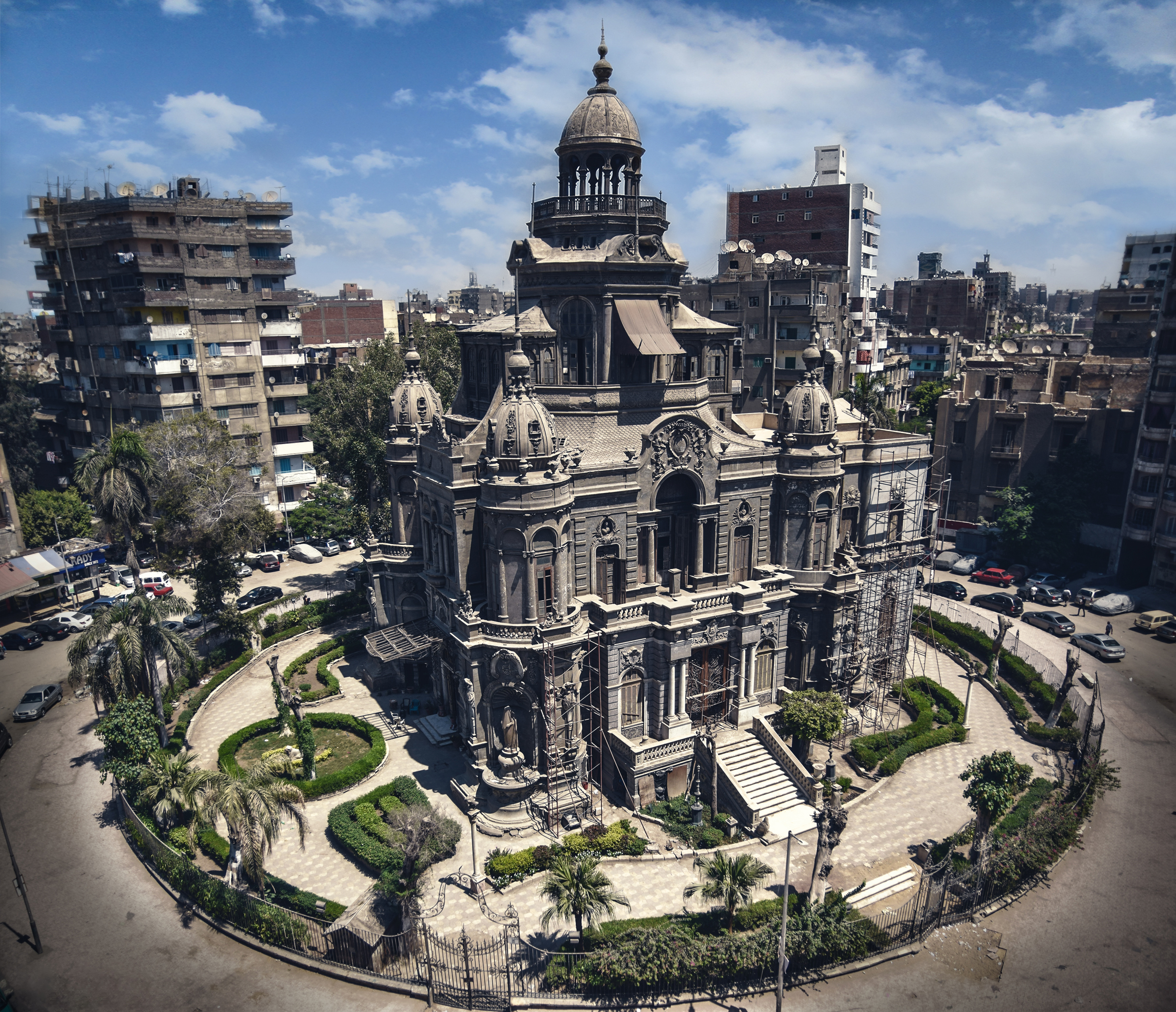
- Exterior view of El Sakakini Palace

General information
- Architectural style: Rococo
- Location: Cairo, Egypt
- Coordinates: 30.0656944°N 31.2661666°E
- Completed: 1897

Technical details
- Floor count: 5

Other information
- Number of rooms: 50

Habib Pasha El Sakakini Palace (Arabic: قصر السكاكيني) is a palace in the al-Zahir district of Cairo, Egypt. Built for the contractor Gabriel Habib Sakakini and completed in 1897, it stands on the site of a former lake at the meeting point of eight roads. Its design combines European, Ottoman and Islamic elements, with Rococo ornament on the façade. The five-storey palace contains 50 rooms, around 400 windows and doors, and about 300 statues.

After Sakakini's death in 1923, his heirs transferred the palace to the Egyptian government. It later served as the headquarters of the Socialist Union and housed the Health Education Museum until 1983. The palace was registered as a monument in 1986 and designated an Islamic and Coptic antiquity the following year. In 2024, restoration work was under way, alongside plans to reuse the building as a cultural centre.

== History ==
Gabriel Habib Sakakini (1841–1923) arrived in Egypt from Damascus at the age of 16 and worked for the Suez Canal Company in Port Said for four years before moving to Cairo. He became a building contractor and helped complete the Khedivial Opera House under the Italian architect Pietro Avoscani before the celebrations marking the opening of the Suez Canal in 1869.

Sakakini chose a site at the meeting point of eight roads in the al-Zahir district. The land, east of the Mosque of al-Zahir Baybars, had previously been occupied by a lake known as Turkmen Karaja. A decree issued by the Mixed Courts in June 1880 documented Sakakini's ownership of the land. He began draining and preparing the site in 1892, and the palace was completed in 1897. After Sakakini's death in 1923, the palace passed to his heirs, who later transferred it to the Egyptian government; one descendant, a doctor, gave his share to the Ministry of Health.

In 1961, the palace was used as the headquarters of the Arab Socialist Union before the Health Education Museum moved there from Abdeen; the basement was also used as a clinic. In 1983, the Ministry of Health ordered the museum's transfer to the Technical Institute in Imbaba; some exhibits were moved there, while others were stored in the palace basement. The Ministry of Culture registered the palace as a monument under decree 143 in 1986. The following year, Prime Ministerial Decision 1691 designated it an Islamic and Coptic antiquity and placed it under the jurisdiction of the Supreme Council of Antiquities.

== Architecture ==
Sakakini Palace in 2023

The palace occupies a 2,698 m^{2} (29,040 sq ft) site at the centre of Sakakini Square, where eight streets meet, and is enclosed by iron railings and a small garden containing statues. Its design combines European, Ottoman and Islamic architectural elements, while the floral ornament and repeated initials on the façade are features of the Rococo style. It has five storeys, 50 rooms, around 400 windows and doors, and about 300 statues.

The façade has four circular corner towers capped by ribbed domes, with a larger central dome above a tiered octagonal pavilion. Busts of Sakakini and his wife and four pairs of children are placed along the balustrades of the first-floor bedroom balconies. Four female figures representing the seasons stand on urns within shell-shaped niches flanked by caryatids. The initials "H" and "S" appear above the niches in four different designs, while Sakakini's full name and the date 1897 are inscribed in Arabic above the western entrance. Two alabaster lions stand before the main wooden door.

The main door opens into a decorated rectangular hall that leads to rooms with ornamented walls and ceilings. The basement has little decoration because it was intended for servants and kitchens. A wooden screen, a heater, a wall-mounted bookcase and a large cupboard are among the few surviving pieces of the original furnishings.

== Conservation and reuse ==
During the years of neglect, the palace's walls and paintings cracked, most of its fountains deteriorated, and statues were damaged or lost. President Hosni Mubarak later allocated US$1 million to a restoration project in which the palace was painted green and its doors yellow without following their original colours. In 2003, Egyptian archaeologist Zahi Hawass proposed restoring the building as a museum of medical sciences, but the plan was not implemented.

In October 2016, a short circuit caused a fire in the basement guardroom, damaging the outer layer of its wooden ceiling. The fire did not damage the ceiling's supporting wooden columns or the rest of the palace's architecture and decoration. Officials planned to repair the ceiling and consolidate its supporting columns after the investigation into the fire was completed.

By March 2024, the project had reinforced the palace's foundations and basement and treated cracks in its walls. Other structural elements had also been consolidated. Restorers surveyed and documented the building before and during the work, including analyses of its construction materials. The work identified the basement floor levels and uncovered coloured tiles beneath newer mosaic tiles. Wall paintings were also uncovered beneath later layers of paint. The electrical infrastructure was modernised, and new lighting was installed inside and outside the palace. Further work was planned for Sakakini Square and the surrounding area, including improvements to local amenities.

In 2024, plans called for the palace to become a cultural centre hosting exhibitions, performances and educational programmes. The contractor's project description placed conference and VIP spaces on the upper floors and craft workshops in the basement. A separate 2023 proposal called for a museum of architecture, with exhibitions on nineteenth-century architectural styles, Sakakini's life, archival photographs and the architecture of al-Zahir.

== Gallery ==
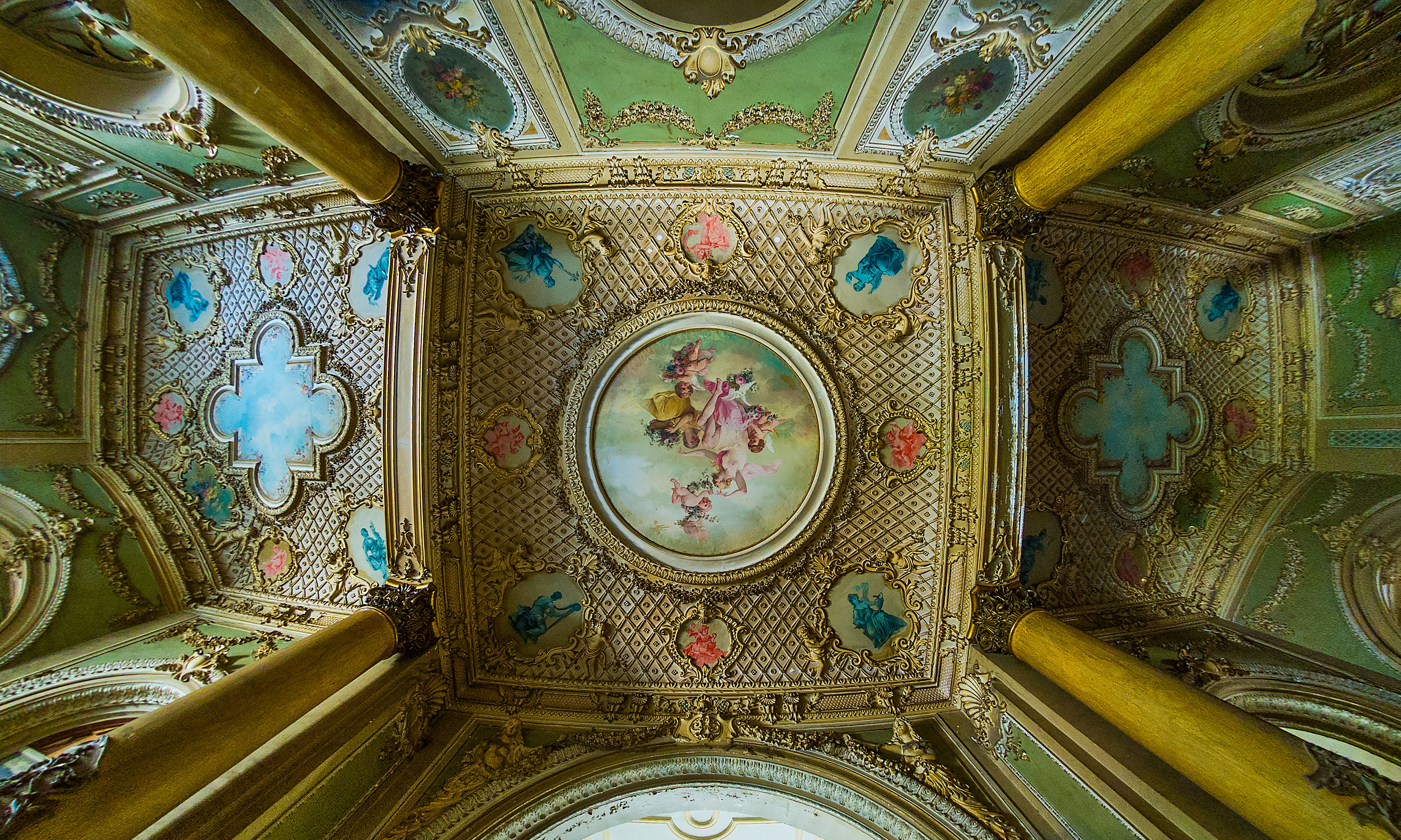
Decoration on top of the ceiling

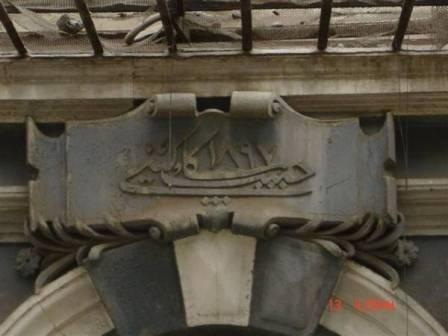
Inscription of Sakakini's name and the year 1897 on the top of the western entrance

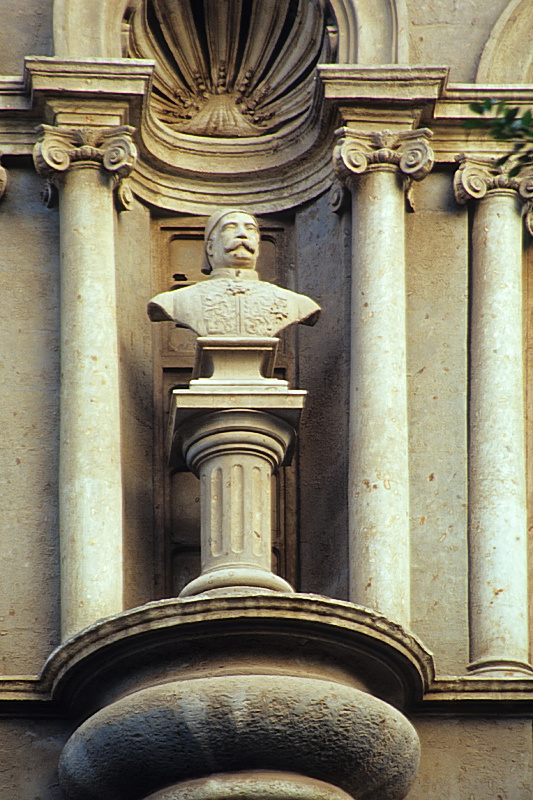
Exterior sculptural decoration

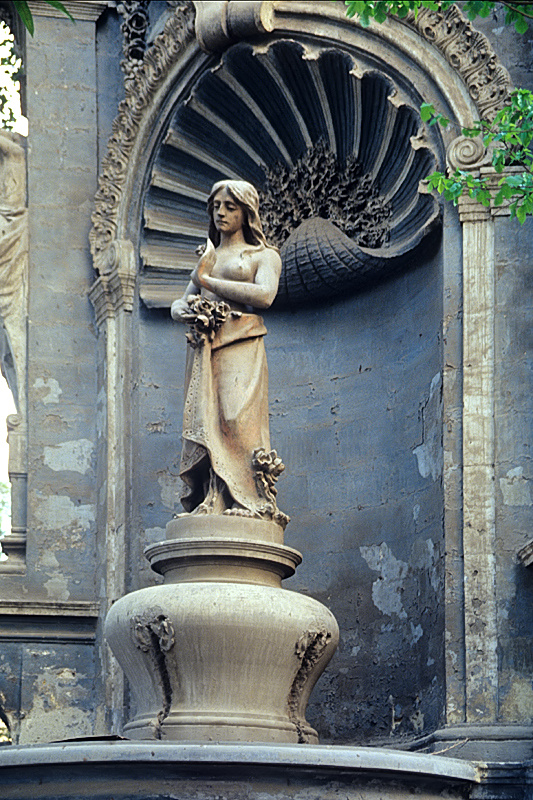
Female figure on the façade

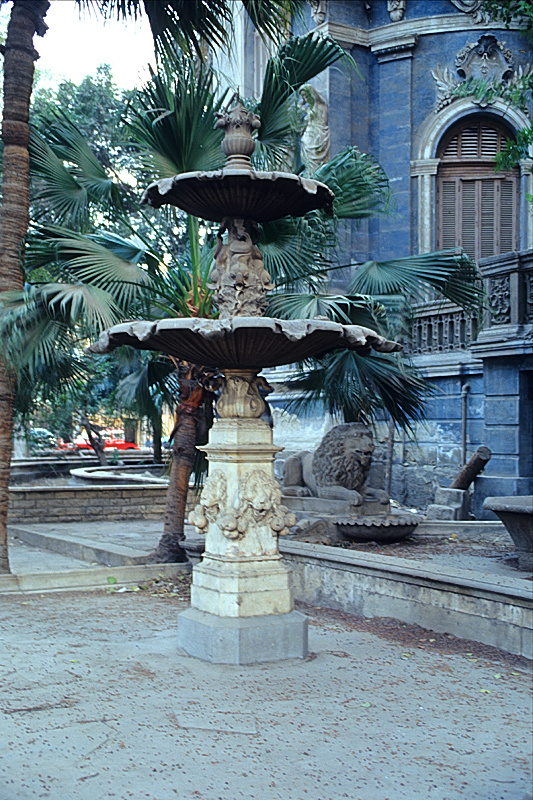
A fountain in the palace's garden

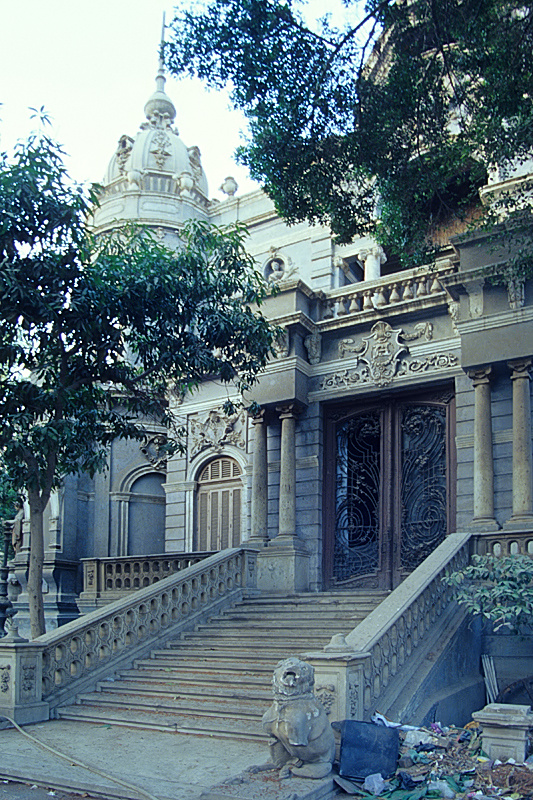
The main entrance of the palace
