= Haïm Capoussi Synagogue =

Former synagogue in Cairo, Egypt

- Hebrew: חיים כפוסי
- Location of the former synagogue, relative to the Nile Delta

Religion
- Affiliation: Judaism (former)
- Rite: Kabbalah
- Ecclesiastical or organizational status: Synagogue

Location
- Location: 3 Darb El Noussayr, Haret El-Yahud, Cairo
- Country: Egypt
- Interactive map of Haïm Capoussi Synagogue
- Coordinates: 30°02′59″N 31°15′31″E

Architecture
- Style: Ottoman architecture
- Completed: 17th century; Early 20th century (restoration)

The Haïm Capoussi Synagogue (Hebrew: חיים כפוסי) is a former Kabbalah Jewish synagogue, located at 3 Darb El Noussayr, in Haret El-Yahud, in the Jewish quarter of Cairo, Egypt.

== History ==
The former synagogue was built in the 17th century in the memory of the Kabbalist rabbi Haim Capoussi of the same period, who studied in Safed under Rabbi Isaac Luria, lived for a time in Cairo, and died in 1631. The Capoussi family were some of the earliest Jews to have been expelled from Spain in AD 1391.

Restored in the early part of the 20th century, both the synagogue and Capoussi's tomb became pilgrimage sites. In March 1986, the former synagogue was registered as an antiquity.

== See also ==
- History of the Jews in Egypt
- Synagogues in Cairo
- List of synagogues in Egypt
