= Al-Rahman al-Rahim Mosque =

Mosque in Cairo, Egypt

- مسجد الرحمن الرحيم
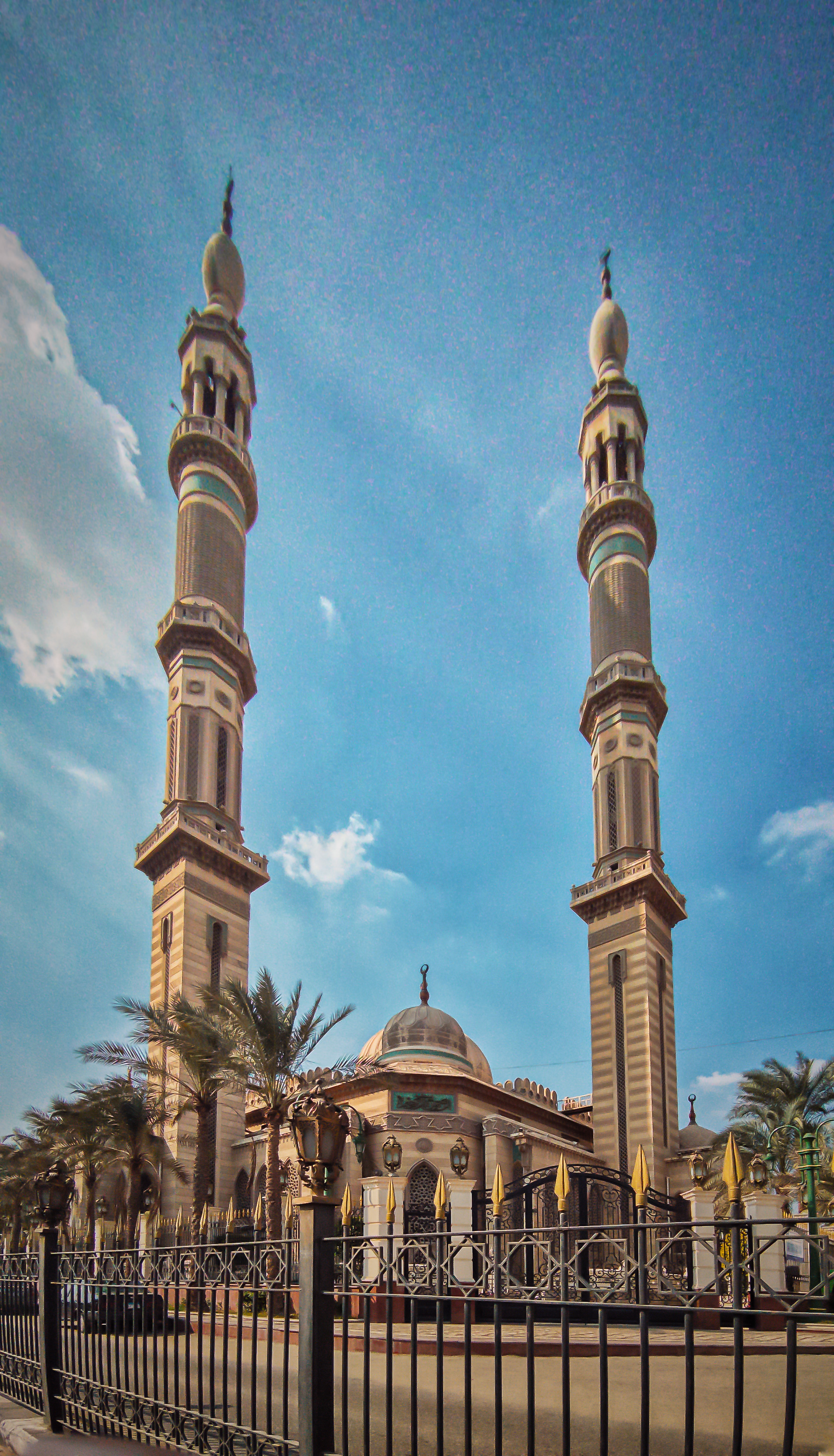
- The mosque in 2015

Religion
- Affiliation: Islam
- Ecclesiastical or organizational status: Mosque
- Status: Active

Location
- Location: Salah Salem, Abbassiya, Cairo
- Country: Egypt
- Interactive map of Al-Rahman al-Rahim Mosque
- Coordinates: 30°03′41″N 31°16′59″E

Architecture
- Architect: Hassan Rashdan Architects
- Type: Mosque architecture
- Style: Islamic
- Completed: 2009

Specifications
- Interior area: 2,300 m^{2} (25,000 sq ft)
- Dome: 1
- Minaret: 2

The Al-Rahman al-Rahim Mosque, also known as the el-Rahman el-Raheem Mosque (Arabic: مسجد الرحمن الرحيم) is a mosque located in the Abbassiya neighbourhood, on Salah Salem Street, in Cairo, Egypt.

== Overview ==
Completed in 2009, the mosque was funded by an Egyptian businessman and is famous for its Islamic motifs from various Islamic architectural styles.

The architectural shape of the mosque was designed so that the outer shape served as a façade of the northern air, so that it would enter from the outer sahn to the mosque, where the windows were used to help rise and exit the hot air. Bathrooms were placed in a location that allowed them to ventilate properly, taking into account the absence of smells inside the mosque. As for the outer space, it was shaded by shade trees so it will be shaded in the summer and warm in the winter. The leaves of these trees fall in the winter and allow the sun to reach and warm the place. The comfortable Earth colors are used to provide comfort and peace of mind to the worshipers.

Many wedding celebrations, known as "Katb Ketab", and high-profile funerals have been held at the mosque since its establishment.

== See also ==
- List of mosques in Egypt
- Islam in Egypt
