= Al-Daher =

District of Cairo, Egypt

Coordinates: 30°04′27″N 31°16′12″E

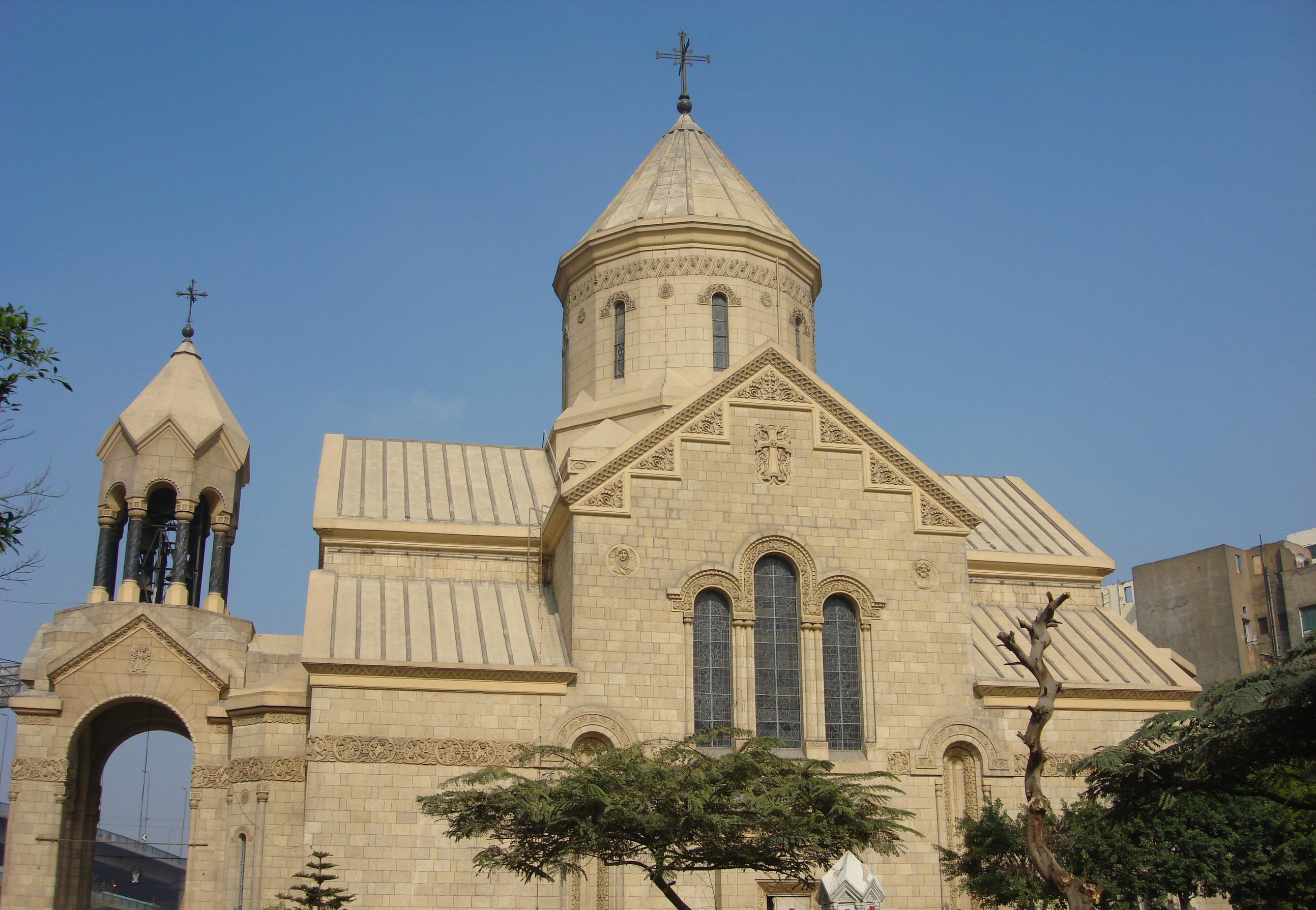
Church of Gregory the Illuminator, an Armenian Catholic church in the district

Al-Daher is a district in the Western Area of Cairo, Egypt. According to the district map (below), and the census, it is subdivided into the qisms (police wards) of al-Wayli and el-Daher, or al-Zahir (Arabic: الظاهر, IPA: [edˈdɑːheɾ, ezˈzˤɑːheɾ]). Some of their better known quarters are Sakakini and Abbassia.

== History ==
The area of al-Zahir was known as the Square of Qaraqush, where it was used as polo grounds by the 12th-century Ayyubid regent Qaraqush, north west of Cairo's walls. After the conquest of Cairo by the Mamluks, the new sultan al-Zahir Baybars built his eponymous mosque over the polo grounds in 1268.

Until the mid-19th century, the area north of the mosque was the rural fringe of Cairo, consisting of the villages of El-Waylia, El-Demerdash, El-Mohamady and the Kobba palace izba (hamlet).

In 1849, Egypt's ruler, Abbass Pasha I, redeveloped the area into the Abbasia neighbourhood. However, by the late 19th century the area was sparsely developed, where the contractor and real estate developer Sakakini Pasha bought a parcel of "swampy mosquito infested" land immediately north of al-Zahir mosque, and built a radial grid development in 1897, with his circular palace placed in the middle of the grid. This area is known today as the Sakakini quarter (shiakha) in qism al-Zahir.

== Administrative subdivisions and population ==
Al-Wayli district is divided into the qisms of al-Zahir and al-Wayli according to the Cairo Governorate district map and the census.

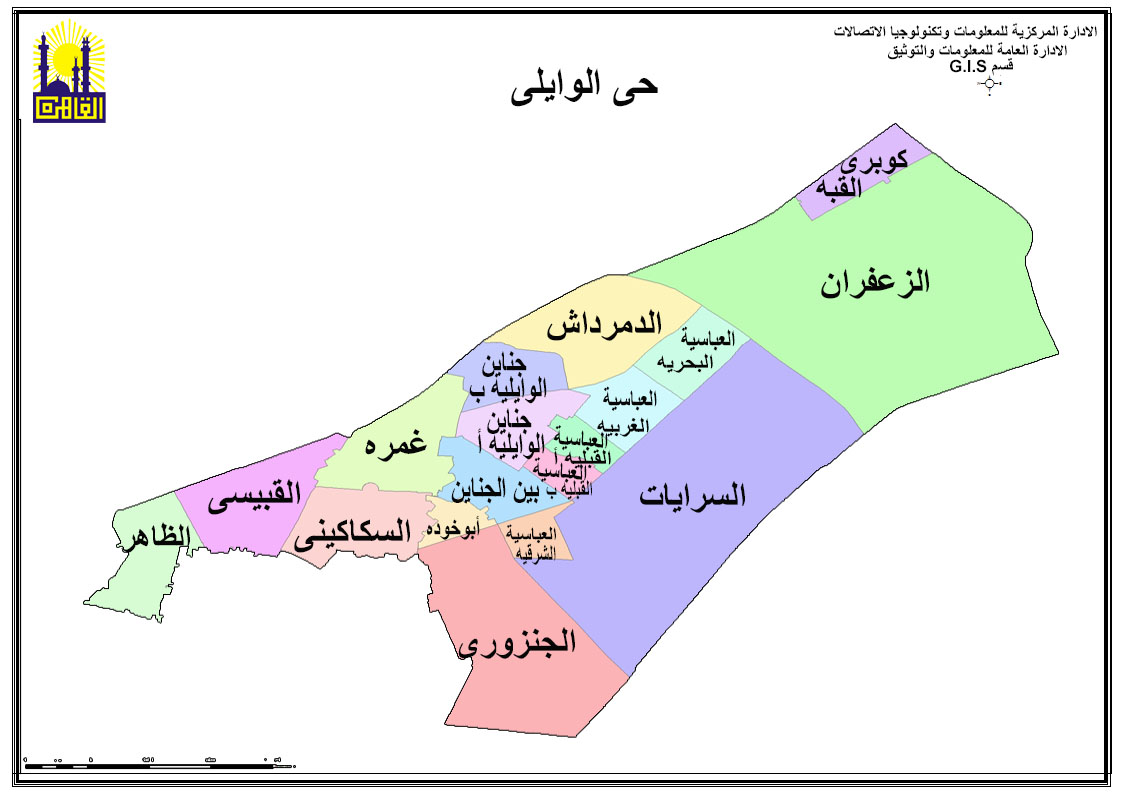
Al-Wayli district map by shiakha

In 2017 qism al-Wayli had 79,292 residents in its 12 shiakhas.

| Shiakha | Code 2017 | Population |
|---|---|---|
| Dimirdâsh, al- | 012401 | 3503 |
| Za`farân, al- | 012402 | 4797 |
| Sarâyât, al- | 012403 | 10513 |
| `Abbâsiyya al-baḥriyya, al- | 012404 | 7424 |
| `Abbâsiyya al-sharqiyya, al- | 012405 | 3512 |
| `Abbâsiyya al-gharbiyya, al- | 012406 | 10170 |
| `Abbâsiyya al-qibliyya A, al- | 012407 | 4857 |
| `Abbâsiyya al-qibliyya B, al- | 012408 | 4228 |
| Bayn al-Janâyin | 012409 | 5758 |
| Janâyyîn al-Wâyliyya A | 012410 | 10911 |
| Janâyyîn al-Wâyliyya B | 012411 | 4732 |
| Kûbrî al-Qubba | 012412 | 8887 |

While qism Al-Zahir had 71,870 residents in its six shiakhas in 2017.

| Shiakha | Code 2017 | Population |
|---|---|---|
| Abû Khûda | 012301 | 4792 |
| Janzûrî, al- | 012302 | 10803 |
| Sakâkînî, al- | 012303 | 16239 |
| Ẓâhir, al- | 012304 | 10234 |
| Qubaysî, al- | 012305 | 13517 |
| Ghamra | 012306 | 16285 |
