= Al-Nour Mosque (Cairo) =

Mosque in Abbassia, Cairo, Egypt

- مسجد النور
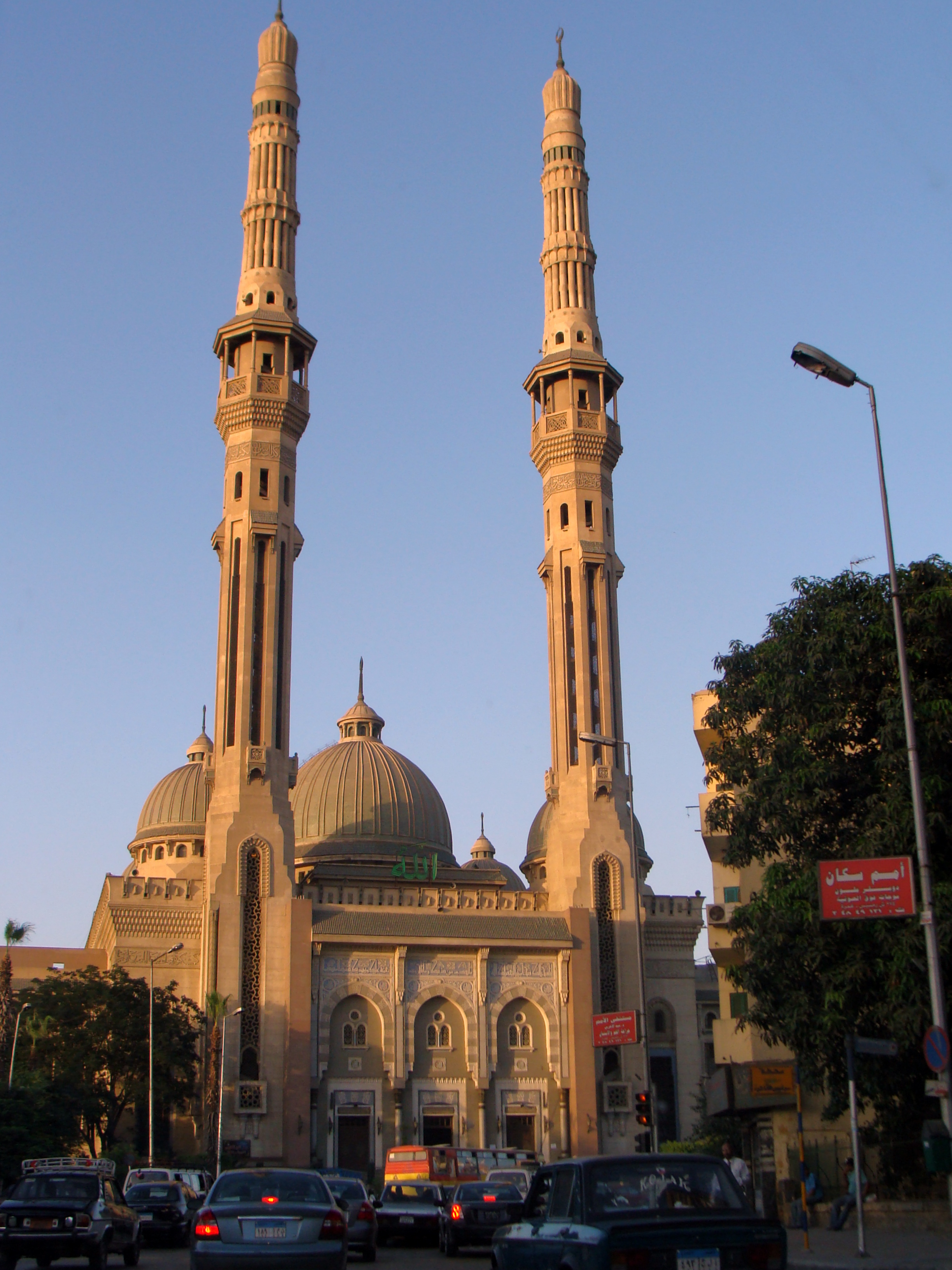
- The mosque in 2009

- Location within Nile Delta

Religion
- Affiliation: Islam
- Ecclesiastical or organizational status: Mosque
- Status: Active

Location
- Location: Abbassia, Cairo
- Country: Egypt
- Interactive map of Al-Nour Mosque
- Coordinates: 30°04′31″N 31°16′59″E

Architecture
- Type: Mosque architecture
- Style: Islamic
- General contractor: Arab Contractors

Specifications
- Interior area: 5,000 m^{2} (54,000 sq ft)
- Dome: Four (maybe more)
- Dome height (outer): 55 m (180 ft)
- Minaret: Two

The Al-Nour Mosque (Arabic: مسجد النور) is a mosque in Abbassia, Cairo, Egypt. It is among the landmarks of the neighborhood and the largest mosques in the city with several different halls for multi-purposes. It conducts social activities and sporting events as well. The mosque contains other facilities such as library.

== History ==
The mosque was built during the presidency of Anwar Sadat on the land provided to the Salafi organization Al-Hidayatul Islamiya, led by Sheikh Hafiz Salama. Although the mosque has been under the supervision of the Ministry of Awqaf, Salama has been contesting and protesting this in order to acquire the full entitlement of the mosque.

=== Arab Spring ===
During the Arab Spring, the mosque was heavily guarded by the police in accordance with the policy of the Ministry of Interior which forbid the gathering of the demonstration in front of the major mosques and churches. However, some Salafi groups had organized the demonstration on the way to the mosque, protesting the high cost the former president Hosni Mubarak had charged to the mosque.

== Architecture ==
The mosque was constructed by the Egyptian construction company Arab Contractors. According to their website, it has an area size of 5,000 m^{2} (54,000 sq ft) and the dome height reaches 55 m (180 ft). The mosque contains several rooms for various purposes, including rooms for the international conference, guesthouses, and medical clinics. It also hosts the center for Qur'anic memorization and workshops for arts and handicrafts.

== See also ==
- List of mosques in Egypt
- Islam in Egypt
