= Mosque of al-Zahir Baybars =

Mosque in Cairo, Egypt

- مسجد الظاهر بيبرس
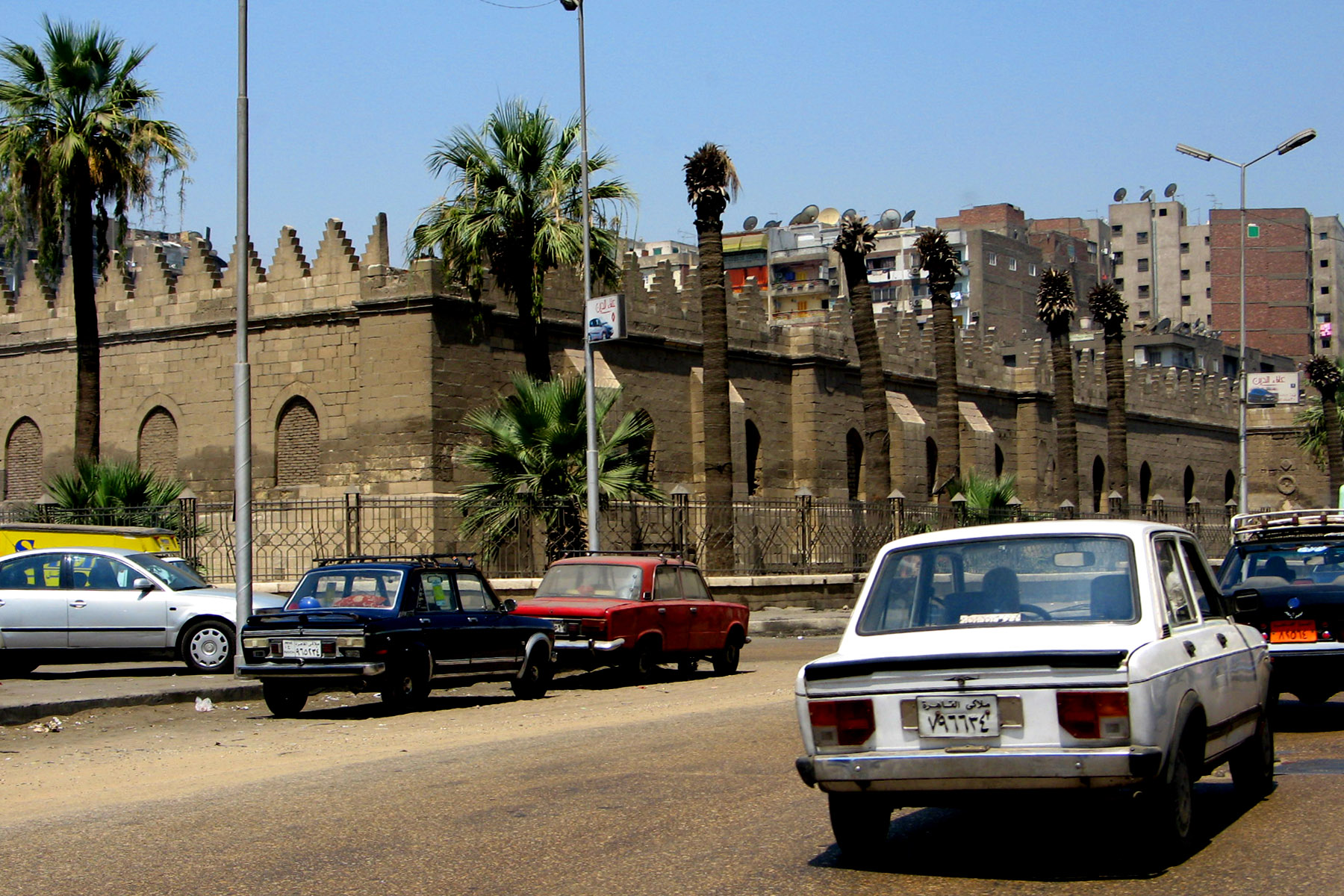

Religion
- Affiliation: Islam
- Ecclesiastical or organisational status: Mosque (current); Profane use (historical)
- Status: Active

Location
- Location: El Sakakeni, El-Zaher Square, Islamic Cairo
- Country: Egypt
- Interactive map of Mosque of al-Zahir Baybars
- Coordinates: 30°03′44″N 31°15′48″E

Architecture
- Type: Mosque
- Style: Mamluk
- Completed: 1268 (original); 2023 (restoration)

Specifications
- Height (max): 12 m (39 ft)
- Site area: 10,000 m^{2} (110,000 sq ft)

The Mosque of al-Zahir Baybars (Arabic: مسجد الظاهر بيبرس) is a mosque located in Islamic Cairo, Egypt. It was completed in 1268 CE, by the Mamluk Sultan al-Zahir Baybars al-Bunduqdari (r. 1260–1277) through his vizier Bahaa el-Din bin Hanna and Sanjar al-Shuja‘i.

== History ==
Sultan al-Zahir Baybars al-Bunduqdari was an influential leader and established a strong foundation for Mamluk rule in Egypt. He was a successful statesman and warrior, united Syria and the Hijaz with Egypt, conquered important lands from the Crusaders, raided Little Armenia, and expanded Mamluk rule to Nubian territory. Ruling from 1260–1277, Baybars instituted many reforms, infrastructure projects, and pious foundations that created the groundwork for the Mamluk state. In addition to his madrassa, Baybars had two mosques built in his name, the mosque at Husayniyya, and another larger mosque built in rural, southern Cairo in 1273, of which nothing remains. In 1267, four years after the construction of Baybars's Madrassa in the middle of the old Fatimid city, he began construction on the mosque at Husayniyya, an area remote from urban life in the northern edge of Cairo. The mosque, which took a year and a half to finish and cost one million dirhams, was the first mosque of the Mamluk period and the first Friday mosque to be built in Cairo in a hundred years.

Although the mosque site is remote, the mosque demonstrates the pious nature of Baybars, as he sacrificed the land of his own Polo grounds and chose a space close to the zawiya, or religious school, of Shaykh Khidr, Baybars's controversial patron saint. The generosity of both mosques and the land around them were important aspects of the economics of medieval Egypt. Establishing public charitable services and buildings was an important mechanism through which rulers and wealthy elites provided for citizens, promoting loyalty to the ruling regime. In addition, it was a way for new dynasties to establish their rule, creating new city centers with large buildings, and for leaders to demonstrate their political and religious power. The story, site, and architecture of this mosque are thus all significant to Baybars's reputation as both a successful military leader and a pious ruler.

In later centuries the mosque has been abandoned and re-used for a variety of purposes. During Napoleon's occupation of Egypt (1798-1801) it was used as a military fort and headquarters, called Fort Sulkowski. It was then used as a barracks for a Senegalese community in the time of Muhammad Ali (first half of the 19th century). Later it was used as a soap factory and a bakery. During the British occupation it was used as an army warehouse and then an abattoir. Under King Fuad it was converted into a public garden. The mosque remained abandoned and disused until a major government-led restoration project on the mosque started in 2007. The mosque reopened in 2023.

== Architecture ==
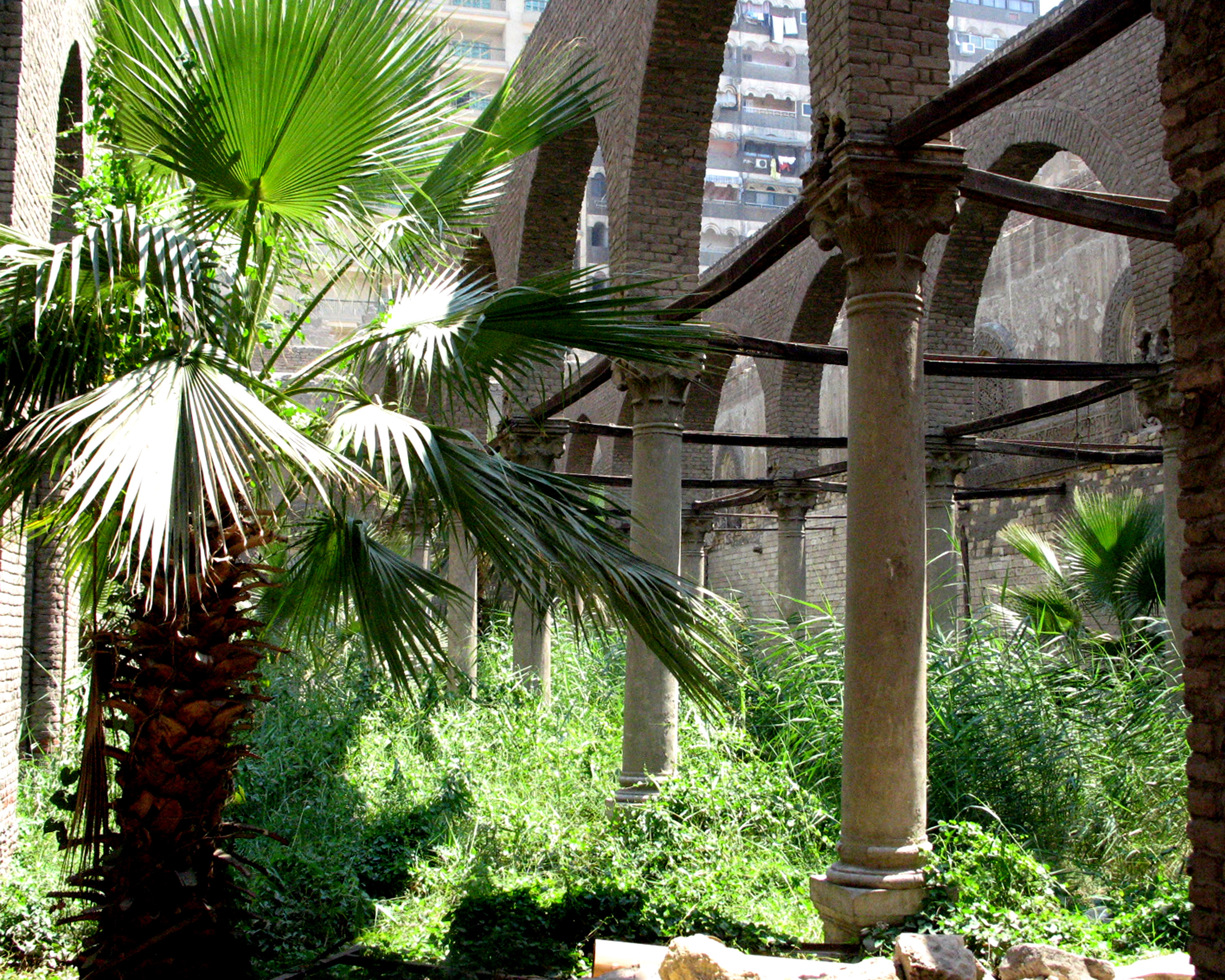
Hypostyle interior of the mosque (abandoned) in 2006

This is a square shaped, hypostyle mosque, meaning it is a flat roofed structure supported by columns. The mosque lacks most of its defining features, including its dome, minarets, roof, and most decoration; but at over 10,000 square metres (110,000 sq ft) and 12 metres (39 ft) tall, the impression of its grandeur remains. The mosque has three protruding entrances, the largest of which is on the western wall; the western and eastern aisles both have three colonnades; the south has six, and the north, two. Because of the mosque's location in the northwest of the city, it has its back to Cairo and any visitors that come from the city. Even from behind, however, the mosque was recognizable by its large wooden dome in front of the mihrab (the niche in the middle of the qibla wall marking the direction of Mecca). Each entrance was topped with a minaret, meaning Baybars's mosque had one minaret more than the mosque of al-Hakim. Reportedly, Baybars wanted the portals to the mosque to resemble his madrassa, however they lack the same architecture or decoration, instead also resembling more closely the mosque of al-Hakim as well. Large pointed arches create the walls for the Mosque's courtyard while they also provided the support for the dome, which was the first of its kind to be built anywhere in Egypt.

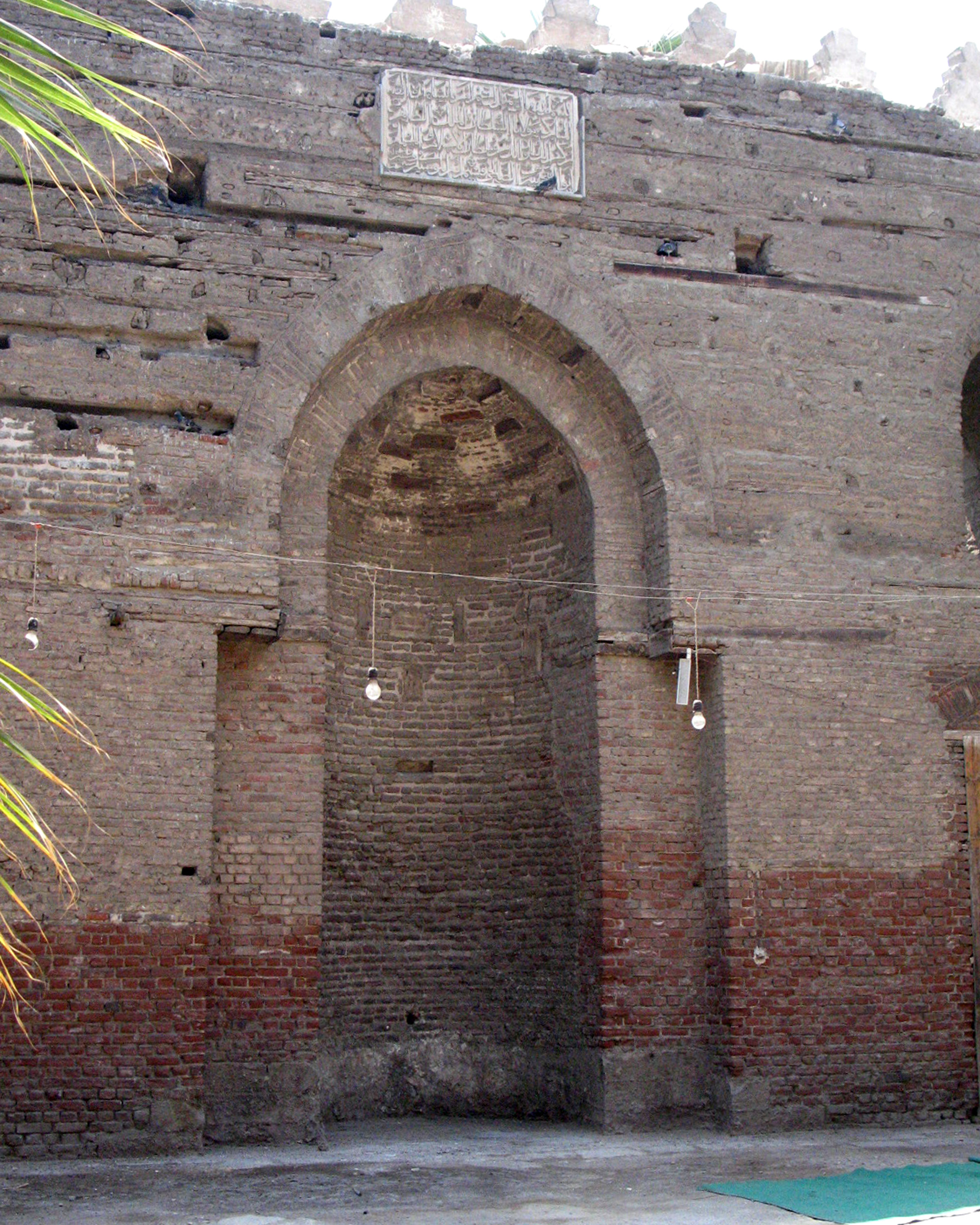
Mihrab in the qibla wall

The mosque's maqsura is an enclosed area in front of the mihrab reserved for the monarch, and so is especially large under the dome, "almost like an autonomous sanctuary within the mosque." The dome was painted, and the qibla wall was decorated as well with marble and glass mosaics representing trees and other greenery. This mosque is the first example of the use of ablaq in Cairo, a striped pattern seen here in stone, which later became a popular decoration for Mamluk architecture throughout the city. Instead of running around the entire exterior, inscriptions on the exterior of the mosque are carved in tablets placed above the mihrab and entrances. While the exterior of the mosque is made up of stone, the interior is decorated with carved stucco, including stucco grilles in arched windows in the upper wall, and a band of Kufic script that does run around the entire interior.

Although it was not common for the Mamluks to associate buildings with specific religious or historical occurrences, the original dome did incorporate "spoils from a crusader fortress" to celebrate a victory of Islam and help the new Mamluk rule to establish religious legitimacy. This legitimacy was also created by using themes from other historical pious buildings and regimes; the keel arches, for example, as well as the portal facades, are Fatimid building traditions. The minarets were made of light brick, as was traditional in the early Mamluk period, and were probably similar to the minarets of Zawiyat al-Humud. The stone carvings are reminiscent of al-Hakim's mosque, al-Aqmar mosque, and other known madrasas and mausoleums. In general, besides the dome, this mosque is very much in the "Cairene tradition," with many strong references to al-Hakim's mosque. By using these recognized structures, Baybars demonstrated a commitment to religious ideology and high moral authority, showing his power and piety. By incorporating elements from conquered buildings, Baybars also celebrated his triumphs, and indeed his greatness can still be seen in the remains of his mosque in the outskirts of Cairo today.

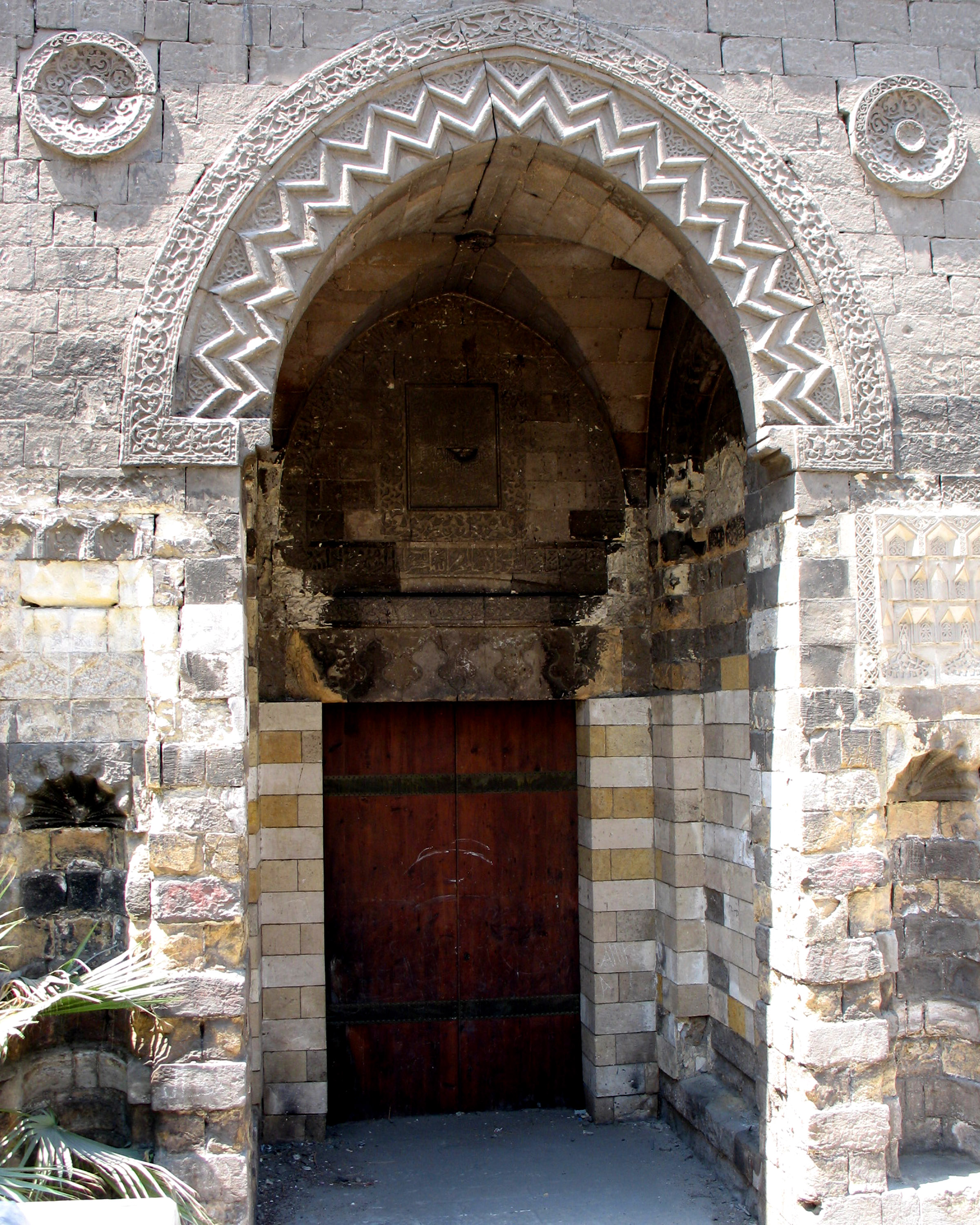
Northeast entrance portal, with ablaq masonry, in 2006

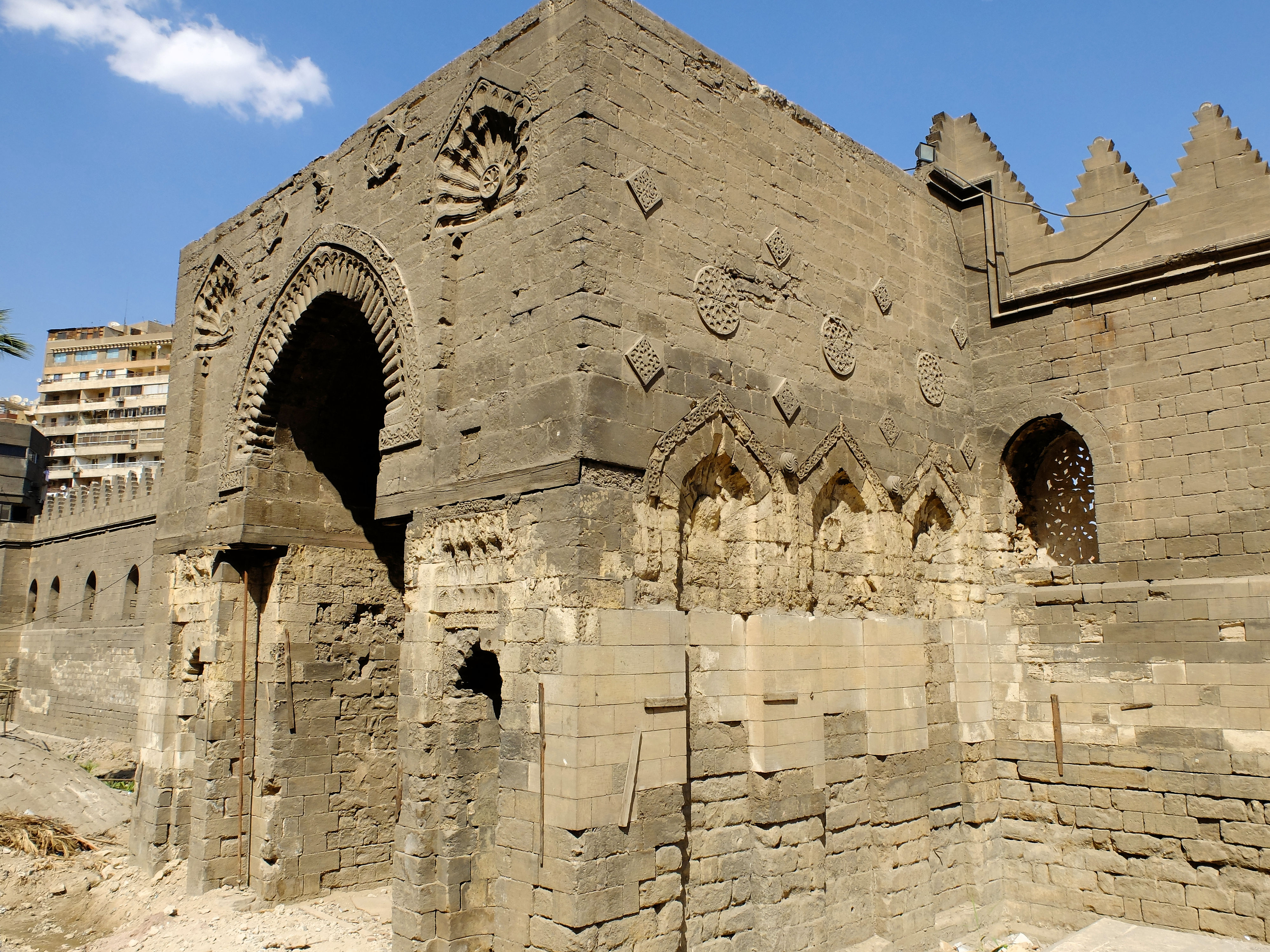
Northwest entrance portal, with Fatimid keel-arch motifs, in 2019

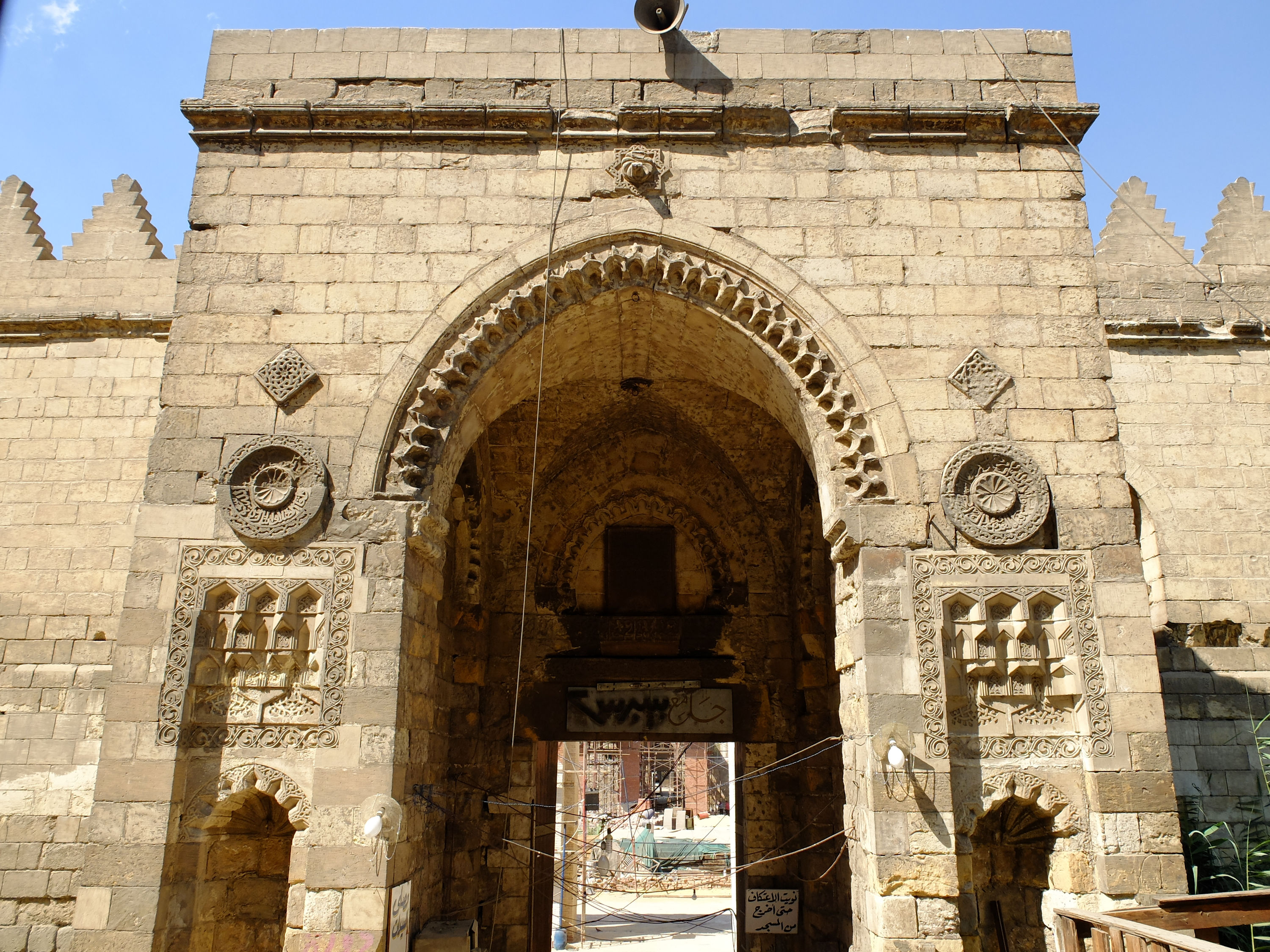
Southwest entrance portal, in 2019

== Al-Maqrizi's commentary ==
As one of the most influential ancient Egyptian historians, al-Maqrizi’s Khitat dominates scholarly discourse on the architecture and structure of Medieval Egypt even today, six hundred years after he wrote it. Maqrizi not only describes the physical buildings of Cairo in great detail, he gives a picture of the entire construction; explaining materials, difficulties, changes in plans, and connecting these elements to greater economic, social, religious, and historical contexts of his time.

On this particular mosque, Maqrizi describes how Baybars chose the area for the mosque, originally rejecting a resting spot for camels, and after much deliberation decided instead on the Square of Qaraqush, where he played polo. Maqrizi goes on to describe the building plans and resources for the mosque, stating the Sultan ordered for “marble columns from throughout the entire country. He wrote to bring camels, water buffalo, cows, and donkeys from every district. He also wrote to bring tools of iron and wood to carve entrances, ceilings, and other such things.” Perhaps most importantly, however, Maqrizi connects the building of the mosque to the destruction of the Jaffa citadel, thus creating the context in which Baybars is attempting to demonstrate his own power by deconstructing the old regime. Maqrizi says Baybars, “took for himself all the wood from the citadel along with any panels of marble that were found inside it” and ordered the materials be used in his own mosque. In this way, Baybars ensured his own lasting pious foundation and demonstrated the religious and political authority of the Mamluks. Maqrizi also notes the actions of Baybars throughout the building of the Mosque; he travels to Syria, conquers Yaffa (Jaffa), Tripoli, and Antakiyya (Antioch), and finally returns to oversee his building project completed. In this way, Maqrizi demonstrates how buildings are placeholders for people and stories that really make up Egyptian history. Mosques, always a work in progress, even after they are completed, are defined by the individuals surrounding them more than by their architecture. When the mosque was completed, Baybars was pleased with its magnificence and donated the land around the mosque as a “pious endowment,” or waqf, that would generate income for the building. The waqf system was an important component of not only Mamluk patronage, but the Islamic city more generally, where wealthy, powerful individuals maintained their status by giving to the community. Thus, Maqrizi’s text, explains more than the historical details about al-Zahir Baybars’ mosque, but also gives a broader view into understanding the context in which the building was actively used.

== Restoration ==
The mosque, which had been abandoned and partly ruined for years, has been undergoing a major restoration that started in 2007. The mosque, whose roof was gone and whose interior was exposed to the elements, was cleared of plants and vegetation. The first phase, completed in 2008, consolidated the foundations of the mosque and stopped the seepage of underground water into the structure. In 2011 restoration work was paused, either because of the ongoing Egyptian revolution or because of problems discovered in the materials used for reconstruction. Work resumed in 2018. The second phase involved the paving of the mosque's floors and the reconstruction of its roof, dome, and minaret. The last phase was to restore its decoration and will reconstitute its minbar (pulpit), whose remaining pieces had been kept in storage. The budget of the restoration works was E£100 million, paid for by the Egyptian government and the government of Kazakhstan (where, according to some, Baybars was born).

On June 4, 2023, the mosque was reopened during a ceremony attended by both Egyptian and Kazakh officials.

== See also ==
- Islam in Egypt
- List of mosques in Cairo
- List of mosques in Egypt
