= Abbassia =

Neighbourhood in Cairo, Egypt

El Abbassia العباسية
- District
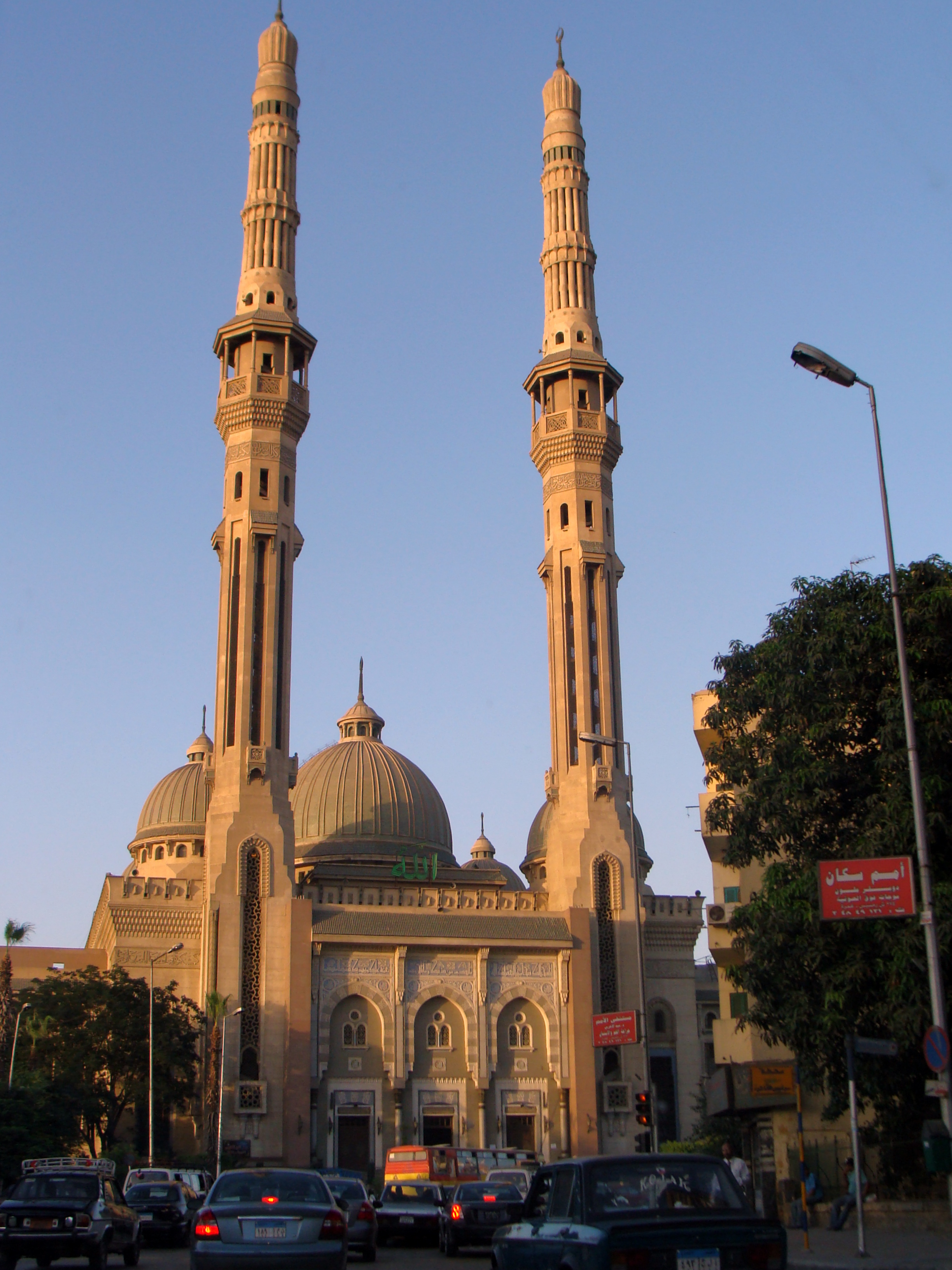
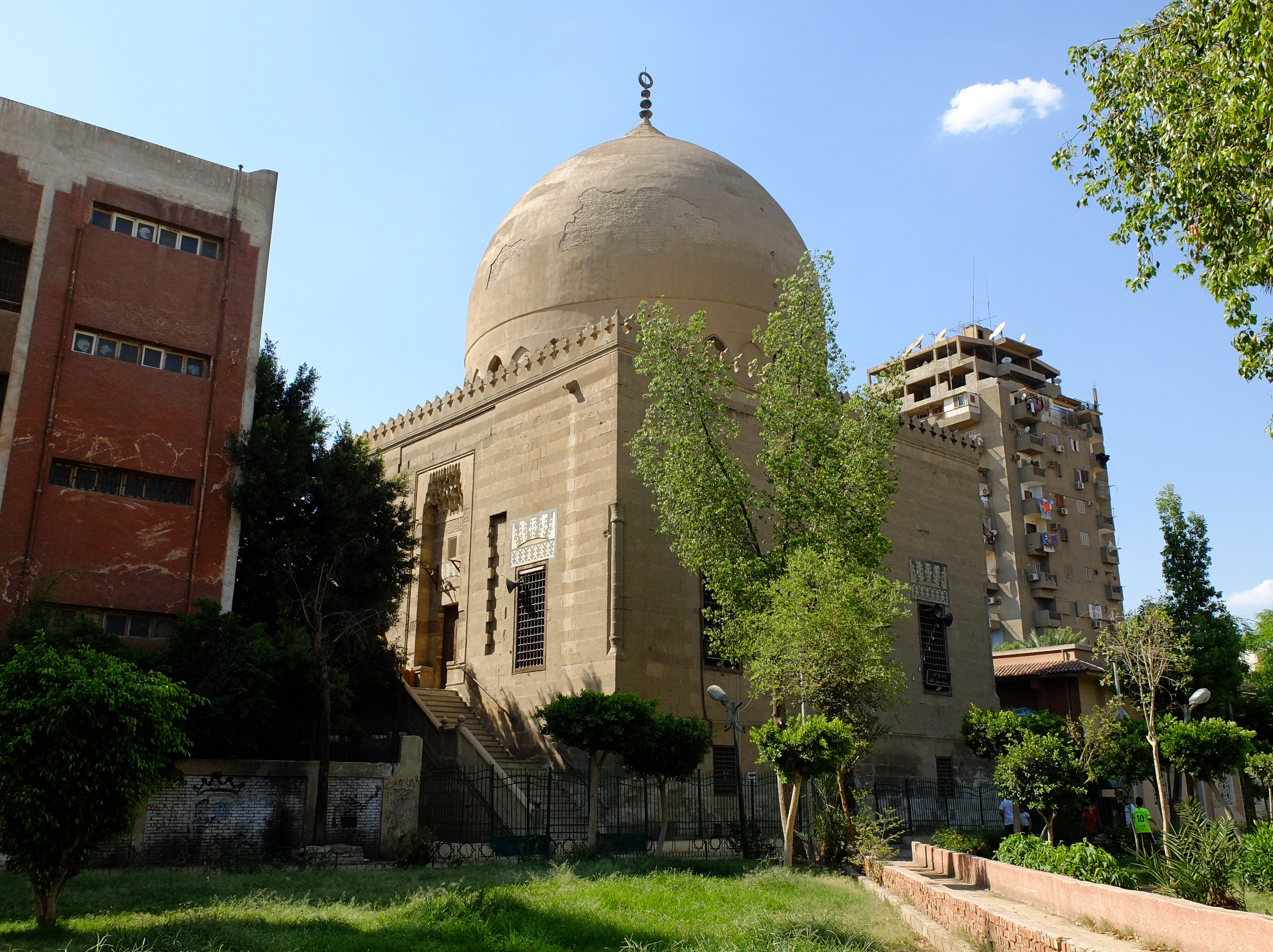
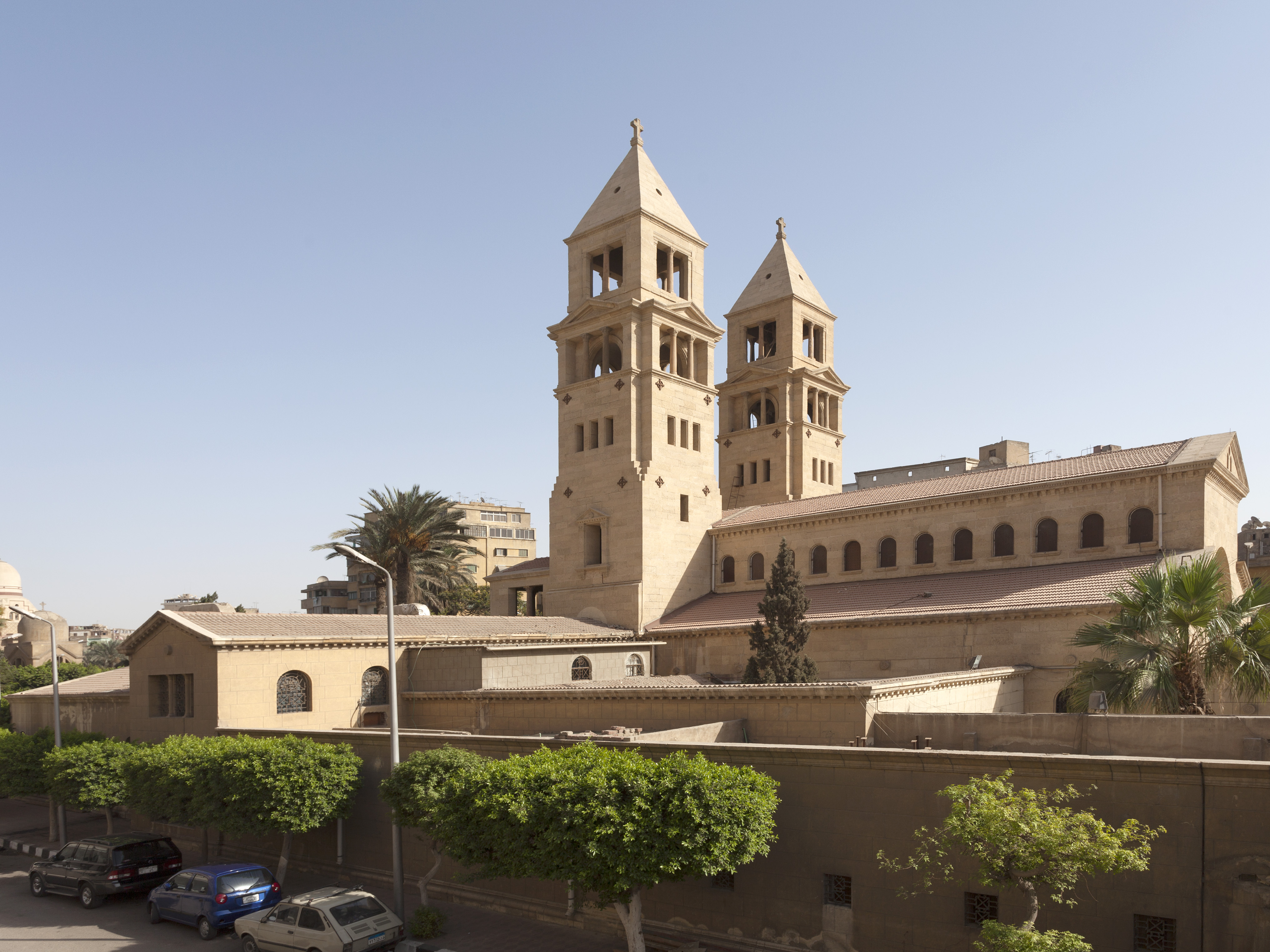
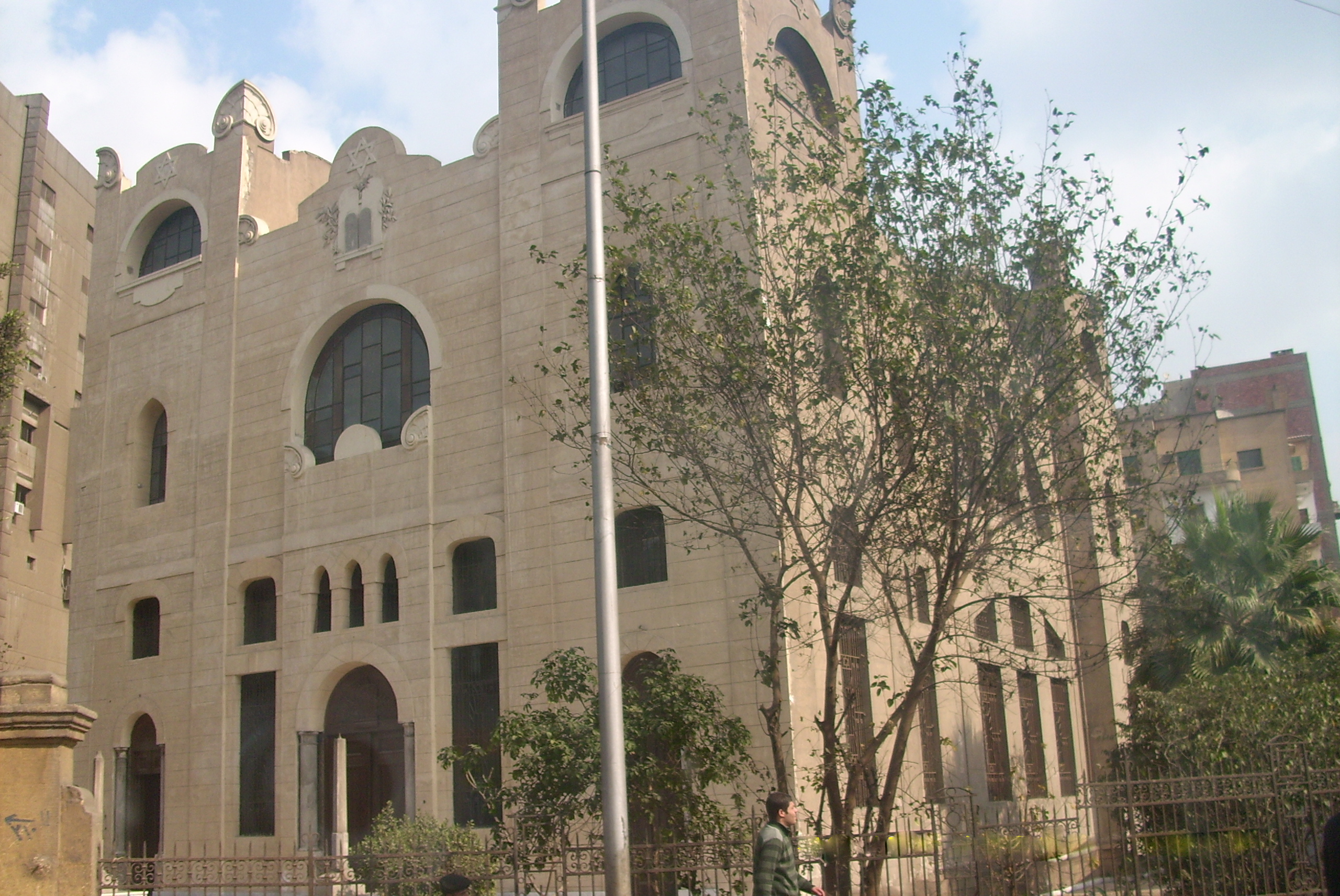
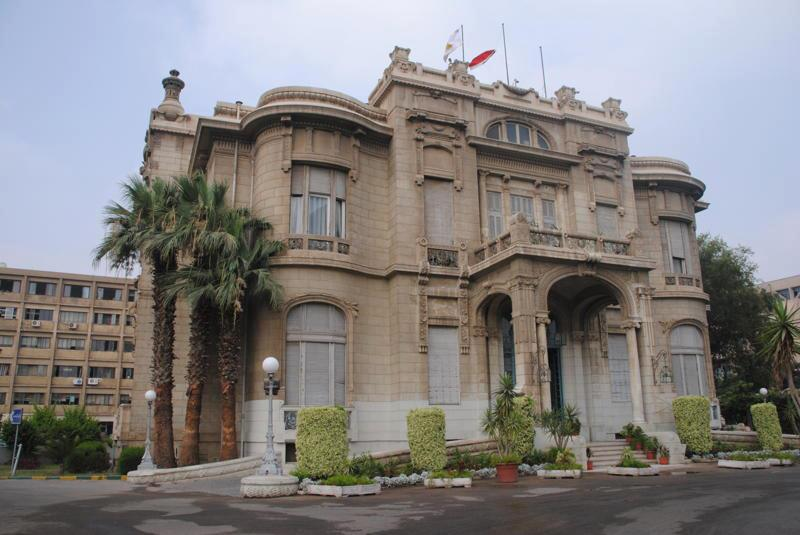
- Clockwise: Al Nour Mosque, St. Peter's Church, Zaafaranah Palace, Karaite Jewish Temple, Qubba al-Fadawiyya

- Location in Egypt
- Coordinates: 30.065008°N 31.27171°E
- Country: Egypt
- Governorate: Cairo Governorate
- Time zone: UTC+2 (EET)
  - Summer (DST): UTC+3 (EEST)

El Abbassia (Arabic: العباسية Egyptian Arabic pronunciation: [elʕæb.bæˈsej.jæ]) is a neighbourhood that makes up five shiakhas (census blocks) in al-Wayli district in Cairo, Egypt.

The Saint Mark's Coptic Orthodox Cathedral is located in Abbassia, as are the medical faculty of Ain Shams University and its affiliate hospital units. The Abbassia metro station is located there as well.

== History ==
The modern district of Abbassia is named after Abbas Helmy Pasha and was built upon an older Coptic village called p-Sovt em-p-Hoi (Coptic: ⲡⲥⲟⲃⲧ ⲙ̀ⲡϩⲟⲓ Coptic pronunciation: [psoβt əmˈphoj] "the wall of the moat") and later Shats (Coptic: ϣⲁⲧⲥ "the moat"), which is a calque on the latter Arabic al-Khandaq (Arabic: الخندق "the moat").

In 1865 an observatory, principally for meteorological work, was founded at Abbassia, by the Khedive Isma'il Pasha and maintained continuously there for nearly forty years. The building lay on the boundary between the cultivated Nile Delta and the desert, but then with urban encroachment, it was decided in 1904 to move the meteorological work to Helwan. The observatory at Abbassia was an empty monument until 1952.

Abbassia and the nearby region saw heavy rainfall during a period of time geological researchers call the Pluvial Abbassia. During this period, red, green and purple rocks or gravel became distributed all along the valley and Delta regions of the Nile. Gravel beds were formed, including a famous gravel bed at Abbassia. Photographed and described in 1926 by Paul Bovier-Lapierre, these gravel beds were as thick as 33 feet (10 metres/meters) in some areas.

In the Second World War, during which Egypt was the scene of heavy fighting, the United Kingdom located its Royal Armoured Corps School in Abbassia. In September 1941, an Italian Air Force plane bombed a British Army depot in Abbassia.

The Cathedral of Saint Mark in Abbassia was the site of the 2012 funeral for Coptic Pope Shenouda III of Alexandria, attracting more than two million mourners from around the world. A queue of over one kilometer in length formed to view the body of the pope, and as people pushed to get close, three people were crushed to death, and 137 were injured.

During the continued 2012 protests of the Egyptian Revolution of 2011, Abbassia was the scene of confrontations between protesters and armed gangs. On December 11, 2016 a chapel next to the Saint Mark's Coptic Orthodox Cathedral was the site of a suicide bombing against Egypt's Coptic community. Of the 25 Copts who died in the explosion, most were women and children. The army was deployed to the site, and Egypt began three days of mourning.

== See also ==
- Police Academy Stadium
- Al-Rahman Al-Rahim Mosque
