= Levantines in Egypt =

Ethnic minority group in Egypt

Syro-Lebanese in Egypt شوام مصر
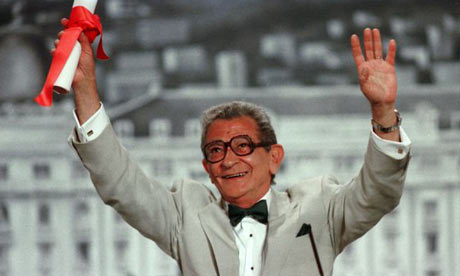
- Youssef Chahine, Egyptian filmmaker and director of Lebanese ancestry

Languages
- Arabic, French

Religion
- Christianity: Eastern Catholic (Melkite, Maronite), Eastern Orthodox (Antioch and Alexandria), Protestant; Minority: Islam

Related ethnic groups
- Greeks in Egypt, Armenians in Egypt, Italians in Egypt, Maltese in Egypt

The Levantines in Egypt (Egyptian Arabic: شوام مصر, romanized: Shawām Maṣr), also known as the Syro-Lebanese in Egypt (French: Syro-Libanais d'Égypte), are an ethnic minority group in Egypt. They are Egyptians who have ancestry originating from the Levant, mostly what is now Syria and Lebanon, but also including Palestine and Jordan. The majority of Egypt's historic Levantine community is of the Christian faith, mainly Eastern Catholic (Melkite and Maronite) and Eastern Orthodox (originally Antiochian and later the Alexandrian patriarchate).

Due to the rise in nationalism along with the loss of economic freedoms during the 1950s, a significant portion of Egypt's Levantine community left the country immigrating to the Americas, Europe, and Australia, as well as many returning to their native Lebanon (especially Beirut) and Syria.

Since antiquity, there has always been a Levantine presence in Egypt, however, they started becoming a distinctive minority in Egypt around the early 18th century. The majority of Syro-Lebanese migrants who arrived in Egypt during this time were French-speaking and highly influenced by European Culture. By the dawn of the 20th century, the Syro-Lebanese of Egypt were considered a powerful and cosmopolitan community that played an important role in both Egypt's economy and culture.

== History ==
The relations between Egypt and the Levant go back to ancient times. However, the earliest instance of modern Levantine migration to Egypt happened after 1724, when a schism in the Greek Orthodox Church of Antioch resulted in a separate branch of Levantine Christians attached to Rome known as the Melkite Greek Catholics. Once the Syrian and Lebanese Greek Orthodox community was split, a migratory flow resulted in which Melkite Greek Catholics began leaving cities such as Damascus, Aleppo, Zahle, and Sidon to move to Egypt. Regarding an early Maronite presence in Egypt dating from the 18th century, it is said that the Holy see of Rome appointed two Maronite priests to serve as advisers to the Franciscans who came from the Custody of the Holy Land to evangelize Egypt because "no one knows the land and mentality of the Coptic Christians like the Maronites".

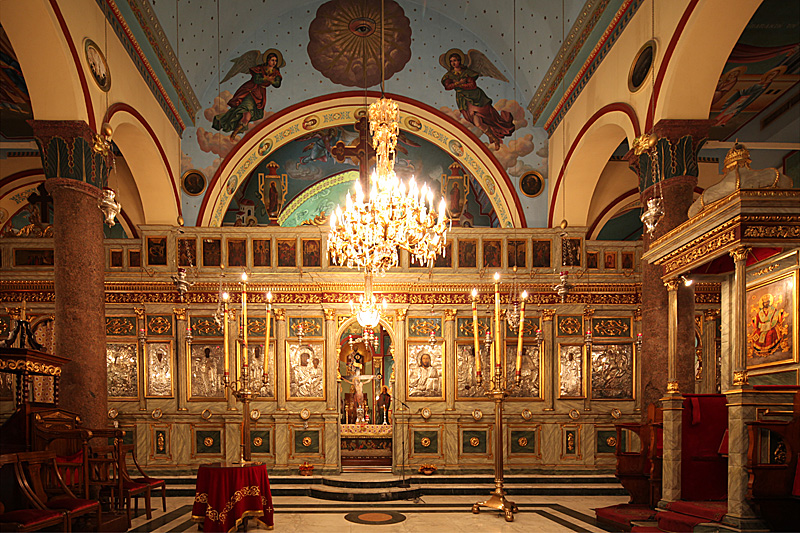
Iconostasis of the Greek Orthodox Church of St. Sabbas, Alexandria, Egypt

Later during the mid-1800s, due to the political conflict that existed in Lebanon and Syria between the Christian and Druze religious sects, many Syrian and Lebanese Christians, as well as Palestinian and Jordanian Christians to some extent, migrated to Egypt under the rule of Muhammad Ali Pasha. These Syro-Lebanese or Levantine Christians, known in Egyptian Arabic as the "Shawam", were either of Greek Orthodox or Catholic (Melkite or Maronite) extraction. The reason immigrants from Lebanon and Syria were considered one ethnic group was because during the mid-1800s, Lebanon was not yet an independent state and was still part of Ottoman Syria, or "Bilad al-Sham" in Arabic, hence their label as "Shawam" or "Shami". Muhammad Ali Pasha endorsed various ethnic and religious groups, including Syro-Lebanese, Greeks, Armenians, Jews, Italians, and Maltese to settle in Egypt.

From the building of the Suez Canal to the creation of modern Downtown Cairo, Egypt's rulers went on a spending spree that attracted migrants from across the world. The Syro-Lebanese, who first migrated were French-speaking and well-educated (largely due to European and American missionaries), had a mindset in the British-run economy of Egypt at the time. As a result, they were able to flourish as an energetic and cosmopolitan community until the Nasser era of the mid-1950s, that adopted an Arabization mind set for the entire region. Most of the Syro-Lebanese were self-employed businessmen or craftsmen and had more of a "Westernized" education than others. Robert Solé, a French author of Levantine-Egyptian descent, describes all of these aspects of the Syro-Lebanese community in Egypt in his book, "Birds of Passage", as well as in his other publications.

The Syro-Lebanese established Melkite Greek-Catholic and Maronite Catholic churches throughout many areas of Egypt such as Cairo, Alexandria, Mansoura, Suez, Port Said, and Tanta. The Greek Orthodox Syro-Lebanese experienced conflict trying to establish their own churches under their native Antiochian denomination, and became under the jurisdiction of the Greek Orthodox Church of Alexandria, which was mainly run by an ethnic Greek clergy.

In Egypt, many families of Syro-Lebanese origin became successful in Egypt's business sector along with the established Armenian and Greek communities. Many were involved in Egypt's booming cotton industry. The famous Egyptian newspaper, "Al-Ahram", was created by the Lebanese Takla family in Egypt.

Syro-Lebanese families dominated the publishing industry, owning major printing houses like Dar al-Hilal (est. 1892), which gave them enormous influence on the country's cultural life. Even Rose al-Yusuf, the quintessential Egyptian cultural figure from the first half of the twentieth century, was originally Levantine of Turkish descent. The (then) irreverent political and literary magazine she founded and named after herself continues to this day, albeit in state hands like Al-Ahram.

Even the material culture of Cairo has been influenced by Syro-Lebanese culture. The most prolific architect in Central Cairo between the 1930s and 1960s was Antoine Selim Nahas, who is considered one of Egypt's modernist architects. Nahas, who designed, among other notable buildings, the Beirut National Museum, established a successful architectural practice in Cairo, where he designed buildings for prominent clients, including Levantine-Egyptians such as the actor Farid al-Atrash.

Even though the number of Levantine-Egyptians still in Egypt is drastically low today, the Syro-Lebanese community retains its strength in some aspects of the cultural and entertainment industries. Cairo's most famous restaurant entrepreneur, Nisha Sursock, comes from a prominent Beirut Greek Orthodox family.

The Levantine community in Egypt counted more than 100,000 members at the turn of the 20th century: civil servants, hairdressers, cobblers, drivers, engineers, dentists, doctors, shopkeepers, painters. Their aggregate wealth was reckoned at one and a half billion francs, that is 10% of the Egyptian GDP. Those who had capital invested it in small businesses (oil, soaps, tobacco, patisserie). Others created more important companies trading or producing salt, sodium, textiles, perfume, wood, silk. This economic success led to the foundation of schools, clubs, and charities, generally linked to a place of worship which was most of the time a church. A minority returned to their home village but the majority remained "semi-detached", settling for several generations in Egypt without for all that involving themselves fully in the host society.

In Mansoura, a city that used to be under huge French and European influence. The Levantines excelled equally as lawyers, cotton trade entrepreneurs, large real-estate owners, medical doctors and pharmacists, department store and restaurant and hotel owners, bankers, and financial agents. They were also renowned for their large estates, like the heirs of Comte Khalil de Saab and the Sussah family, Nagib Sursock, and the 'izba of George Daoud. They owned several international hotels. For instance, Khalil Bahari owned the Semiramis Hotel, which included the best restaurant in Mansoura. Dhaher al-Rayyes was the owner of the largest hotel in Mansoura, the Paris Hotel, while his brother, Bichara, owned the Claridge Hotel, and a third brother owned the Imperial Hotel.

The Shawam of Mansoura occupied key positions as medical doctors, showing why nearly half of the doctors in Mansoura used to be foreigners at that time, mainly Europeans. Levantines also notably became bank managers. Some Shawam earned the titles of Count, like Count Saab and Count Chedid. Others earned the titles of Pasha and Bek, while a few even earned the title of Emir (Prince), like the Lutfallah, and subsequently the Sursock, family.

== Identity ==
The term "Syro-Lebanese" or "Syrian-Lebanese" is an umbrella term to identify the people of the Levant, especially the generations who lived when most of the region was known as Bilad al-Sham, or the region of Syria. Between the late 18th century and early 20th century, thousands of Levantines left their homeland, mainly due to warfare, and Egypt became the first stop for many who aimed to reach the Western world.

In Egypt, as well as other nations with Syrian and Lebanese diaspora communities, the Levantines mainly identified by religion and city of origin, rather than by ethnicity. For example, one could identify as a "Greek Catholic from Zahle", while another could identify as "Greek Orthodox from Aleppo". For the most part, religious denomination and city of origin were more important to the Levantines than an actual "Levantine" or "Syro-Lebanese" identity. This may explain why it was generally easy for the Syro-Lebanese to assimilate into their newly found homelands and mix with other Christian populations, especially in Egypt. However, the Egyptians, and especially the Coptic Orthodox Christians, could easily point out a Levantine's non-native background due to their foreign Christian background, if not by their overall lighter skin tone.

After generations of living in Egypt, most of this community's descendants, now with Egyptian nationality, tended to identify more as "Egyptian", rather than "Levantine", "Syrian", or "Lebanese", while still maintaining their original Christian sect of identity. However, intermarriage for the Levantines in Egypt eventually became more common after generations, either with native Coptic Christians whom are in millions or with other foreign minority Christians such as Greeks, Armenians, and Maltese. There was much less intermarriage between Levantine Christians and native Muslims, as marriage between Christians and Muslims is still considered taboo in Egypt.

== Churches ==
Christianity is the dominant religion among Egyptians of Syro-Lebanese descent. The majority follow Greek Orthodox (originally Greek Orthodox Antiochian, but then falling under Greek Orthodox Alexandrian jurisdiction in Egypt), a founder sect of Christianity since the Greco-Roman Egypt, Melkite Greek Catholic Church and the Maronite Church. With Catholic education being popular among Christian families in Egypt, many Levantines also naturally attended Roman Catholic churches regardless of religious background.

• Greek Orthodox & Catholic Churches in Egypt:

- Cairo - Greek Orthodox Church of St. George, Greek Catholic Cathedral of the Resurrection, Greek Catholic Annunciation Church, Greek Catholic Immaculate Conception Church, Greek Catholic St. George Church, Greek Catholic St. Mary of Peace Church, Greek Catholic St. Joseph Church, Greek Catholic St. Cyril Church
- Alexandria - Greek Catholic Dormition Cathedral, Saint Sabbas Greek Orthodox Church, Greek Catholic Immaculate Conception, Greek Catholic St. Joseph,
- Damanhur - Saints Constantine and Helena Greek Orthodox Church
- Damietta - Saint Nicholas Greek Orthodox Church, and an old Greek Catholic Church that was converted to a Coptic Orthodox Church.
- El-Mahalla El-Kubra - Saint George Greek Orthodox Church, Saint Augustine Catholic Church
- Mansoura - Saint Nicholas Greek Orthodox Church, Saints Athanasius and Cyril Greek Orthodox Church, Dormition Greek Catholic Church
- Port Said - Saint Elias Greek Catholic Church
- Shibin Al Kawm - Saint Spyridon Greek Orthodox Church
- Tanta - Saint George Greek Orthodox Church, Dormition of the Holy Virgin Greek Orthodox Church, Presentation of the Lord Greek Orthodox Church, Saint Anne Greek Catholic Church
- Zagazig - Three Hierarchs Greek Orthodox Church, Dormition of the Holy Virgin Greek Orthodox Church, Saint Joseph Catholic Church

== Diaspora ==
The number of Syro-Lebanese in Egypt has decreased due to the nationalization policies of the Nasser government after the 1952 revolution. As a result, there has been extensive migrations to other countries such as Canada, the United States, France, Australia, Switzerland, and Belgium. The remaining Syro-Lebanese in Egypt began integrating into the rest of Egyptian society, including extensive intermarriage with Coptic Christians and Muslims. Today, most Egyptians of Levantine roots tend to identify more as Egyptian rather than Syrian or Lebanese, even though some traditionally belong to Christian denominations like Greek Orthodox other than Egypt's native Coptic Orthodox, Coptic Catholic, or native Protestant churches.

A large number of Syro-Lebanese families from Egypt now reside in Montreal; The communities of Saint Sauveur Cathedral (Melkite Greek Catholic), St. George Antiochian Orthodox Church, and St. Maron Church (Maronite Catholic), have many parishioners who are from Egypt or are descendants of Egyptian immigrants. Records from 1987 show that up to 250 families out of the total 1,300 registered families of St. George's Antiochian Orthodox Church of Montreal were originally from Egypt. In that same year, the Melkite Saint Sauveur Cathedral of Montreal reported to have approximately two-thirds of its 3,000 registered families originating from Egypt. Records from the St. Maron Church in Montreal show that out of its total 1,284 registered families in 1987, 600 of them were Maronites from Egypt.

Examples of family names of Greek Catholic Melkite Christians who faced oppression under the Nasser regime and were forced out of Egypt to then reside in Europe, Americas and Australia include: Absi, Ackaoui, Allouche, Anhoury, Arcache, Assouad, Ayrout, Ayoub, Azzam, Barakat, Behna, Bichara, Bittar, Boulad, Bahri, Cassis, Chahine, Chalhoub, Chedoudi, Dabbour, Debbané, Doummar, Dahan, Eid, Fakhoury, Gargoura, Gorra, Haddad, Hawawini, Hindeleh, Hobeika, Homsy, Jaouich, Kassab, Kahil, Kahla, Kheir, Kfouri, Klat, Karam, Labbad, Lahham, Mabardi, Médawar, Michaka, Mirza, Mitri, Naggar, Naoum, Nahas, Nemeh, Nimr, Rabbath, Rathie, Sarkis, Sednaoui, Sabet, Sabbagh, Samman, Sayeh, Sakakini, Sabounghi, Solé, Toutounji, Talka, Tawil, Tagher, Tawa, Tinawi, Yansouni, Zabal, Zalka, Zayat, Zananiri, Zogheb.

== Notable people ==
- Albert Cossery
- Omar Sharif
- Youssef Chahine
- Henry Barakat
- Anwar Wagdi
- Farid al-Atrash
- Asmahan
- Saleem Takla
- Mary Kahil
- Habib Ayrout
- Henry Habib Ayrout
- Charles Ayrout
- Farah Antun
- Georges Schehadé
- Sélim Khawam
- Roger Khawam
- Naguib Kanawati
- Lilly Kahil
- Badia Masabni
- Khalil Mutran
- Hind Nawfal
- Bob Azzam
- Anne de Zogheb
- Mary Queeny
- C. K. Alexander
- Zaynab Fawwaz
- Assia Dagher
- Andrée Chedid
- Anne-Marie Alonzo
- Geneviève Gemayel
- Celine Axelos
- Henri Boulad
- Marcel Boulad
- Fouad Haddad
- Fayza Ahmed
- Pauls Toutonghi
- Elisa Sednaoui
- Edward Said
- Manuel Tadros
- Xavier Dolan
- Jonathan Roumie
- Charles Issawi
- Ignatius Firzli
- Raphaël de Monachis
- Maximos V Hakim
- John Halaka
- Gregory II Youssef
- Paul Antaki
- Joseph Jules Zerey
- Georges Bakar
- Georges Hanna Sabbagh
- Georges Samné
- Joseph Elian Sarkis
- Robert Solé
- Gaston Zananiri
- Marianne Khoury
- George Noory
- Ronald Mourad Cohen

== See also ==
- List of Lebanese people in Egypt
- Lebanese people in Egypt
- The Nahda Movement (also referred as the "Arab Renaissance")
- Modern Arabic Literature
- Arab cinema
- Habib Tawa, French historian, specialist of this issue
