= Khawam =

Khawam is a surname. Notable people with the name include:

- Georges Khawam (born 1959), Syrian Melkite Catholic hierarch
- Gigi Khawam Kelley, Lebanese-American philanthropist, activist, and diplomatic advisor
- Joseph Khawam, BA (born 1968), Syrian-born Melkite Catholic hierarch, Apostolic Exarch of Venezuela
- René R. Khawam (1917–2004), Syrian translator known for translating the Qur'an, One Thousand and One Nights, etc.
- Roger Khawam (born 1993), Egyptian artist, record producer, beatmaker, songwriter and rapper
- Rony Khawam (born 1964), Lebanese judoka
- Sélim Khawam, dealer in Egyptian antiquities, founder of the firm that became Khawam Brothers
