= Arab socialism =

Political ideology

Arab socialism (Arabic: الإشتِراكيّة العربية, romanized: Al-Ishtirākīya Al-'Arabīya) is a political ideology based on the combination of pan-Arabism or Arab nationalism and socialism. The term Arab socialism was coined by Michel Aflaq, the principal founder of Ba'athism and the Arab Socialist Ba'ath Party in Syria, to distinguish his version of socialist ideology from the international socialist movement. While distinct from the much broader tradition of socialist thought in the Arab world, which predates Arab socialism by as much as fifty years, direct influence and evolutions of his thought, Marxist or otherwise, were realized and expanded upon in countries like Syria, Egypt, Iraq and others. A main innovation of Aflaq's thought was the transformation of Arab unity from an intellectual ideal into a real-world political pursuit of rights alongside a new set of socioeconomic conditions. Gamal Abdel Nasser's Egypt in particular served as a potent vehicle for Aflaq's thought, and would have to grapple with crises in the intellectual and military spheres.

== Ideology and historical practice ==
=== Early development ===
Niqula Haddad, the brother-in-law of Farah Antun, was a Syrian writer born in 1870 to an Orthodox Christian family, and arguably wrote the first book on socialism in Arabic, titled al-Ishtirakiyah, in the early twentieth century. Haddad supported a welfare state where the government would supply employment, medicine, school, and pensions. Haddad, along with Antun and Catholic-born Shibli Shumayyil, is credited with influencing the works of Salama Moussa, a well-known Egyptian writer from a Coptic family who wrote about Egyptian nationalism and later founded a short-lived socialist party in Egypt.

=== Original meaning in Aflaq's writings ===
The spawning of Arab socialism is thought to be a product of two developments in Aflaq's life: of the intellectual labor spent studying European philosophy in Paris, and his practice in the Arab political sphere. It can be considered monist given that the concept of Arab unity was both the origin and main goal of his project. For Aflaq, to be Arab is to be Islamic, Arabic-speaking and of a shared history. His line of thinking is best understood not as a linear evolution over time, but as a set of ideas all interlinked by what he called the "Arab Mission". The three main branches of the Arab Mission include "unity", "liberty" and "socialism", all backed by Islam as a spiritual driver and nationalism as a binding force. These branches, while all having significant overlap with each other, can be independently defined: "unity" meant an Arab majority in parliament, "liberty" meant parliamentarism and "socialism" meant national development. Liberty's allowances were twofold: it would prevent the splintering of the state and allow for proper combat against the enemies of the project (Imperialism, Zionism and Western colonization). After all, the goal of the Arab liberation struggle was to fight imperialism, oppose the ruling classes and fight for social justice. Tying "unity" to "liberty" was nationalism, which he defined as, "love before anything else". More concretely, he believed the nation ought to have the same kind of ties between citizens as do family members to each other, with nationalism primarily serving as a means to unite in the face of imperial threats. Parliamentary liberty combined with "socialism" served as a pathway to achieving unity. Socialism was to mean equality of opportunity and access to education, with education forming the foundation of practice.

Socialism, while subservient to the Arab unity project and liberty, remained just as important. Aflaq would contend that fighting for Arab liberation and unity was the same as fighting for socialism, believing they were two sides of the same coin. However, only with "intellectual consistency" and a "rejection of corruption" could socialism properly fuse with nationalism. Aflaq further noted that "the social economic question is the issue of prime importance in our life, but it is directly related to the wider issue of nationalism" and "we want socialism to serve our nationalism."

In 1950, Aflaq defined socialism as, "not an aim in itself, but rather a necessary means to guarantee society the highest standard of production with the farthest limit of cooperation and solidarity among the citizens […] Arab society […] needs a social order with deeper foundations, wider horizons, and more forceful realization than moderate British socialism." In 1955 Aflaq defined socialism as "the sharing of the resources of the country by its citizens."

=== Syrian Ba'ath constitution and practice ===
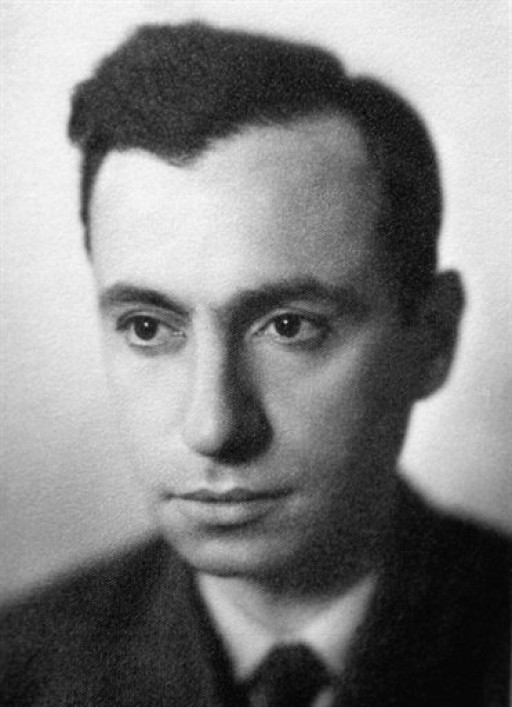
Michel Aflaq, founder of Ba'athism and Arab socialist ideology

The Ba'ath Party was founded in 1947 as the Arab Ba'ath Party, becoming the Arab Socialist Ba'ath Party in 1952 upon merging with the Arab Socialist Party. The party constitution of 1947 called for a "just redistribution of wealth", state ownership of public utilities, natural resources, large industry, and transport, state control over foreign and domestic trade, limiting the agricultural holdings of owners to the amount the owner could cultivate, an economy under some sort of state supervision, workers' participation in management and profit sharing, respected inheritance and the rights of private property. Prominent in Ba'athist writings from the 1940s and the 1950s, was the concern of exploitation of one group of citizens by another. The party forbade exploitation in its constitution in line with its direct confrontation with colonialism. It further called for the abolition of class and class differences in the future envisaged society.

Aflaq's concept of Arab unity would become a reality with the merger of the Syrian and Egyptian regimes from 1958 to 1961, built off the fusion of Nasser's revolutionaries with Aflaq's pan-Arabism. This embracing of authoritarian Nasserism exemplifies a shift within the Ba'athist movement away from liberalism and towards authoritarianism. The causes of this shift, as argued by scholar Rey Matthieu, are intertwined and threefold. First, internal struggles within the Ba'athist party coinciding with the Arab defeat in the Six-Day-War and subsequent Naksa revitalized the issue of defense in the minds of Arab nationalists. Furthermore, the super-powered tension between the Cold War blocs served to unify the fragmented Arab political landscape under a policy of neutrality. And in the Arab world, the political head of the concept of neutrality was Nasser. (In 1947 the Ba'athists had not yet chosen a side: the US funded Israel and Turkey, while the Soviets were atheist).

=== Between Aflaq's Ba'athism and Marxism ===
==== Initial disconnect ====
The socialism envisaged in the party's constitution of 1947 and in later writings up to the establishment of the United Arab Republic, is moderate and shows little, if any, signs of Marxism. The party's 1947 constitution reads, "socialism is a necessity which emanates from the depths of Arab nationalism […]. Socialism constitutes the ideal social order [for] the Arab people."

Indeed, socialism was a major component of Ba'athist thought, and it featured in the party's tripartite slogan of "unity, liberty, socialism". However, in using the term Arab socialism, Aflaq was not referring to the internationalist strain of socialism; his conception resolved socialism with Arab nationalism. Aflaq believed that classical international socialism of nineteenth century Europe was not suited to the Arab world, on the basis that Western socialism was "forced to stand up not only against capitalism but also against nationalism, which protected capitalism, against religion, which defended it, and against every concept which called for conservatism and the sanctification of the past." In a written statement from 1946, Aflaq wrote "The Arab nationalists are socialists", hence "there is neither incompatibility nor contradiction nor war between nationalists and socialists."

While Aflaq always found it easier to define socialism as what it was not, one thing he and Salah al-Din al-Bitar were certain of, was that Arab socialism was not communist or related in any way to communism. Part of the reason for this was the French Communist Party's support for lengthening the French Mandate of Syria. In a published shortly after that decision was made, Aflaq wrote "If I am asked to define socialism, I shall not look for it in the works of [Karl] Marx and [Vladimir] Lenin." The main cardinal difference between Arab socialism and communism, according to Aflaq and Ba'athists in general, was the cardinal role given to nationalism. Since everything in Ba'athist thought was somehow linked to Arab nationalism, Aflaq could not bridge the gap between nationalism and communist internationalism. However, he did note Josip Broz Tito's policy of self-determination while governing Yugoslavia. Another difference was that Aflaq did not support the communist idea that class struggle was the central piece throughout human history, given that role instead to nationalism. Arab socialism rejected communism based on the belief that it was deceitful, as it sought to tie "the Arab destiny to the destiny of another state, namely Russia".

==== Later turn towards Marxism ====
However, in the 1950s, changing attitudes of socialism within the Ba'ath Party began to be apparent. Jamal al-Atassi, in a writing dating to 1956, wrote that while Arab socialism was not communism, the party could learn from the experience of the socialist countries of how to construct a socialist society. It was around this time communist-inspired terms such as "masses of the people" and "people's organization" began to be heavily used in Ba'athist literature, while at the same time emphasizing class conflict more than before. He wrote that "Socialism cannot realize its goals unless it starts from the [fact of] division, difference, and conflict among society's structures and classes." Atassi ended the article by calling for the "oppressed classes" of the workers, peasants and "other strugglers" to join in the effort to overthrow the oppressors to establish a united Arab society. In short, he called for revolutionary struggle. While Aflaq did believe class conflict existed, he believed it to be subordinate to nationalism.

Munif al-Razzaz, a Jordanian Ba'athist, wrote the Ba'athist classic "Why Socialism Now?" in 1957. In it he takes a "very different" approach on interpreting the meaning of socialism from Aflaq. As he wrote, "Socialism is a way of life, not just an economic order. It extends to all aspects of life—economics, politics, training, education, social life, health, morals, literature, science, history, and others, both great and small." In contrast to official party writings which stressed Arab unity above else, Razzaz tried to demonstrate the interdependent nature of unity, liberty and socialism. He criticized the view that socialism had to come after Arab unity, stating "Socialism, freedom and unity are not different names for different things, ... but different facets of one basic law from which they spring." He further noted that "If I believe in man and in man's worth, then I should believe in unity, nationalism, freedom, and socialism because each of them represents a facet of man's fundamental value." Razzaz ended the article, stating that socialism had been achieved to the same degree as "freedom and unity have been achieved."

== Nasserism ==
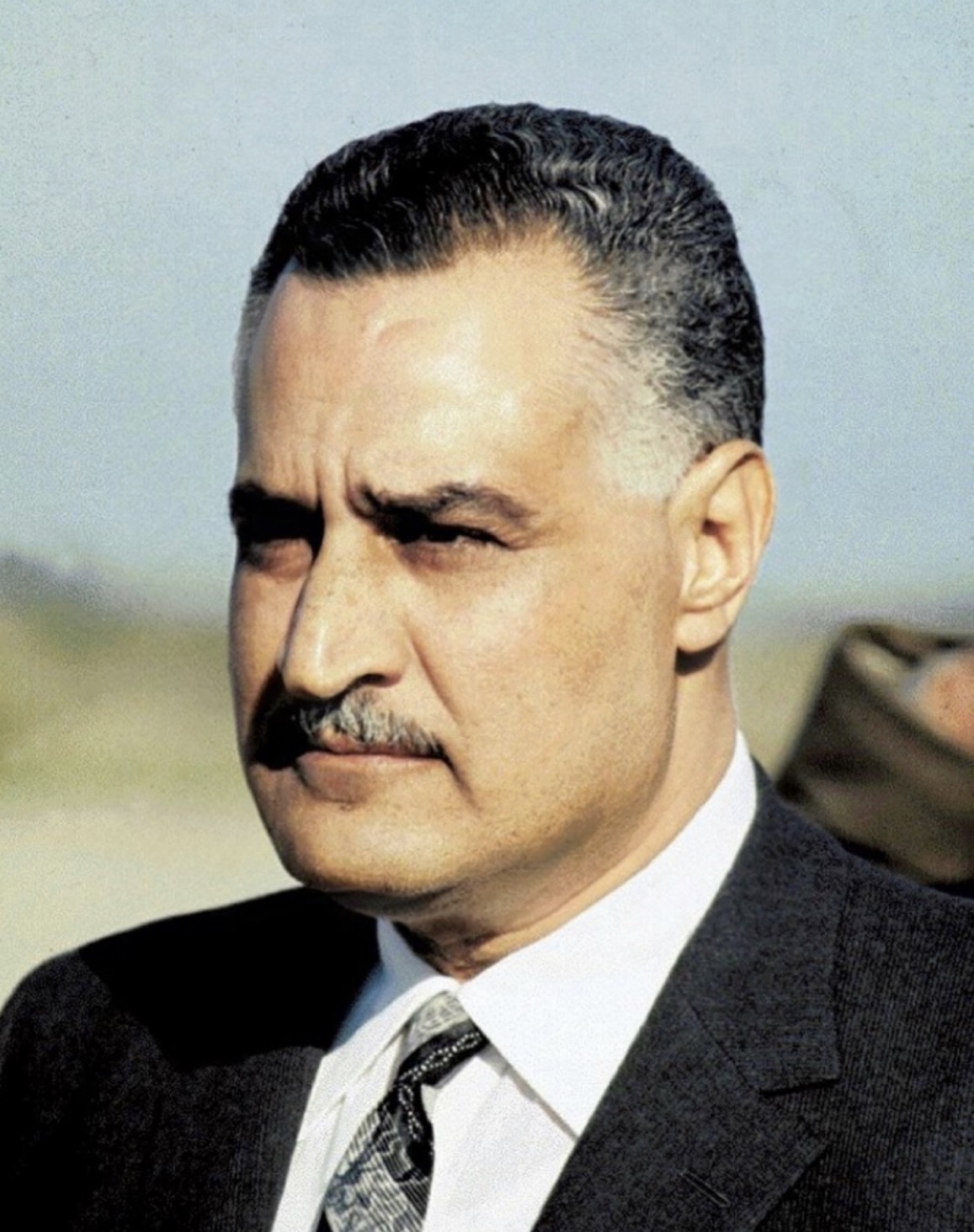
Gamal Abdel Nasser

Arab socialism in Egypt has its roots in pan-Arabism, nationalism, anti-colonialism and Islamic thought. It greatly differentiates itself from communism and other forms of Western socialism, both of which greatly focus on the material conditions, whereas Arab socialism also incorporates religious ideals. These ideas are to be found in the Qu'ran, which aimed at the distribution of wealth and the caring for all members of society. Socialism had also been introduced at the beginning of the nineteenth century through French thinkers which recognized the particularities of the Egyptian thought towards revolutionary movements.

Arab socialism was greatly developed through the influence of Gamal Abdel-Nasser, who came to create the definition of Arab socialism. Nasser's socialism was based on a pragmatic and empirical approach which broadly disregarded the theoretical framework of socialism if it had no basis in the real conditions that Egypt was facing. Moreover, he staunchly opposed the internationalism of other Egyptian communists, seeking alliance purely on pragmatic terms until later purging them. After the successful coup d'état of 1952, where King Farouk was deposed bloodlessly, Nasser was only guided by six main tenets: the end of imperialism, the end of the government of capital, social justice (end of domination), creation of a strong national army, creation of a fully operational democratic system and the end of the feudal system. Guided by these, he also stressed the importance of a double revolution, a revolution which had to be political and social. Political as it needed to end feudalism and the corrupt government; social because it needed to end with oppression between classes. The end of oppression did not mean class abolishment, but class harmony within the state. He wanted to create the conditions for everyone to have equal opportunities to perform whichever role within society, for which he invested in education and public health measures. Addressing students at Alexandria University in 1966, Nasser stated that there was no 'Arab socialism' but an 'Arab application of socialism'.

Nasser's socialism had the goals previously mentioned, and he tried to accomplish them through a neutralism in the foreign sphere and socialist measures at the national level. He did not want to participate in the global divide of the time between the USSR and USA at the global sphere as he wanted to prioritise Egypt's national interests through a policy of positive alignment. Throughout his mandate, he passed several reforms, which included the redistribution of land through the abolishment of feudalism, worker laws which ensured their participation into committees which had direct contact with management. He aspired to eventually convert into a form of direct democracy, which he saw necessary for a true socialist state and the well being of every individual.

Nasser, in his adoption of Arab socialism, focuses on embracing and encompassing religion within socialism, as he perceives it to be part of Egypt's social fabric, being one of its main constituents. He therefore rejects Marxist historical materialism and historical determinism, which allows for a hands-on approach to his conception of history. Although arguments can be made for inspirations or adoptions of Marxist thought in certain instances, like when Nasser came to adopt the communist stance of armed support for Sudanese self-determination. Scholar Rif'at al Sa'id argues the more widespread embrace of socialism in the 1960's would also serve as evidence to this claim.

=== 1961 Cairo Convention: debate and critique ===
Critical to the development of Arab socialism in the 1960's was a series of political debates held in Cairo, Egypt. Scholarship on the events declare it "a moment of crisis and critique" within Arab political history. Ideologues from all across the political spectrum were invited, from socialists to nationalists and liberals to conservatives, all to debate the role of the intellectual vis-a-vis the state in building Arab socialism.

Muhammad Haykal, drawing from his Crisis of the Intellectuals, attempted to convince a "reluctant leftist vanguard" to join arms with the Nasserist project, arguing that without cooperation between Nasser's military clique and the intellectual sphere, Arab socialism would fall. On the other hand arguing against Nasserian ideals is Clovis Maksoud and his piece, The Crisis of the Arab Left, which would come to serve as the Arab socialist political platform. He seeks to critique both contending models of political economy: Nasser's Arab socialism and the Soviet state-centric project (despite borrowing their rhetoric). Maksoud blasts what he calls the "bourgeoise national liberation" of Nasser's movement as providing a sense of political liberty without collective equality. Conversely, Soviet "economistic socialism" provides the feeling of collective equality but lacks proper avenues for exercising political dissent. To sublate the two and prevent the deterioration of Arab nationalism into totalitarianism, a "substantive socialism" must replace "idealism, identity and isolationism". Maksoud recognized the Arab left (which he defined as those "striving towards the inclusion of the masses in politics and the minimisation of class differences" with "material conditions determined thought") as a potentially palpable force, but it must reckon with the necessity of grassroots operations given the complete military capture of the Egyptian and Iraqi states.

The implications of the debate shook the Arab intellectual sphere. Most pressing perhaps, is how Nasser would come to formally adopt Arab socialism in the Egyptian National Charter of 1962. The conference also allowed for clarity on the various positions that existed vis-a-vis Arab socialism. Its composition was quite diverse, pulling in political advocates from all across the political sphere into heated debate: from nationalists to liberals and from conservatives to socialists. Furthermore, it cemented Nasser's Cairo as the base for not just Arab neutrality, but the global non-Alignment movement.

=== Jewry within Nasserism ===
From 1910 to the 1950s, Egyptian Jews would hold various positions across the political stratum, from active leadership roles to your average "rank-and-file" member, exerting intellectual influence on policy making, founding large movements themselves or otherwise contributing to ground-level activism. It would not be until after the 1948 war that most communist Jews were exiled from Egypt. Post-exile, scholarship and debate dedicated to examining the role of Jewry in Egyptian socialism would focus on the question of whether or not "ex-comrades of Jewish origin" could be blamed for its failure. But division on a number of points would proliferate. As the Arab-Israeli conflict would unfold, these debates became much more antagonistic and tended to view the Jewish role with more pessimism. A significant portion of Jewish communists were atheists, in stark contrast to the Islamism of Arab socialism, further increasing the weight of the Palestine question. Rami Ginat argues that according to the scholarship at large, Jews played a crucial role in Egyptian socialist nation building, with opinions ranging on Jewish motivations, their stances with regard to Israel, and their level of culpability with regard to the schisms within the movement.

=== Internal criticism ===
Egyptian leftists at large blame repressive state structures in tandem with the growth of right-wing Islamism for the failure of their socialist project. Arwa Salih, an Egyptian left-revolutionary feminist, would ground her criticism of the Egyptian regime in gender, breaking taboos regarding sex and morality within the male-dominated Egyptian communist movement. Salih draws attention to the ways conservative takes on "emotions, gender relations, moral regimes and sexuality" impeded the growth of the Egyptian left movement.

Chehata Haroun was an influential Jewish Egyptian revolutionary whose particular persuasion of socialism butted ideological heads with Nasserism. A Marxist of the international variety, he opposed the exclusive nationalism inherent to Nasser's Arab socialism. His central argument was threefold: (1) his Jewishness does not negate his Egyptian identity, (2) Both Zionism and the Arab leadership have shared fault in the "asphyxiation of Egyptian Jewry", and (3) Jews are integral to Egyptian culture and society as a whole. In contrast to many Jewish Egyptian communists, Haroun would maintain his Jewish identity while in Egypt, building support for nationalist critique of Nasser.

== Consequences of the 1967 Arab-Israeli War ==
The Arab defeat in the Six-Day War held a vast array of consequences for Arab socialism and the Arab left as a whole, marking a series of political and intellectual transitions. Firstly, it spelled the end of decolonization and pan-Arabism as a military project, instead capturing the attention of wandering revolutionaries and directing it towards the Palestinian struggle. It cemented the turn towards Marxism in Arab left circles and marked the beginning of Nasser's decline, altering the entire trajectory of the MENA region's history. Critique of the "Old Left" associated with Nasser's regime led to the development of a "New Left" current. Conversely, the Naksa also shifted the Overton window to include more radical and Islamist focused ideologies.

Understanding of the New Left's trajectory is made possible by examining the founding of the Egyptian Communist Organisation (1969) and its development into the Egyptian Communist Workers' Party (1975) as a part of a new radical left current characterized by clear discontinuities with the Old Left or its Marxist outgrowths. Related popular Egyptian movements in the wake of Nasser's 1967 resignation called for him to remain and face consequences, creating a space for public political critique of his regime. Student protests in the following years represented the first significant instance of public government critique in decades, even as the government monopoly on "all political life" and the stunted scope of the protestors slashed chances of success. Eventually, Nasser's death in 1970 alongside further protests would open up avenues for more varied independent politics, even if the New Arab Left would ultimately fall short of realizing any tangible vehicle for change. Anwar al-Sadat, while still a target of popular protest, would consolidate power in the 1971 Corrective Revolution.

== External reception ==
The website of the Arab Socialist Ba'ath Party has an entry dated 1 January 2011, stating: "In 28/10/2003, by the attendance of comrade Al-Ahmar and Mr. Ching, the Arab Socialist Ba'ath Party and the Chinese Communist Party agreed to sign an agreement at the end of the discussions for three years, 2004/2005/2006. The two parties wish to promote and enhance the relations of friendship and cooperation between their two parties and co-ordinate their efforts for embodying their common objectives for the wellbeing of their two friendly peoples".

On the other hand, the Arabist Bernard Lewis has stated: "Nobody seems to have a good word to say for Arab socialism. Commercial, professional, and middle class elements bring against it the usual complaints which are brought against socialism in Western countries. Left-wingers dismiss Arab socialism with contempt as a half-hearted and inefficient compromise which has the merits neither of socialism nor of capitalism."

A Soviet analyst on the subject of the Ba'athist movement noted "The concept of socialist structure [as it] appeared in the articles and speeches […] [in] the period of the birth of the new movement [the Ba'ath] […] was just a hazy outline on a barely developed ideological negative."

== See also ==
- African socialism
- Socialism with Chinese characteristics
- Arab nationalism
- Arab fascism
- Ba'athism
- Islamic socialism
- Nasserism
- Pan-Arabism
- Third International Theory
- Marhaenism
- Titoism

== Bibliography ==
- Devlin, John (1975). The Baath Party: a History from its Origins to 1966 (2nd ed.). Hoover Institute Press. ISBN 978-0-8179-6561-7.
