= List of Lebanese people in Egypt =

This is a list of notable individuals born in Egypt of Lebanese ancestry or people of Lebanese and Egyptian dual nationality who live or lived in Egypt.

== Film, television and radio personalities ==
- Youseff Chahine, film director
- Henry Barakat, film director
- Assia Dagher, actress and producer
- Nour el Houda, actress
- Mary Queeny, actress and producer
- Georges Schehadé, playwright and poet
- Hana Shiha, actress
- Badia Masabni- actress and dancer
- Rose Al Yusuf- actress and journalist

== Writers and journalists ==
- George Antonius- author and historian
- Farah Antun- journalist and secularist
- Alexandra Avierino, journalist and writer
- Celine Axelos, poet
- Andrée Chedid, poet
- Zaynab Fawwaz- novelist and playwright
- Labiba Hashim- novelist and founder of Fatat al-sharq
- Khalil Mutran- poet and journalist
- Hind Nawfal, journalist and feminist writer
- Ihsan Abdel Quddous- novelist
- Edward Zaid, writer
- Jurji Zaydan- novelist, founder of Al-Hilal
- May Ziadeh, writer

== Media ==
- Beshara Takla, co-founder of Al-Ahram
- Saleem Takla, co-founder of Al-Ahram

== Music and Arts ==
- Farid al-Atrash, singer, composer and musician
- Bob Azzam, singer
- Édika, comics artist
- Manuel Tadros- singer and actor

== Architects ==
- Naoum Shebib, architect, designer of the Cairo Tower

== Activists ==
- Aya Hijazi, American social activist.

== Athletes ==
- Jamal Taha, association football player and coach
- Alain Attalah, basketball player and coach

== See also ==
- List of Lebanese people
- List of Lebanese diaspora
- Lebanese people in Egypt
