= Boulad =

Boulad may refer to:

- Henri Boulad (born 1931), Egyptian Melkite, Jesuit priest and author
- Marcel Boulad (1905–1977), Egyptian fencer
