= Al-Shawarbi family =

Egyptian aristocratic and political family

Al-Shawarbi family عائلة الشواربي
- Aristocratic, Political
- Country: Egypt
- Current region: Qalyubia, Cairo
- Origin: Banu Jurhum tribe (Hejaz)
- Founded: 7th century

The Al-Shawarbi family (Arabic: عائلة الشواربي) is an Egyptian political and aristocratic family that has been prominent in Egyptian public life since the 19th century. The family has produced numerous members who served in parliamentary bodies from the era of Muhammad Ali through the 1952 revolution, particularly representing the Qalyubia region, and has left a significant architectural legacy in downtown Cairo.

== History ==
The family traces its lineage to the Banu Jurhum tribe of the Hejaz, in what is now western Saudi Arabia. According to historical accounts, their ancestors migrated to Egypt during the Islamic conquest under Amr ibn al-As in the 7th century. The family identifies as descending from "Al-Shawarbi the Great" of the Quraysh tribe. Initial settlements were established in the Shubra district of Cairo, followed by relocation to the commercial area of Qanater (Al Manja), and final establishment in Qalyub, now in northern Cairo.

A significant event in family tradition involves an encounter with the 13th-century sultan Baybars, who stayed with them incognito during his travels. After his departure, a family member discovered and returned a money pouch Baybars had left behind. Impressed by this honesty, Baybars granted the family honors and land holdings in the Qalyubia, Monufia, and Sharqia provinces.

During the French campaign in Egypt (1798-1801), Suleiman al-Shawarbi organized peasant militias against the French forces. He was captured and executed by hanging on the same day as Suleiman al-Halabi, assassin of French General Jean-Baptiste Kléber.

The family supported the 1919 Revolution against British occupation. Historical documents indicate continued nationalist activities during the 1956 Suez Crisis, when the wife of Abdul Hamid al-Shawarbi was tasked by President Gamal Abdel Nasser with smuggling funds to resistance fighters in Port Said, successfully evading French inspection.

== Legacy ==
The family's influence is memorialized through Al-Shawarby Street, a major thoroughfare in downtown Cairo which is also home to the Shawarby Pasha Building, a historic landmark. The building was the home of Muhammad Pasha al-Shawarbi, a landowner and politician who served as a member of the House of Representatives in 1882, later becoming a member of the Consultative Council and eventually its Deputy Speaker. He was also known for his philanthropic works, including establishing the Qalyub Hospital and building a grand mosque at Qalyub Station, and the creation of a charitable endowment.

== Notable members ==
- Sheikh Salim Bey al-Shawarbi – Shura Council member (1870-1873)
- Al-Hajj Nasr Mansour al-Shawarbi – Member of the Shura Council of Deputies (1866), representing Qalyub.
- Hamed Pasha al-Shawarbi (1889-?) – Born March 3, 1889, in Qalyub. He began his career as secretary in the Judicial Control Committee in 1911, then served as secretary to Ali Abu el-Fotoh, Undersecretary of the Ministry of Education, before becoming secretary to the Minister of Justice, Shukri Pasha. Later, he became Deputy Prosecutor of the Zagazig Court, then a judge in the Civil Courts, and was elected as a member of the Egyptian Parliament for Qalyub District. In 1925, he received the title of Pasha. Mohamed Pasha El-Shawarbi, the family patriarch, appointed him administrator of his extensive endowments, overseeing distribution of stipends to family members.
- Hayam Hanem El Shawarby – Wife of MP Mohamed Shaheen and mother-in-law of Aida Abdel Nasser.
- Omar Bey al-Shawarbi – Parliamentarian (1938-1939, 1942-1944)
- Salah al-Din Bey al-Shawarbi – Parliamentarian (1936)
- Khitab Bey al-Shawarbi – Parliamentary representative
- Abdul Hamid Pasha al-Shawarbi – Parliamentarian (1945-1949)
