= The Egyptian Peasant =

1938 book by Henry Habib Ayrout

- Title page for The Egyptian Peasant (1963)
- Author: Henry Habib Ayrout
- Original title: Moeurs et coutumes des fellahs
- Language: French
- Genre: Non-fiction
- Publication date: 1938
- Publication place: France

The Egyptian Peasant is a book by Henry Habib Ayrout about the life of the Egyptian peasant (fellah). It is regarded as a major work on the subject. Halim Barakat has described it as "unsympathetic and biased".

== History of the publication ==
The book was first published in France, in 1938, under the title Moeurs et coutumes des fellahs. After that, the book went through some revisions, and translations by the author, for the English audience. It was also translated to Arabic. The book was published in English-speaking countries in 1963.
