= Habib Ayrout =

Egyptian architect (1876–1956)

- Born: 1876; Cairo, Egypt
- Died: 1956 (aged 79–80); Cairo, Egypt
- Citizenship: Egyptian
- Occupation: Architect
- Spouse: Joséphine Fine Dahhan
- Children: Charles Ayrout; Henry Habib Ayrout; Maxime Ayrout

Habib Ayrout (1876 – 1956) was an Egyptian architect, best known as one of the builders of Cairo’s Heliopolis suburb.

== Early life and education ==
Habib Ayrout was born into a family of Syrian Catholics of the Greek rite. His family arrived from Aleppo in the early 19th century as part of the influx of skilled Christian immigrants sought by Ottoman Viceroy Muhammad Ali. Ali was trying to modernize Egypt and recruited people who were able to bolster Egypt's administrative, commercial, and technical sectors.

By the time Ayrout was born, Egypt had a large middle class, and Syrian expatriates—a tightly-knit community known as the Shawam, were thriving in professions like engineering and construction. The Ayrout family spoke French and Arabic but they lived among the expatriate Greek, Armenian, Maltese, French and Italian communities. In 1882, the British moved into Egypt, meaning that Ayrout grew up in a time of rapid urban transformation and European influence, and in a multi-cultural environment characterized by tolerance and economic growth. All of this would shape his career in architecture.

== Career ==
In 1897, Ayrout went to Paris for his post-secondary education, graduating from École nationale des ponts et chaussées with a degree in civil engineering. He returned to Cairo in 1901. He became a design and engineering contractor, advising on urban planning and design projects that required a blend of efficient engineering and culturally-sensitive design. In 1905, he became the only Egyptian architect on new Cairo suburb Heliopolis; while French and Belgian architects built the project's grand palaces, Ayrout constructed the practical housing that supported the suburb's early expansion–the middle-class homes and workers' homes. Ayrout embedded into European design local Egyptian elements such as arched facades, balcony screens and reception rooms. Ayrout also designed the only Catholic church in Heliopolis, Saint Cyril.

Ayrout applied the same culturally-sensitive approach to other projects, in the Cairo suburbs of Garden City, Zamalek, Roda Island and Maadi. In the city's core, his most notable building is the Shawarby Pasha Building. Because two of his sons were architects, and joined his firm c. 1925, there remains considerable confusion about who designed which buildings.

== Personal life ==
In January 1904, Ayrout married Joséphine Fine Dahhan. They had three sons and four daughters. Two sons, Charles Ayrout and Maxime Ayrout, were architects in their father's firm. His son Henry Habib Ayrout was a sociologist and Jesuit priest who, in 1940, established the Catholic Association for Schools of Egypt.
