= Al-Jamia (magazine) =

Arabian magazine

al-Ǧāmiʿa
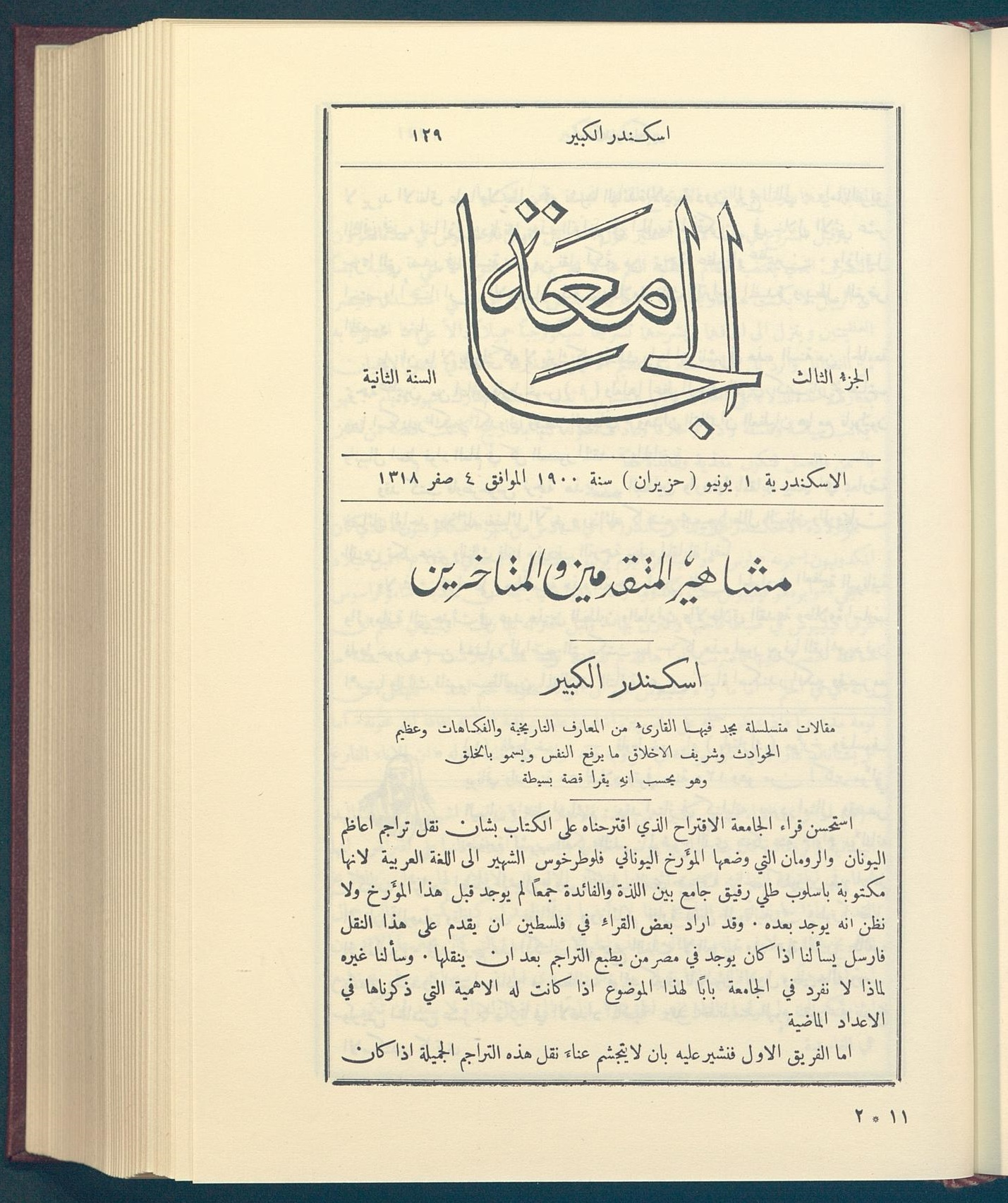
- Categories: Culture, education, politics, history
- Frequency: Biweekly in the beginning, later monthly
- Publisher: Faraḥ Anṭūn
- First issue: 15 March 1899; 127 years ago
- Final issue: January 1910; 116 years ago
- Country: Egypt
- Based in: Cairo
- Language: Arabic
- Website: nbn-resolving.de/urn:nbn:de:hbz:5:1-68533

The Arabic periodical al-Ǧāmiʿa (meaning “community" in English) was founded in 1899 and initially published in Alexandria by Faraḥ Anṭūn (1874–1922), an Egyptian intellectual. The desk then moved to New York in 1906 and to Cairo in 1909. Between 1899 and 1910, 77 issues were published in seven years; the first 12 issues bore the title "al-Ǧāmiʿa al-ʿuṯmānīya". Several issues were published as double-editions or comprised consecutive supplements. While making the digitalized periodical accessible in the digital collections of the Bonn University Library, this peculiarity was taken into account and indicated for reference. The published articles dealt with political, cultural, and historical topics while emphasizing education as well as the role of women and the family.
