= John Halaka =

Visual artist

- Born: John Halaka; 1957; Mansoura, Dakahlia, Egypt
- Education: University of Houston
- Movement: Palestinian art

John Halaka (born 1957) is an Egyptian-born American visual artist, documentary filmmaker, and Professor of Visual Arts at the University of San Diego in California. He is considered an expert in painting, drawing, photography, documentary filmmaking, oral history, and modern and contemporary Palestinian art.

== Education and publications ==
Halaka was born in Mansoura, Egypt, in 1957. Born to a Greek Orthodox Christian family of Levantine background, his father was of Palestinian descent and his mother was of Lebanese descent. They moved to the United States in 1970.

He received his Master's of Fine Arts degree in 1983 from the University of Houston in Texas.

He has taught at the University of San Diego since 1991.

His writing has appeared in edited anthologies, art catalogues, and academic journals, most often Jadaliyya. He has also been interviewed for and profiled in journalistic and academic reports on contemporary Arab art.

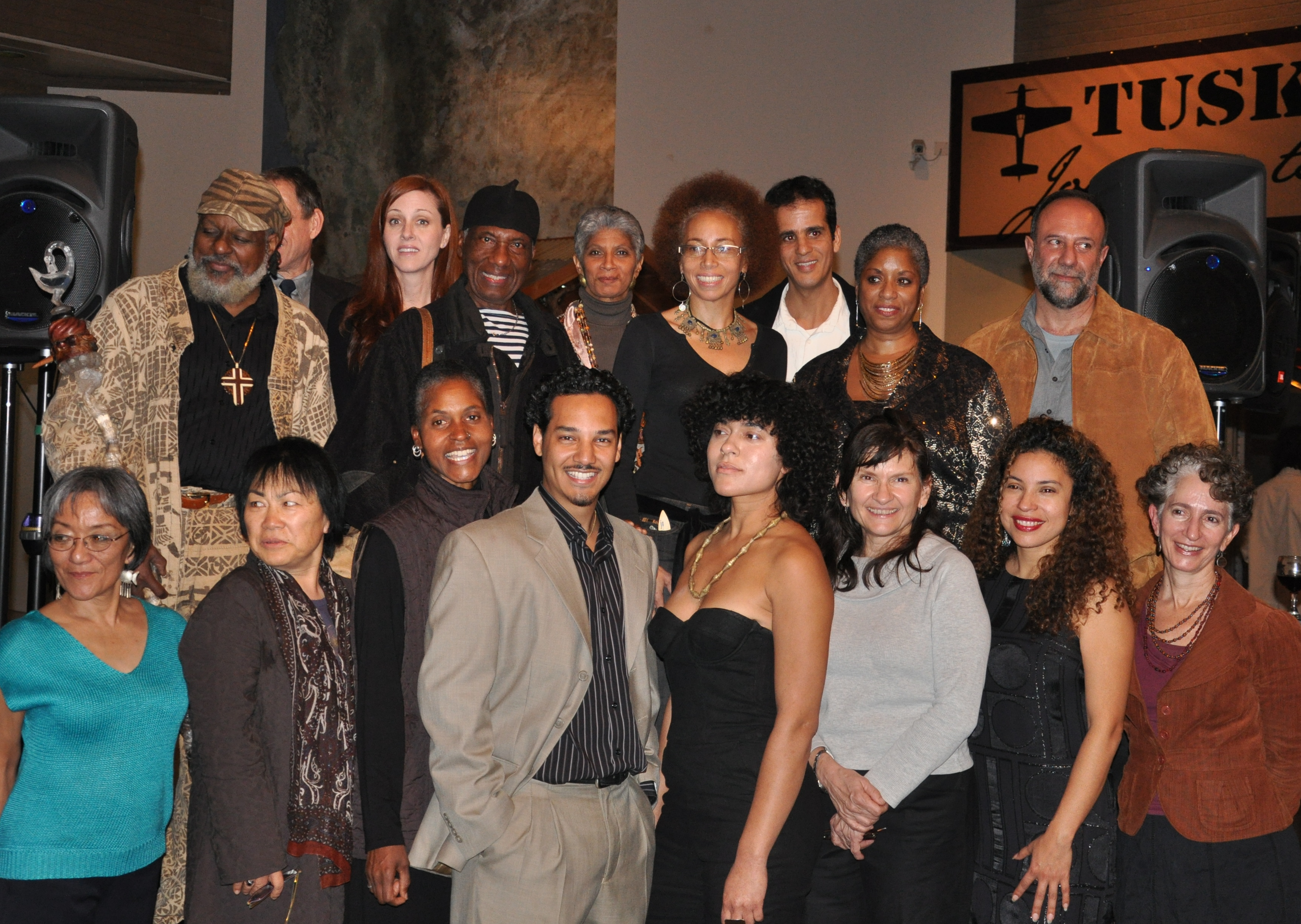
John Halaka (top right) among artists at the California African American Museum in 2009.

== Artistic works ==
Halaka's artwork has been exhibited in Michigan; California; Alaska; Washington, D.C.; Palestine; Spain; and the United Kingdom. He was featured in the inaugural exhibit of the Arab American National Museum. He also participated in the ongoing "I Witness Silwan" mural project in Batan al Hawa and contributed to the major exhibition (and subsequent book) The Map Is Not the Territory: Parallel Paths—Palestinians, Native Americans, Irish (2013).

He is past recipient of a Fulbright award to Lebanon, where he conducted oral history interviews among Palestinian refugees of multiple generations. He was also awarded a U.S. Scholar fellowship from the Palestinian American Research Center for 2018–2019 for his project Vanishing Harvest: Meditations on the End of Palestinian Agriculture.

Halaka is one of the artists who has created works for the I Witness Silwan art installation in East Jerusalem.

== Select bibliography ==
- "Sketches from the Margins of Marginalized Communities: Lessons in survival, resilience and resistance acquired from Palestinian refugees," in Migration Across Boundaries: linking research to practice and experience, edited by Parvati Nair and Tendayi Bloom (2016).
