= Lebanese people in Egypt =

Total population
- 1940s (peak time): 40,000 to 131,000; 2000's: 5,000

Regions with significant populations
- Mostly Cairo and Alexandria. Formerly also Mansoura, Port Said, Tanta, Suez

Languages
- Arabic, French

Religion
- Majority: (Melkite Greek Catholic, Greek Orthodox, Maronite Catholic); Minority: Islam (Shia/Sunni), Judaism

Related ethnic groups
- Lebanese people, Lebanese diaspora, Lebanese American, Lebanese Argentine, Lebanese Brazilian, Lebanese Canadians, Lebanese Mexican, Lebanese Colombian

The Lebanese people of Egypt are people from Lebanon or those of Lebanese descent who live or have lived in the country of Egypt. Many prominent figures that have emerged in Egypt were of Lebanese origin, the highly acclaimed Egyptian filmmaker, Youssef Chahine. Most Lebanese who resided in Egypt were highly educated, and the community as a whole contributed to both Egypt's cultural and financial well-being, especially during the era of the Muhammad Ali dynasty. Since the Egyptian Revolution of 1952, most of Egypt's Lebanese community left the country immigrating to the Americas, Europe, and Australia, as well as many returning to their native Lebanon (especially Beirut).

The height of Lebanese immigration into Egypt occurred between the 19th and early 20th centuries. As Lebanon was part of Ottoman Syria during this time, Christians from all over the Levant (modern-day Syria, Lebanon, and Palestine) were immigrating to Egypt as one "Shawam" (شوام), or "Levantine" group. Hence, an umbrella term for their community is "Syro-Lebanese". The number of Lebanese Christians in Egypt grew drastically during the 1860 Lebanon conflict, in which thousands of Christians were killed along with hundreds of their villages destroyed. The vast majority of Lebanese and other Levantine migrants who arrived in Egypt were well-educated and French-speaking.

The historic Lebanese community of Egypt, especially during the 19th and early 20th centuries, was almost exclusively Christian (Melkite Greek Catholic, Greek Orthodox, and Maronite Catholic), with small numbers of Muslims and Jews among them.

== See also ==
- List of Lebanese people in Egypt
- Arab diaspora
- Lebanese diaspora
- Syro-Lebanese in Egypt
