= Joseph Elian Sarkis =

Syrian-Egyptian writer and translator

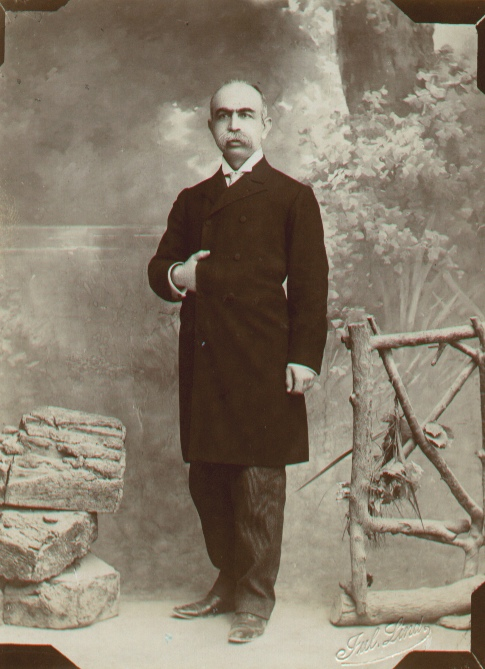
- Born: 1856; Damascus
- Died: 1932 (aged 75–76); Cairo, Kingdom of Egypt
- Occupations: Writer, editor, translator, bookseller
- Honours: Order of St. Gregory the Great

Joseph Elian Sarkis (1856–1932) was a Syrian-Egyptian writer and translator.

== Biography ==
Born in Damascus in 1856, Joseph was a writer, translator, and bibliographer, he was also known for his activity as a bookseller-publisher in Cairo, where he settled in 1912. He pursued his literary activity alongside a banking profession, as he worked for nearly 35 years as an employee at the Ottoman Imperial Bank in the branches of Beirut, Damascus, Cyprus, Ankara, and Constantinople.

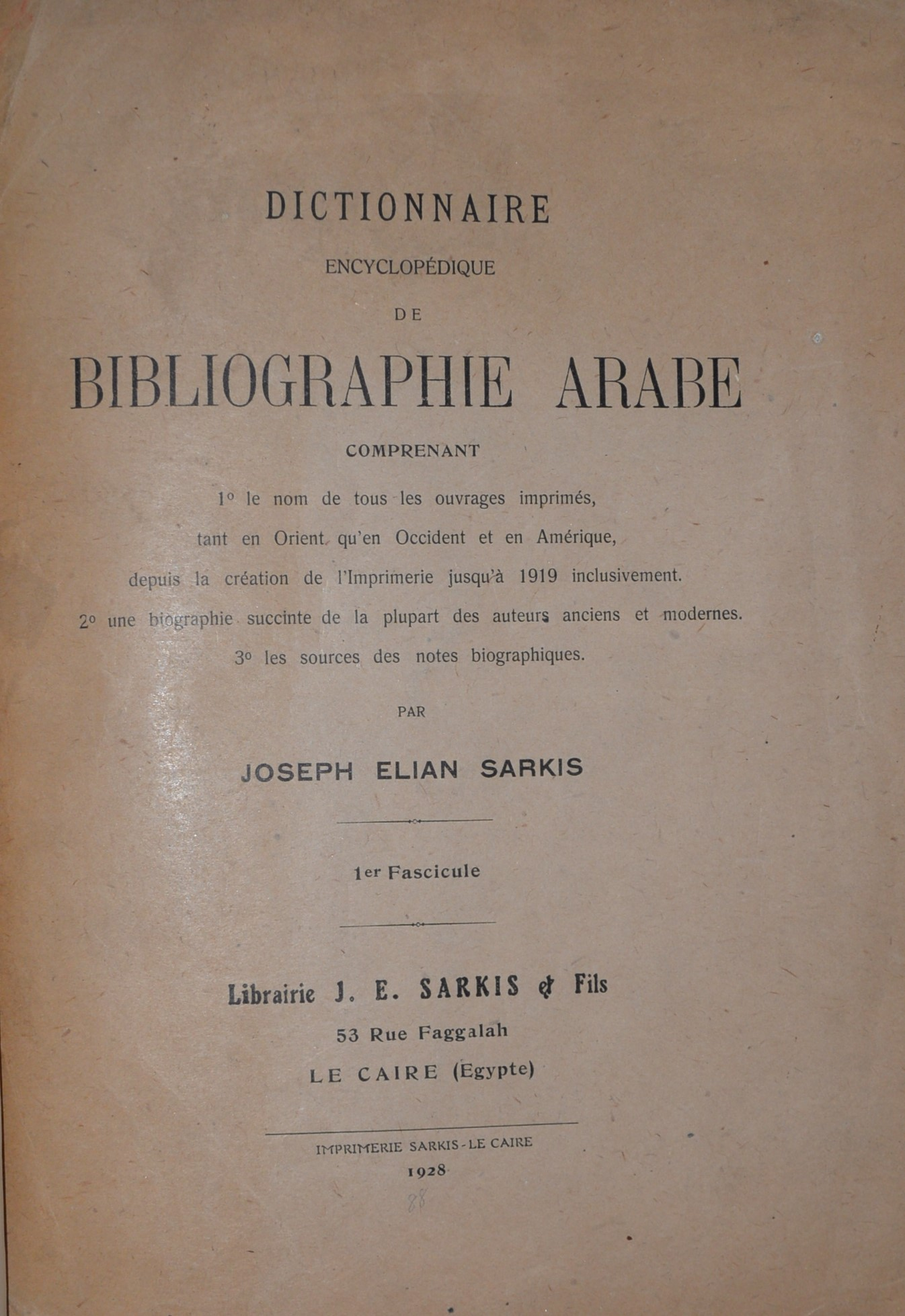
Encyclopedic Dictionary of Arabic Bibliography, Published by J.E. Sarkis

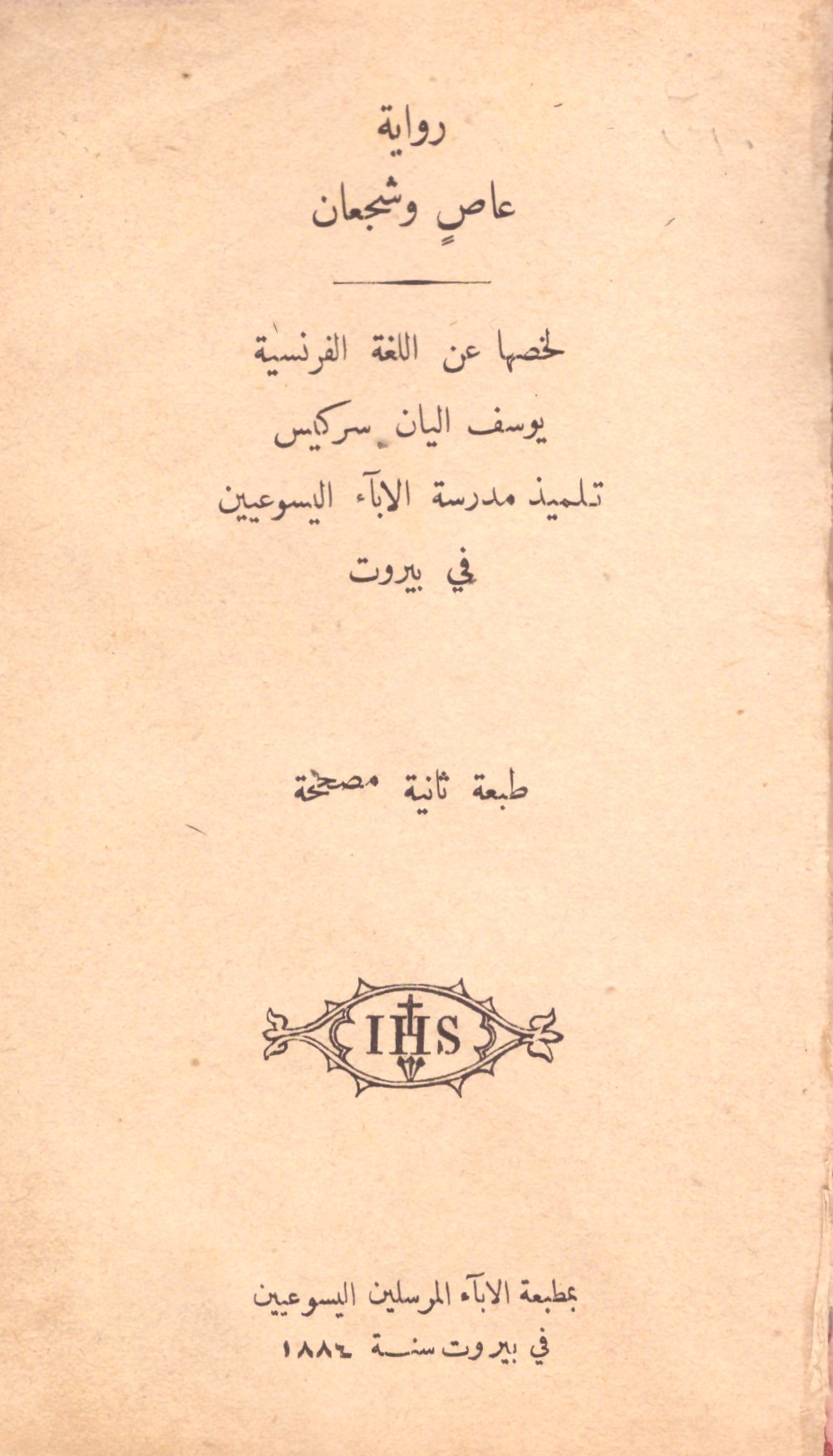
Les naufragés de Spitzberg, by Louis Friedel, translated into Arabic by J.E. Sarkis

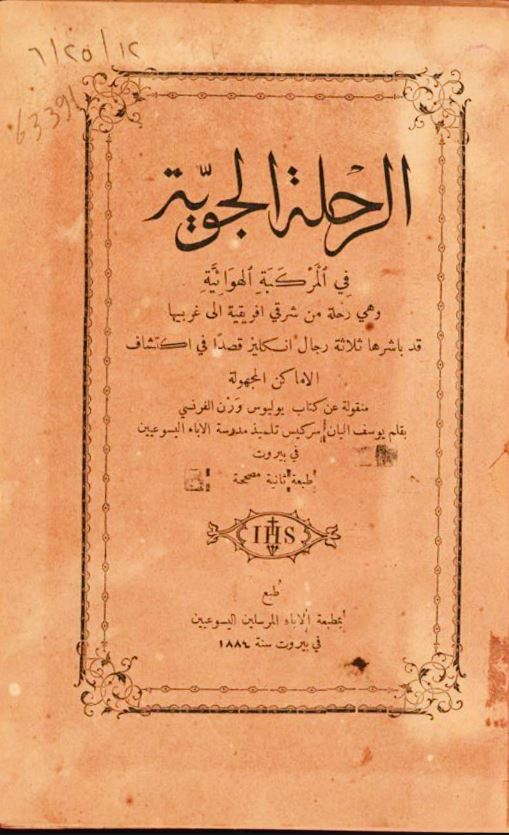
Five Weeks in a Balloon novel by Jules Verne translated into Arabic by J.E. Sarkis
