= St. George Antiochian Orthodox Church (Montreal) =

Church in Montreal, Canada

Coordinates: 45°32′23″N 73°36′51″W

St. George Antiochian Orthodox Church of Montreal
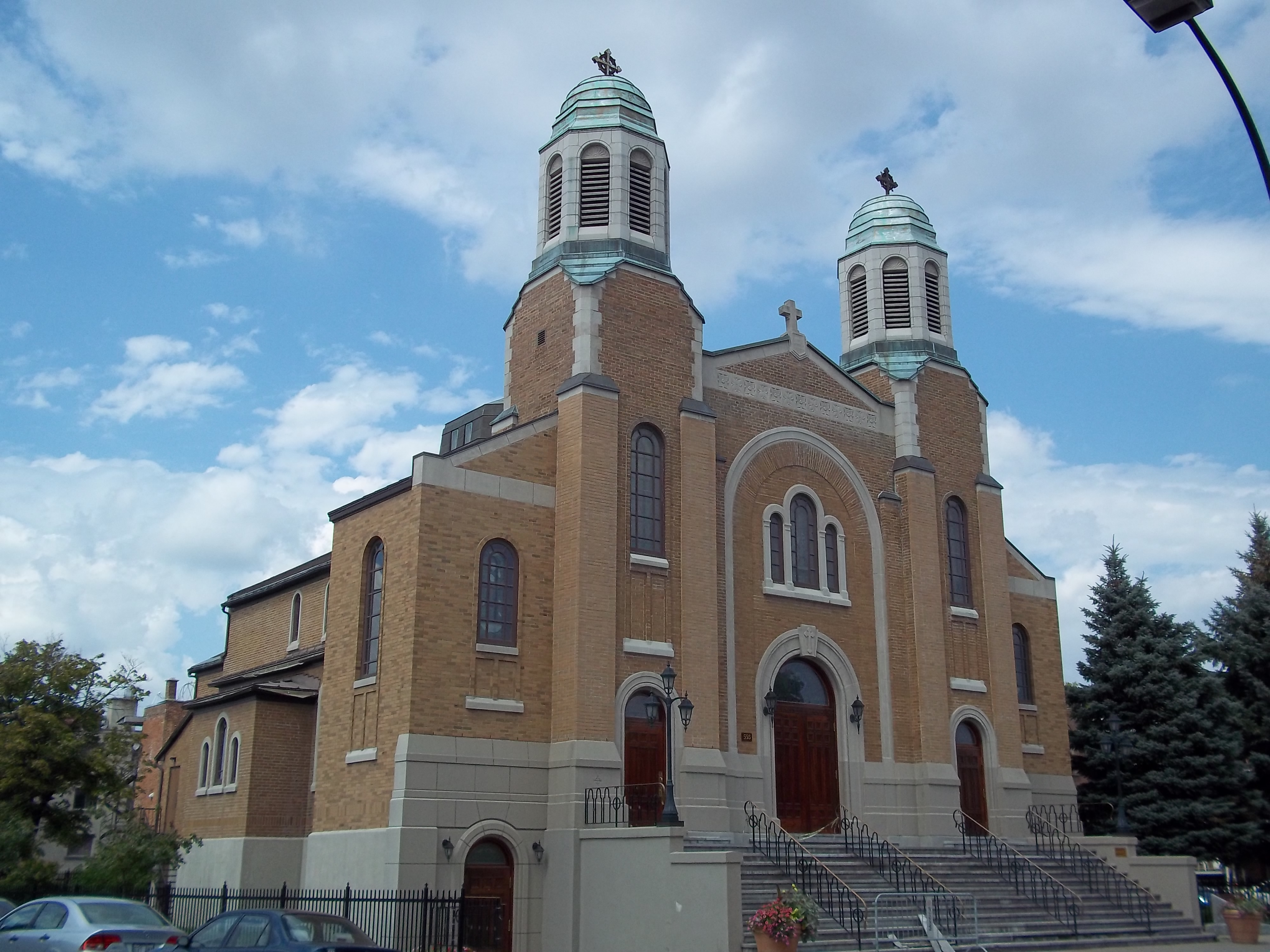
- St. George Antiochian Orthodox Church of Montreal
- Location: 555, rue Jean-Talon Est; Montreal, Quebec, Canada; H2R 1T8
- Country: Canada
- Denomination: Greek Orthodox Church of Antioch

Architecture
- Architect: Joseph-Raoul Gariépy
- Style: predominantly Byzantine
- Groundbreaking: 1939
- Completed: 1940

National Historic Site of Canada
- Official name: St. George Antiochian Orthodox Church National Historic Site of Canada
- Designated: 1999

St. George Antiochian Orthodox Church (French: Église Saint-George Antiochian Orthodox) is a brick Antiochian Orthodox church in the Villeray neighbourhood of Montreal, Quebec, Canada. Designed by architect Joseph-Raoul Gariépy, the church was constructed in 1939–40 to serve the Syrian Orthodox community in Montreal. It was designated a National Historic Site of Canada in 1999 as an important symbol of the history and traditions of this community in Canada.

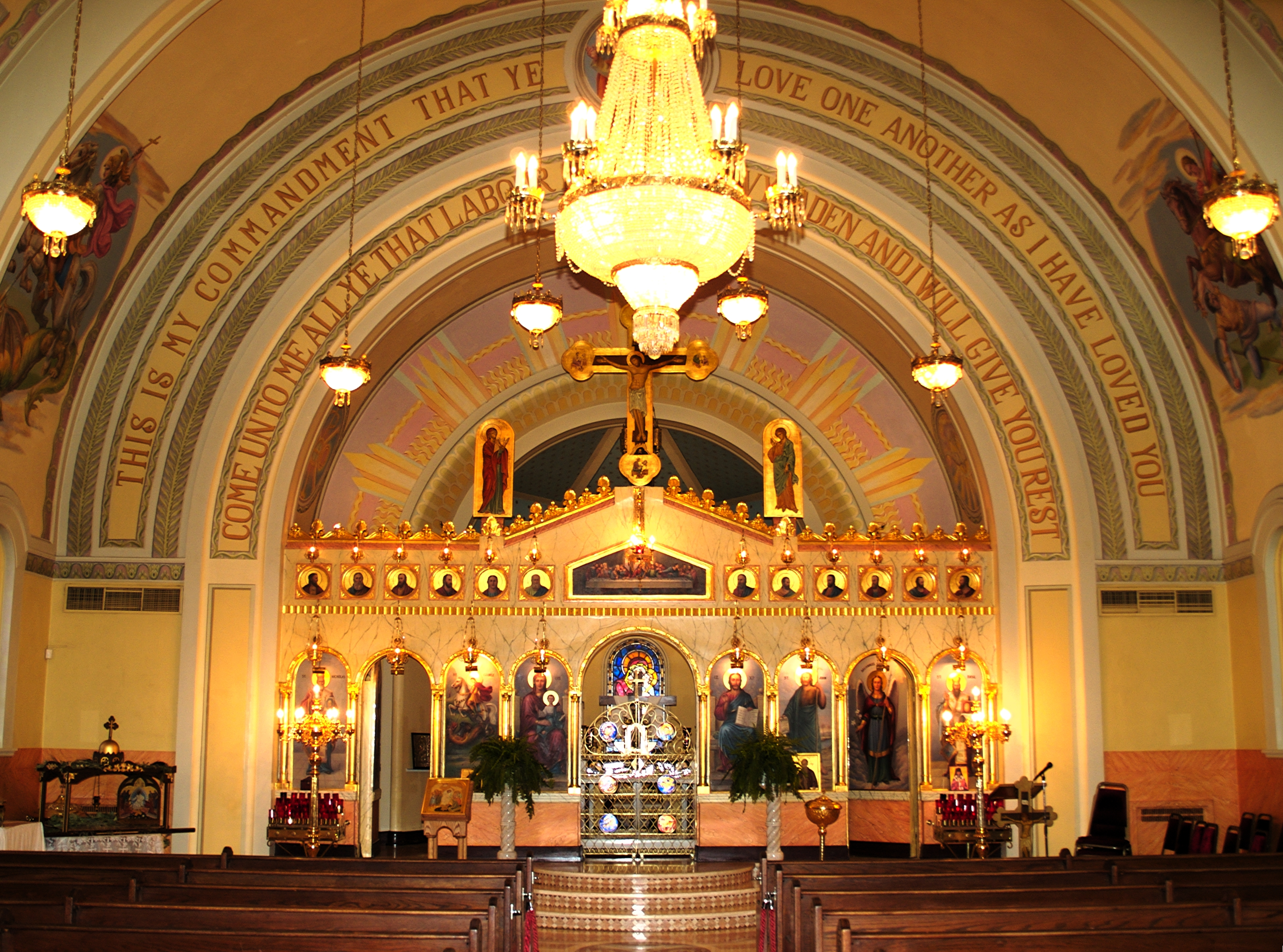
View of interior of St. George Antiochian Orthodox Church

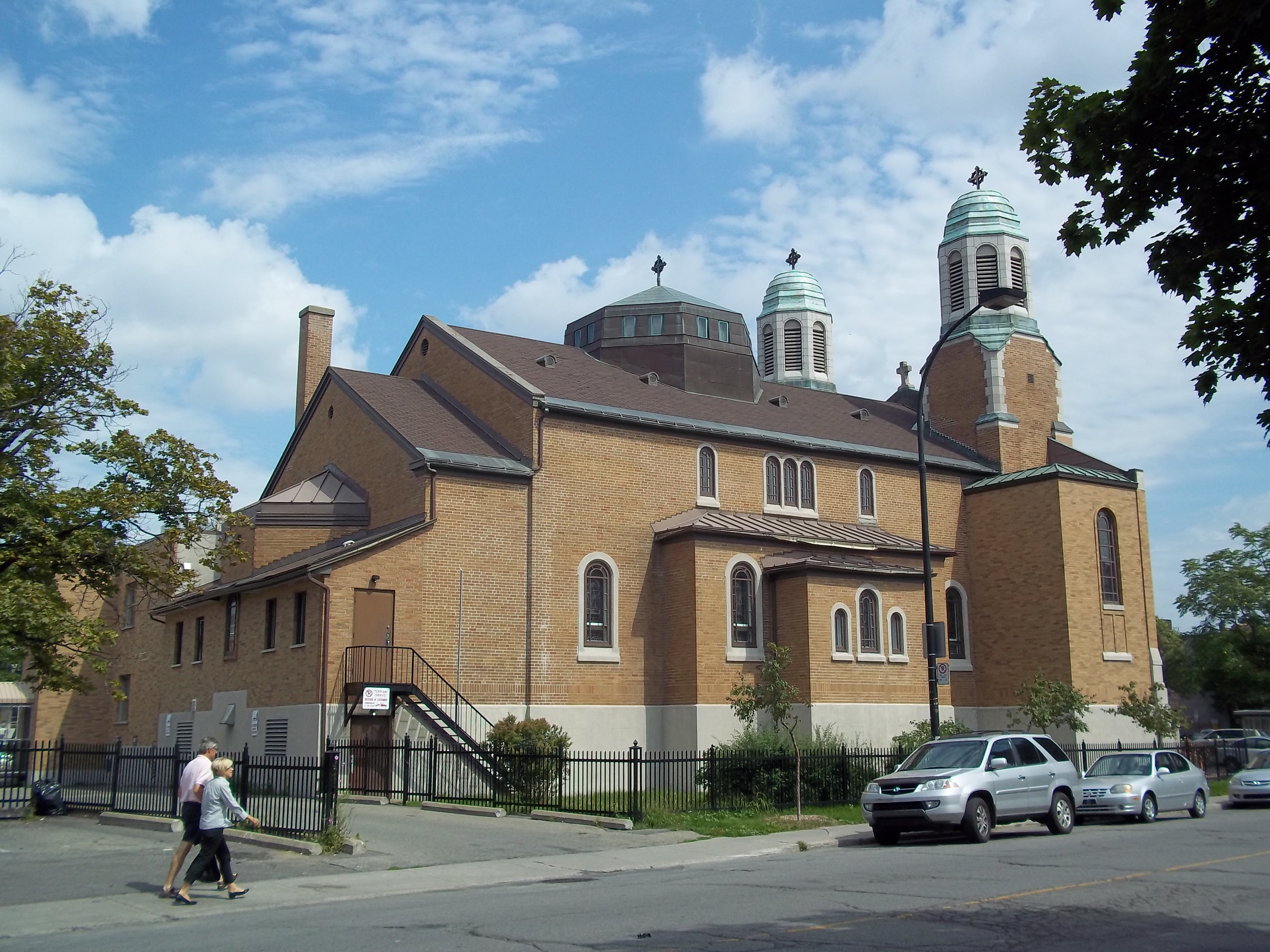
Side view
