= Ali Abu el-Fotoh =

Egyptian jurist, lawyer, law clerk, writer, economist (1873 – 1913)

Mr. Ali Abu el-Fotoh Bek Pasha
- Born: 1873; Belqas, Khedivate of Egypt
- Died: 1913 (aged 39–40); Cairo, Khedivate of Egypt
- Citizenship: / Khedivate of Egypt
- Education: Saint Louis School, Egypt; University of Montpellier, France; University of Paris, France
- Occupations: Lawyer, economist, law clerk, writer

Ali Bek bin Ahmad bin Abu el-Fotoh Pasha (Arabic: علي بك بن أحمد بن أبو الفتوح باشا), commonly known as Ali Abu el-Fotoh (علي أبو الفتوح) (1873 – 1913) was an Egyptian jurist and economist. He was born in Belqas and grew up there. He studied in Tanta, then traveled to France, where he studied at University of Montpellier and the University of Paris and obtained a doctorate. In Egypt, he moved through judicial positions until he was appointed Head of the Appeals Prosecution and then the Undersecretary of the Ministry of Education. He died in Cairo at the age of 40. He has several judicial and literary books.

== Biography ==
He was born in the city of Belqas in Dakahlia in 1290 AH/1873 AD to a wealthy, old family and grew up there. His father was one of the most prominent Gharbia notables, while his mother was the daughter of a senior official during the reign of Mahammad Ali Pasha. He received a traditional education in his childhood. He completed memorizing the Qur’an at the village's Kuttab when he was eleven years old. He received the principles of his science at Belqas's office, then at the Saint Louis School in Tanta and stayed there for six years, during which he completed his primary and secondary studies. At that time, he was an example of a diligent, well-mannered student who was keen on his lessons, and after he obtained the baccalaureate degree with distinction then he traveled to France and studied law at the University of Montpellier and obtained a bachelor's degree from there. He was fluent in French, both speaking and writing, in a way that impressed his French teachers. Someone said about him: "He is good at it like one of its sons." In France, he founded the first Egyptian student association in Europe and was elected its general president. He and other members also published “Egyptian Progress Magazine,” the association's mouthpiece. He attended the legal conferences held in Paris during its general exhibition in 1900 and wrote a book called: "An Egyptian Tourism in Europe." Then he obtained a doctorate in economic sciences from the University of Paris. He also participated in several European legislative assemblies, contributed to drafting various laws, and participated in major legal conferences such as the Paris Conference. Then he returned to his homeland in 1894 and was appointed acting assistant in Tanta, then he was promoted to be appointed president of the appeals in 1908, then director of Girga in 1909, then undersecretary of the Ministry of Education.

Khayr al-Din al-Zirikli described him as “a genius in the sciences of law.” He worked in writing, reading, and compiling a library in Arabic and French. He had articles and research published in French and Arabic magazines. He died in Cairo in the year 1331 AH/1913 and was mourned by Ahmad Shawqi, Hafez Bek, Ismail Sabri Pasha, and other writers and poets. Among them is Shawqi's poem.

== Works ==
Abu el-Fotoh was passionate about translation and writing, and his basic works did not distract him from this matter. He, in collaboration with his companions, translated important books on French, including the book “Political Economy” by William Stanley Jevons. He also wrote some important books and legal research in Arabic and French.

- An Egyptian Tourism in Europe (سياحة مصري في أوروبا), 1900
- Political Economy (الإقتصاد السياسي), William Stanley Jevons, co-translated, 1908
- The Social Doctrine in Criminal Legislation (المذهب الاجتماعي في التشريع الجنائي), a sermon delivered at a major party of the Higher Schools Club on March 25, 1906.
- A collection of thoughts on the judiciary, economics and society (مجموعة خواطر في القضاء والاقتصاد و الاجتماع), 1913
- Islamic Sharia and positive laws (الشريعة الإسلامية والقوانين الوضعية), 1913
