= Saleem Takla =

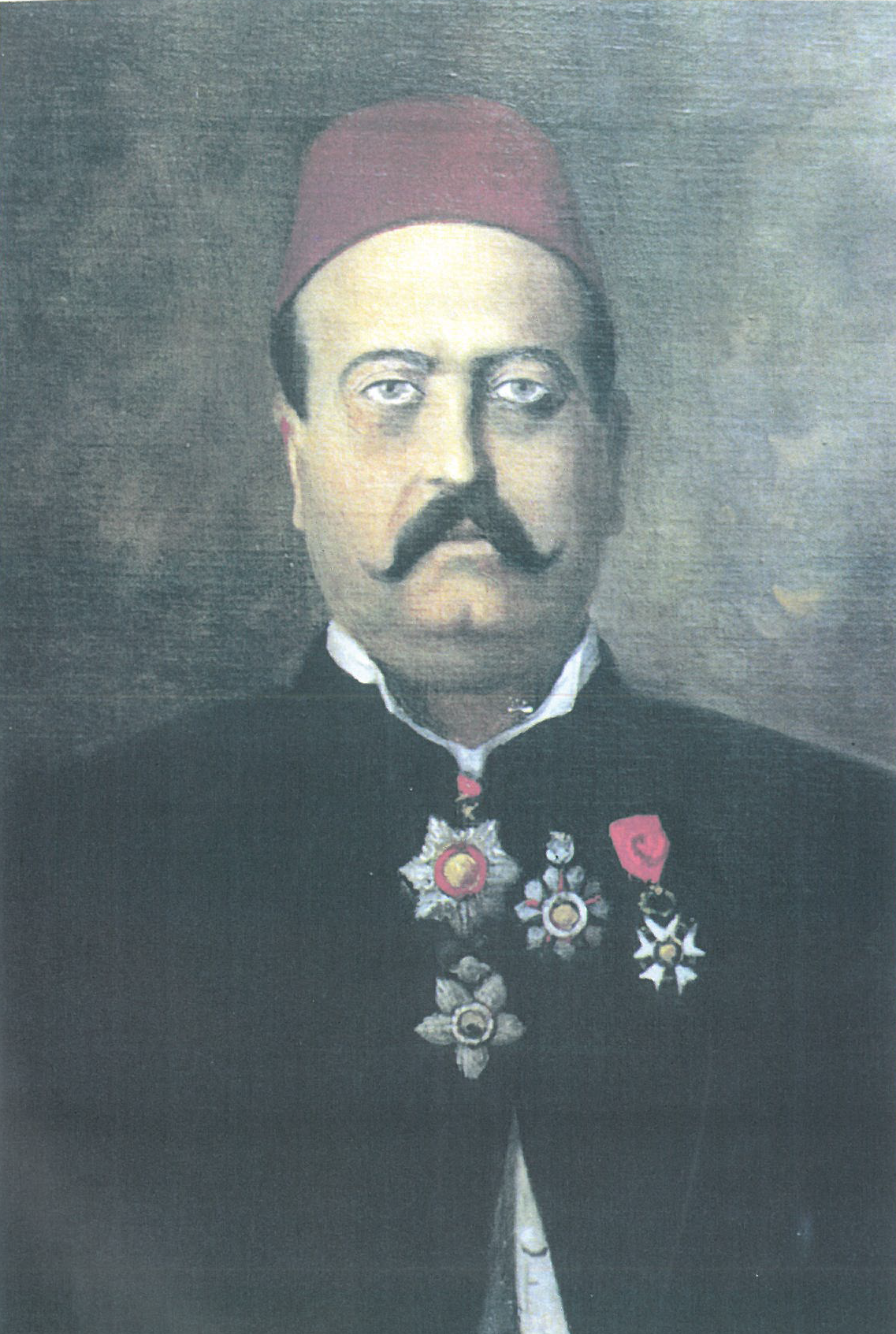
Saleem Takla

Saleem Takla (Arabic: سليم تقلا, also spelled Selim Taqla; 1849 – August 8, 1892) was a Lebanese-Ottoman journalist who founded of Al-Ahram newspaper with his brother Beshara Takla.

== Early life and education ==
Saleem Takla was born in Kfarshima, Lebanon in 1849 to Khalil and Nada Takla. The Takla family was Melkite Greek Catholic. When he was 12, he was sent to school in Beirut, first to a grade school organized by Cornelius Van Alen Van Dyck and then to the National School in Abey founded by Butrus al-Bustani. During that time, the 1860 Druze–Maronite conflict dramatically impacted the region. After completing his studies, Takla taught at the Patriarchal College in Beirut founded by Gregory II Youssef.

== Moving to Alexandria and Founding Al-Ahram ==
In 1874 Takla moved to Alexandria, Egypt. During this period, Alexandria was “both a bridgehead of European colonialism and a crucible of Egyptian national integration and identity.” More people were becoming literate, thanks in part to the development of new schools in the city, and conflicts and crises throughout the Middle East piqued public interest in world events. Furthermore, Alexandria was becoming a center of the news and publishing businesses, with many European news services, printing presses, and publishers setting up shop in the city. A large population of translators in the city, many of them Syro-Lebanese (like Takla), further aided the newspaper business by allowing Arabic newspapers to better report on international events using sources in other languages. Finally, Isma'il Pasha, the Khedive of Egypt from 1863 to 1879, and his successors patronized several Alexandria newspapers, which certainly aided the development of the industry.

As Syro-Lebanese immigrants, the Takla brothers benefited from belonging to a community recognized for “their knowledge of languages,” familiarity “with the practice of Arabic journalism,” and “close connections with Egypt's political and commercial élite.” In the newspaper business, “offering news of events in Syria and in the Syrian community” gave new papers access to a niche market, specifically the Syrian community in Alexandria.

Despite all of these advantages, the Takla brothers “moved cautiously.” They “spent seven months attempting to find subscribers, and even printed up a facsimile copy for promotional purposes, before actually going to press.” Finally, in 1876, the Takla brothers began publishing al-Ahram (meaning the Pyramids), “for a long time the most prestigious daily in the Arab world”. The next year, in 1877, they began publishing Sada al-Ahram (meaning Echo of the Pyramids), followed by al-Waqt (meaning the Time) in 1879 and al-Ahwal (the Conditions) in 1882.

== Political action and censorship ==
As described above, Alexandria in the 1860s and 1870s offered many benefits to newspapers, including the patronage of Isma'il Pasha. However, that support came with the expectation that newspapers would support the government. This policy was enforced not only through government patronage, but also by law. According to Juan Cole:

“In October 1863 the Egyptian foreign minister made it known that Ottoman censorship laws would henceforth be more strictly applied in Egypt, through a special government department overseeing newspapers. Newspapers were to abstain absolutely from any criticism of governmental actions and avoid any discussion of matters, the mention of which might affect relations with foreign powers. Reporters had to report news from the provinces in a manner that kept to the facts, avoiding any criticism of officials. Editors were responsible for orally reporting the content of articles to the Press Bureau before going to press. Newspapers contravening these articles of the law would receive three warnings, after which they would be closed down and large fines would be imposed.”

These declarations aside, the environment of Alexandria moderated the force of censorship laws. The large foreign presence in Alexandria, including Syro-Lebanese like the Takla brothers, helped limit enforcement of the laws, since many foreigners enjoyed some form of protected status in Egypt, a system that began with the Capitulations of the Ottoman Empire. The educational system further provoked resistance to censorship by developing and enlarging the intellectual class. Furthermore, by allowing newspapers more license, Isma'il Pasha hoped “to use the press to fight off the increasing influence of Britain and France over Egyptian internal affairs” and therefore “allowed a livelier Arabic political press to grow up that had some hope of surviving financially.”

Eventually, the Takla brothers did run afoul of censorship laws. They first “had their Sada al-Ahram suspended and fined for finding fault with Isma'il, and on its second serious offense the Publications Department simply ordered it out of existence.” However, the Takla brothers had other newspapers, and this setback did not prevent them from continuing to attempt to exert political influence using their other outlets.
