= Robert Solé =

French journalist and novelist of Egyptian origin

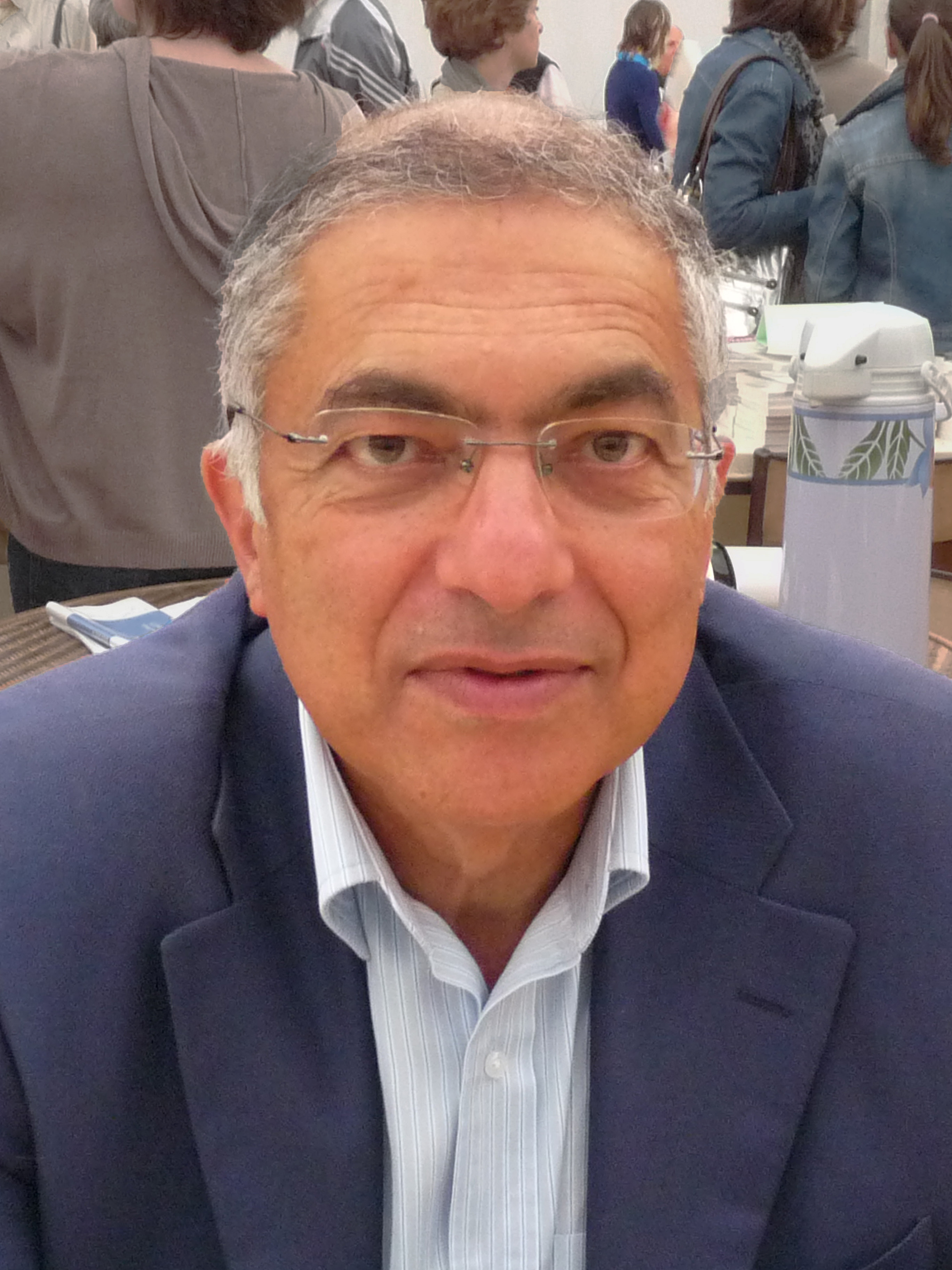
Robert Solé at a book fair in 2011

Robert Solé (born 1946) is a French journalist and novelist of Syrian origin. Born in Cairo in 1946, Solé moved to France at the age of 18. He has served as ombudsman of the Parisian newspaper Le Monde. His works of fiction include Le Tarbouche (winner of the Prix Mediterranée in 1992) and La Mamelouka. Solé studied at the École supérieure de journalisme de Lille in Lille.
