= Charles Ayrout =

- Born: Charles Habib Ayrout; 1905; Cairo, Egypt
- Died: 1961 (aged 55–56); Cairo, Egypt
- Occupation: Architect
- Parent: Habib Ayrout
- Relatives: Henry Habib Ayrout, Maxime Ayrout

Charles Habib Ayrout (1905–1961) was an Egyptian architect who is considered one of Cairo's '"pioneer" architects. He is noted for his Belle Epoque/Art Déco (1920–1940) landmark buildings and villas, and was one of the most active builders in the Heliopolis district from 1925 to 1950. He summarised his approach in 1932 as to “bring to Heliopolis the principles of modern architecture, but not of avantgarde architecture."

Ayrout was the eldest son of Habib Ayrout, the Egyptian architect who was on the original Heliopolis team that built the suburb beginning in 1906. Charles Ayrout had two brothers, the Jesuit priest Henry Habib Ayrout and Max Ayrout, who was also an architect practicing in Cairo. When Charles and his brother became qualified as architects, both joined their father's firm c 1925. Because the three architects worked together from 1925 to c 1955, there remains considerable confusion about who designed which buildings.

== Style ==
Ayrout was part of a movement of French educated Egyptian architects, who were strongly influenced by the French 'modern classicism' of Michel Roux-Spitz and Pol Abraham. However, he stressed the importance of learning the principles of Modern architecture, and reapplying them in Egypt, as opposed to copying them.

=== Selected Works in Cairo ===
- Bldg, 26 July/Hassan Sabri, Zamalek
- 25 Mansour Street, Bab al-Louk
- Ayrout Bldg, Cherif Pasha Street
- Abdel Hamid El Shawarbi Pasha Building, Ramsis Street/26 July Street
- Ayrout Villa, Zamalek
- Mosseri Building (now Mofti) on Shagaret Al Durr St., Zamalek
- Bishara Bldg, Nile Avenue
- Halim Doss Bldg, Midan Shafakhana
- Ibrahimieh Secondary School, Garden City
- Kahil Bldg, Kantaret al-Dikka
- Bldg Gamal el Dine Abou El Mahassen, Garden City (1951)
- Villa Valadji, Heliopolis:

== See also ==
- List of Egyptian architects
- Heliopolis (Cairo Suburb)
- Heliopolis style
