= Henry Habib Ayrout =

Egyptian sociologist

Henry Habib Ayrout, S.J. (1907 – April 10, 1969) was an author, educator, and Jesuit priest in Egypt.

His father Habib Ayrout was an Egyptian architect of Syrian Aleppine descent practicing in Cairo, Egypt. After being educated in Paris as an engineer-architect, he participated in the planning and construction of Heliopolis (Cairo suburb). His two brothers Charles Ayrout and Max Ayrout were also architects practicing in Cairo.

Ayrout was an educator and sociologist who established the Catholic Association for Schools of Egypt in 1940. His study of the Egypt's fellahin, The Egyptian Peasant, was first published in French in 1938 and is regarded as a major work on the subject. He was a noted advocate for land reform in Egypt. Ayrout was rector of the Jesuit College in Faggala from 1962 until his death. He was the founder of the Association of Upper Egypt for Education and Development.

Critique

According to professor Timothy Mitchell, Ayrout authored his disseration (later turned into book) on the Egyptian peasant without firsthand experience in rural Egypt. Born and raised in Cairo, he departed Egypt discreetly in 1926 at the age of eighteen, defying his father's wishes for him to pursue a career in architecture, the family profession. Ayrout embarked on twelve years of education at a Jesuit college in Lyon. His exhaustive study on the Egyptian peasant emerged as a dissertation a decade later, drawing insights from works like Winifred Blackman's The Fellahin of Upper Egypt. and correspondences with former school acquaintances in Cairo whose fathers owned substantial agricultural estates. Remarkably, Ayrout never physically ventured into rural Egypt during the book's composition.

Mitchell further argued that Ayrout's book relies on an "ahistorical method" and includes "racial vocabulary" borrowed from Gustave Le Bon's scientific racism.
