= Roger Khawam =

Roger Khawam in 1992

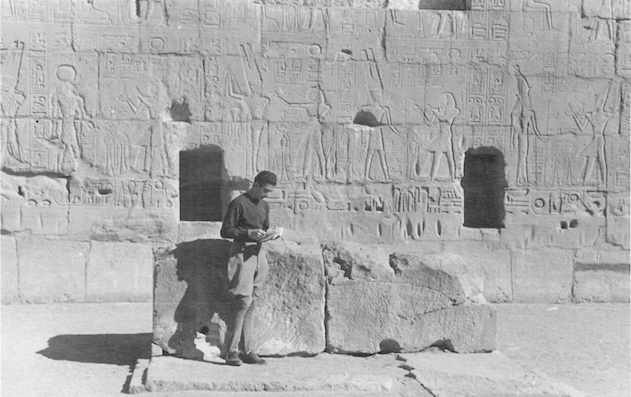
Roger Khawam on site in 1940

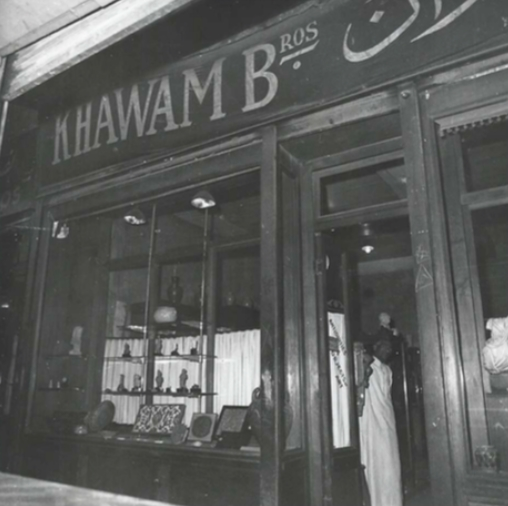
The Khawam Brothers shop in 1950

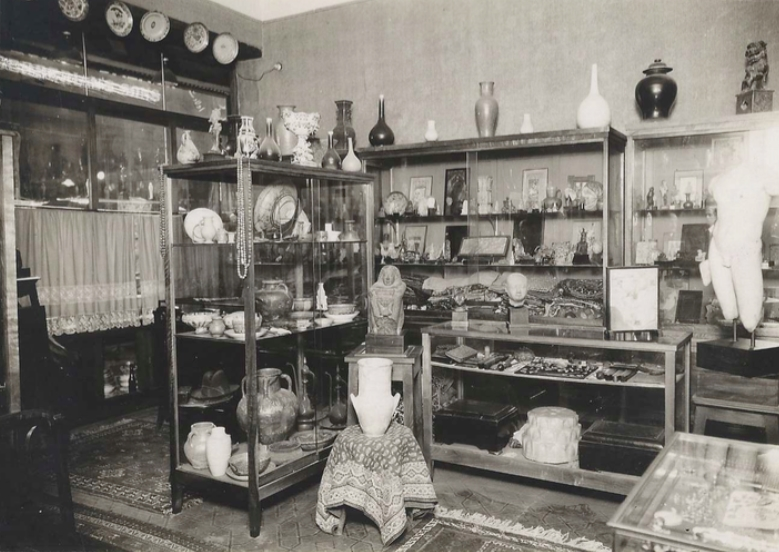
The interior of the Khan el-Khalili shop in Cairo, 1950

Roger Khawam (1922–2016) was an Egyptian Egyptologist and antiquities dealer.

== Early life ==
Roger Khawam was born in the affluent Garden City, Cairo, on 19 April 1922. His family were of Syrian Christian origins and moved to Egypt in 1850 when Roger's grandfather, Sélim Khawam, started a jewellery shop near the Ramses railway station in Cairo. They later became involved in the antiquities business. Roger Khawam received his early education at the Lycée Français du Caire from 1929 and subsequently in Paris where he went to learn mathematics and chemistry. Boutros Boutros-Ghali was a childhood friend and Omar Sharif was a cousin.

Khawam was familiar with the antiquities trade from a young age, taking holidays at the pyramids and watching his father Joseph attend to rich Americans at his showroom at the Khan el-Khalili souq, but he only decided to become an Egyptologist after Emile Gaston Chassinat dissuaded him from becoming an aerobatic pilot instead. He had learned to fly while in Paris for his studies. Accordingly, from 1945 to 1950 he studied the skills required of an Egytologist at the Sorbonne's École pratique des hautes études and the Institut Catholique de Paris, such as Coptic, numismatics, hieratic, and German. He already knew Arabic, English and French.

== Career ==
In 1955, Khawam took over the family business. He developed an extensive network of contacts that brought him new finds including farmers who found things in their fields and he toured archaeological digs looking for new pieces. He became an expert at spotting fakes. He told his sons to always look at the object, not the hand that held it. Customers included the Louvre, the Metropolitan Museum of Art and the Queen Mother and her ladies-in-waiting. He was a member of the Egypt Exploration Society and the Société Française d'Egyptologie.

In 1977, after the Egyptian authorities introduced laws that restricted the sale and export of antiquities, Khawam moved the firm to Paris where it still trades as Khawam Brothers.

Khawam was known for his charm, good manners and dapper appearance, always wearing a full suit whatever the heat. He shrank from publicity and spent his weekends studying Egyptology and drawing scarab inscriptions. He was a gourmet who enjoyed fine wine and whisky. He retired in 2005 as one of the foremost dealers in Egyptian antiquities of his time.

His library of Egyptology was sold in Paris in 2012.

== Family ==
Khawam married Elise Roger in 1950, a French governess that he had met in a Parisian cafe in 1949. Elise died in 2012. They had two sons, Roland and Bertrand.

== Death ==
Khawam died in Paris on 22 April 2016. He was survived by his sons.
