= Niqula Haddad =

Niqula Haddad was a Syrian socialist, and the brother-in-law of Farah Antun.

== Early life ==
Niqula Haddad was born into an Orthodox Christian family in 1870.

== Education ==
Haddad went to the American secondary school at Sidon and later studied pharmacy at the Syrian Protestant College in Beirut.

== Career ==
Sometime after 1900, Haddad moved to Egypt and married Farah Antun's sister, Ruza. Later on, he worked for his brother-in-law's journal, al-Jami'ah, in New York. After the journal's failure, Haddad returned to Egypt and continued his writing career there. He eventually published a ladies' magazine, al-Sayyidat, from 1948 to 1950. During this time, he also edited for the magazine al-Muqtataf. In 1906 he published a novel titled Hawa al-Jadida aw Yvonne Monar (The New Eve, or Yvonne Monar).

== Politics ==
Like some other prominent socialists, Haddad believed in a planned economy and pointed to the Egyptian government's control over utilities like railroads and telephones as evidence for its plausibility. Haddad believed socialism should be implemented through democratic means, in which a socialist party educates the people sufficiently to win power in the government and implement socialist policies.

== Death ==
Niqula Haddad died in 1954.
