= Gaston Zananiri =

Egyptian scholar, historian, and poet

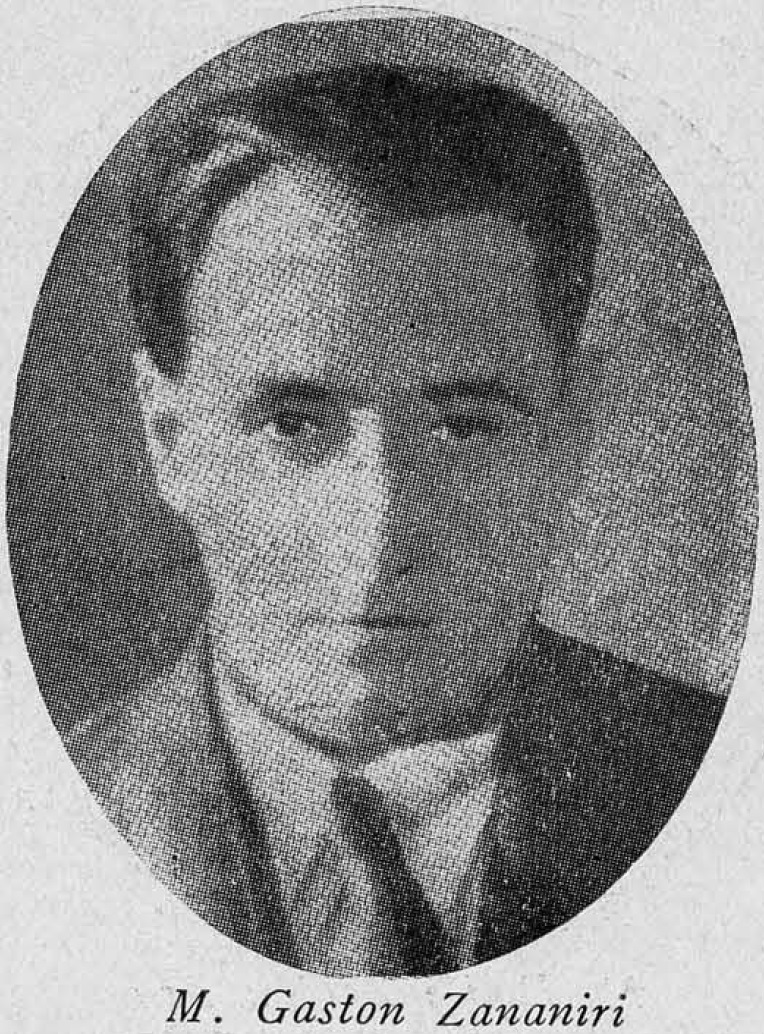
- Gaston Zananiri, writer and historian from Alexandria, Egypt.
- Born: 1904; Alexandria, Egypt Province, Ottoman Empire
- Died: 1996 (aged 91–92); France
- Occupations: Historian, poet, journalist, civil servant

Gaston Zananiri (Arabic: جاستون زنانيري, 1904 – 1996) was an eminent scholar, historian, and poet of Alexandria, Egypt.

== Life ==
Gaston Zananiri was born in 1904 in the city of Alexandria in Egypt. His father Georges Zananiri Pasha (1863–1956) was Secretary General of the Sanitary Maritime and Quarantine Board of Egypt. He belonged to a Syrian Melkite family which had migrated to Egypt from Syria centuries earlier. Gaston's mother was Marie Ines Bauer, of Hungarian Jewish extraction on her father's side and Italian on her mother's side. She converted to Christianity and moved in Zionist circles in Egypt and Palestine in the early 20th century, Gaston would also follow in his mothers footsteps and associate himself with Zionist movements in Palestine. In his youth Gaston attended Victoria College, Alexandria, where he received his education. Gaston worked for the Egyptian Foreign Office from 1940 to 1950. In 1948 Gaston founded the 'Alexandrian center of studies and in 1951 he moved to Paris in France and became a Dominican priest.

== Works ==
In 1939 Gaston published L'Esprit Méditerranéen dans le Proche Orient. Gaston's life work was entitled Dictionnaire général de la francophonie. He completed his memoirs in 1982.
