= Henri Boulad =

Egyptian-Jesuit priest (1931–2023)

The Rev. Henri Boulad SJ
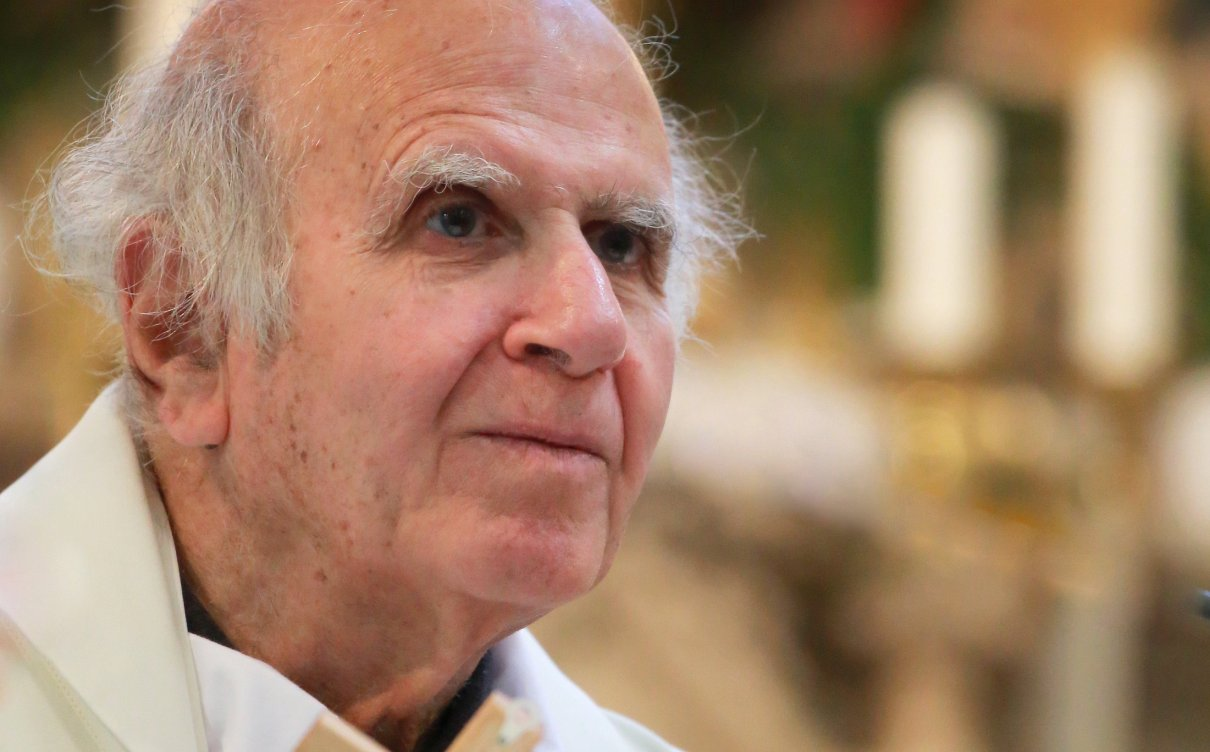

Personal life
- Born: Henri Boulad; 28 August 1931 Alexandria, Egypt
- Died: 14 June 2023 (aged 91) Cairo, Egypt
- Occupation: Priest, author

Religious life
- Religion: Catholic

Henri Boulad, SJ (Egyptian Arabic: هنرى بولاد; 28 August 1931 – 14 June 2023) was an Egyptian-Hungarian priest in the Jesuit order, author, and commentator who lived in Egypt. He was a member of the Melkite Greek Catholic Church.

== Biography ==
Henri Boulad was born in Alexandria, Egypt on 28 August 1931. His father came from a Syrian Christian family originally from Damascus, but settled in Egypt in 1860 and his mother was Italian. The Boulad family belongs to the old Damascene bourgeoisie and has produced many clerics including Father Abdel Massih (Damascus) and Father Antoune Boulad (Monastery of the Holy Savior, Lebanon).

In 1950, Boulad entered the novitiate of the Jesuits in Bikfaya, Lebanon. From 1952 to 1954, he studied at the Juniorate of Laval (France), then, from 1954 to 1957, he studied philosophy at the Jesuit scholasticate of Chantilly, Oise, still in France. He taught for two years at the Collège de la Sainte Famille in Cairo. After a cycle of theological studies (from 1959 to 1963 in Lebanon), he was ordained a priest according to the Melkite rite. In 1965, he participated in a Jesuit training program in Pomfret, Connecticut and obtained a PhD in School psychology from the University of Chicago.

Boulad returned to Egypt in 1967. He later became the religious superior of the Jesuits of Alexandria, then the provincial of the Jesuits of the Near East, and professor of theology in Cairo. In 2004, he became rector of CSF of Jesuits in Cairo.

Boulad was strongly committed to serving the poor, Christians and Muslims, a commitment that continued with his involvement in Caritas. From 1984 to 1995, he was director of Caritas Egypt, and president of Caritas North Africa and Middle East. From 1991 to 1995, he was Vice President of Caritas International for the Middle East and North Africa.

In 2007, he wrote a letter to Pope Benedict XVI entitled SOS for the Church today, which was published in 2010. He called for a revamp of the Church and proposed a theological and catechetical reform, a pastoral reform and a spiritual renewal, which should be discussed at a synod of the world church. In 2010, he urged Europe "not to lose its soul".

As a fine expert of Islam, which he has lived with since childhood in Egypt, he was very critical of some of his contemporary orientations, while insisting that the dialogue between Christians and Muslims must continue, but not in its current form, which he argued is only lies and compromise, and therefore is not dialogue and exasperates it. Defender and human rights activist, he was a privileged observer of the Arab Spring, and particularly the Egyptian Revolution of 2011. He called on the West not to give in to cynicism, to support people's aspirations for freedom, and not to ally themselves with religious fundamentalists.

Boulad published nearly 30 books in 15 languages, particularly in French, Arabic, German and Hungarian.

Boulad was promoted to the Commander of the Order of Academic Palms. In 2017, he received Hungarian citizenship and praised Hungary's current policy of defending traditional Christian communities in Europe and elsewhere as a sign for the future. In 2019 he received the Hungarian Order of Merit.

Boulad died on 14 June 2023, at the age of 91.

== Bibliography (selection) ==
- Jésus de Nazareth : Qui es-tu ? (Éditions Anne Sigier, 2006) ISBN 2891294785
- Le Mystère de l’Être (Éditions Anne Sigier, 2006) ISBN 2891294831
- L'Islamisme (Fidelite, 2004, avec Philippe Lenoir, Charles Delhez et Joseph Maïla) ISBN 2873562927
- Changer le monde : Expérience mystique et engagement (Saint-Augustin, 2004) ISBN 2880113393
- Amour et Sexualité (Éditions Anne Sigier, 2003) ISBN 2891294246
- L'Amour Fou de Dieu (Éditions Anne Sigier, 2002) ISBN 2891293622
- L'Amour et le Sacré (Éditions Anne Sigier, 2002) ISBN 2891294254
- Chasteté et consécration (Éditions Anne Sigier, 2003) ISBN 9782891294263
- Les dimensions de l'amour (Albin Michel, 1996) ISBN 2226087311
- La foi et le sens (Éditions Médiaspaul, 2014) ISBN 9782894209455
- La quête du sens (2022) (ISBN 978-2-98-208880-1)
