= Farah Antun =

Lebanese intellectual and author

- Born: Farah Antun; 1874; Tripoli, Ottoman Empire (modern-day Lebanon)
- Died: 1922 (aged 47–48); Cairo, Egypt
- Occupations: Writer, Journalist
- Writing career
- Genres: Philosophy, Secularism
- Subjects: Secularism, Equality, Liberalism
- Notable work: Al-Jamia (magazine)

Farah Antun (Arabic: فرح انطون; 1874–1922), also spelled Farah Antoun, was among the first Lebanese Christians to openly argue for secularism and equality regardless of religious affiliation. He also, though uncommon for his background, argued against Arab nationalism. Antun became popular for his magazine, Al Jamiah, and his public debate with Muhammad Abduh over conflicting worldviews.

== Bibliography ==
=== Early family life and educational background ===
Farah Antun was born in 1874 to a Lebanese, Eastern Orthodox Christian family. He had three sisters: Rose, Mariana, Ramza and a younger brother. His father, Elias Antun, was a lumber merchant in Tripoli, where only a fourth of the population was Christian, the rest being Muslim. His father traded mostly by sea, and so Antun's family lived in a Christian dominated area of Tripoli near the sea, named al-Mina. American Protestant and Catholic missionaries opened schools in Lebanon, but after attaining a primary certification in 1888, he enrolled in Kiftin in Tripoli, a boys' school attached to the Orthodox monastery. The school taught the languages of Arabic, Turkish, French, and English. Other subjects included history, geography, mathematics and Muslim legal sciences. He spent four years there, entering when he was 13 and leaving at the age of 16, when the school closed. He especially excelled in French and would often spend more time reading magazines, books and articles in French rather than doing schoolwork. He spent very little time learning English or focusing on the Arabic-Islamic heritage of the region. He did, however, report that Kiftin was very religiously tolerant, and catered to the religious activities of all students and staff, something unusual for the area at the time.

When the school closed, Antun's father brought him into the lumber trade as an apprentice. For the next two years, Antun traveled throughout Lebanon, but was restless, and eventually told his parents that he was leaving the merchant trade. Not long after, he took up a teaching position at al-Madrasah al-Ahliyah, another Orthodox school in Tripoli. However, he often had only a handful of students of his own sect and was underpaid. While teaching, many of his articles were published and he began to translate French materials. His desire grew to enter the field of Journalism and so he left his job as a teacher in Syria to pursue his new dream.

=== Life in Egypt and entrance into journalism ===
In 1897, Farah Antun and Rashid Rida left Syria to move to Egypt. Antun arrived in Alexandria to study journalism, upholding a secular identity, while Rida, a Muslim, became a disciple of Muhammad Abduh. However, historian Fawaz Gerges characterizes Antun as 'both a friend and an intellectual adversary" of both Abduh and Rida. Soon after Antun left for Egypt, his father died because of gangrene and it is also reported that his younger brother died by typhoid fever, though it is unclear when. Antun's mother and sisters came to live with him in Alexandria after Ilyas's death, where he was the sole provider for the family until Rose began to teach. Interested in journalism, he began to write articles for Al-Ahram under different names as well as translating materials in French to Arabic for Rida. Antun continued to work for Al-Ahram, and when it was moved to Cairo in 1899, he was given the position of editor of the branch in Alexandria; however, it was closed only a few months later. He started a magazine called Al-Jami'ah while in Alexandria and eventually moved to New York, only to move back to Cairo in 1909.

Antun never married and his mother outlived him when he died in 1922 at the age of 48 of heart trouble.

== Publications ==
=== Phases of Al-Jami'ah ===
Al-Jami'ah was created by Antun in 1899 in Alexandria, after the Alexandria branch of Al-Ahram closed, and disappeared around 1910 in Cairo. The magazine began as a bi-monthly publication and was originally called Al-Jami'ah al-Uthmaniyah (Arabic: The Ottoman Community). In the second year it became a monthly publication, and from then on it was inconsistently published, as seen in the fact that only five issues were published in 1902, six in 1903, and two in 1904. Then, after a year of no publications, he moved to New York and again irregularly published issues of Al-Jami'ah from 1906 to 1909. While in New York he also published a daily called Al-Jami'ah al-Yawmiyah (The Daily Community) for six months and then a weekly called Al-Jami'ah al-Usbu'iyah (Arabic: The Weekly Community) from 1907 to 1909. He returned to Egypt in 1909 and published two more issues of Al-Jami'ah before it disappeared in the next year.

=== Behind the scenes of Al-Jami'ah ===
Farah Antun was the sole contributor to Al-Jami'ah except for occasional other writers and his nephew Mikha'il Karam who worked with Antun for two years in Egypt. Possible reasons for the irregularity of his publications was that Antun wrote, edited, printed and even mailed out his magazines all on his own, in addition to keeping track of the financial records with no assistant. New York was the exception to this, as Antun had the full-time help of his brother-in-law, Niqula Haddad.

=== Other publications ===
Farah and his sister Rose also published a women's magazine called al-Sayyidat wa al-Banat (Arabic: The Ladies and Girls) between 1903 and 1906 in Alexandria.

== Political views ==
=== Saladin ===
The great Muslim hero of the Crusades was a Kurd, Saladin (1138–93). Having defeated the crusaders in 1187, and become sovereign and founder of the Ayyubid dynasty in Egypt and Syria, Salah al-Din (Saladin) has been for a century the object of an intense glorification in the Arab world. Farah Antun's play Sultan Saladin and the Kingdom of Jerusalem (1914) illustrates how the historical figure of Saladin came to be presented as a prophet of Arab nationalism. Antun was a Syrian Christian who presents Saladin as the champion of a just jihad against the Crusaders and as a faithful upholder of the virtues of wisdom, determination, and frankness, calling on the peoples of all Arab countries to unite against Western imperialists. The refusal of Antun's Saladin to become embroiled in quarrels within Europe had obvious echoes in World War I and caused the play to be censored by the British authorities in Egypt.

=== Secularism and Western influence ===
A distinct view of Farah Antun is that one is great in spite of their education, not because of it. In examples of this, he brings up men such as Ibn Sina, Ibn Rushd and al-Ghazali, all of whom, in his view, would have achieved more impressive accomplishments had they had the resources of 19th-century French education. And although he was not interested in the religious aspects of Islamic culture, he often quoted or referenced Muslim historians like Ibn Khaldun, as well as al-Ghazali, in "Al-Jami'ah". He also argued that Ibn Rushd was the first to discover the principle of "survival of the fittest," not Darwin. But he did not feel that Muslims needed to defend Islamic history to the West but at the same time had little to no interaction with Muslim thinkers of his time.

Antun largely rejected Arabic heritage, whether Muslim or Christian, as he considered it irrelevant to his interests and needs. He believed that the East was once the place to turn to for knowledge and research, but now the West was taking that over and so it became necessary to use it.

Antun's only foreign language was French and his experience in French was limited to 18th- and 19th-century literature. When reading French critique of Islam, he tended to agree with their criticisms. He was largely affected by French intellectuals and philosophers of the Enlightenment, such as Montesquieu and Voltaire. He was also interested in French Romantics as well as the rationalist traditions of men like Auguste Comte, Ernest Renan and Jules Simon. From each, Antun took specific things and often inserted them into Al-Jami'ah. These ranged from the skeptical attitude of religious institutions of Renan to the ideas of the emancipation of women and educational reforms of Simon.

Through translations, Antun was also exposed to literature of English, German and Russian in addition to the writings of Dawn, Spencer, Nietzsche and Tolstoy.

=== Regional background ===
Because he was a Christian living during the late Ottoman Empire, his family was subjected to dhimmi restrictions, such as extra taxes, legal disadvantages, and sometimes limited job opportunities. Many Orthodox Christians in Syria desired to live among Muslims in a secular state, and with the fall of the Ottoman Empire in 1918, this opened the door to Syrian intellectuals calling for exactly that.

== Debate with Abduh ==
Antun's debate with Muhammad Abduh in 1902 to 1903 was the high point of his career, yet may have been considered only a small event in the life of the Mufti of Egypt, Muhammad Abduh. Abduh had also read Western social thinkers like Renan, Rousseau, Spencer and Tolstoy, just as Antun, but coming to different conclusions on what that meant for Arab thought. Abduh believed that Islam needed to be central to Middle Eastern society and its core principles and tenets never to be comprised, while also remaining fluid and selectively borrowing from the West. The debate between the two was sparked by an article by Antun on the biography and thoughts of the Muslim medieval philosopher and jurist Ibn Rushd (1126–1198), in which he argued that Islamic orthodoxy had hindered the spirit of free intellectual inquiry. The debate then took off when Abduh published a rebuttal to Antun's article of Ibn Rushd titled al-Manar and Antun decided to respond in an effort to catapult his inconspicuous career into the public sphere, hopefully to also receive attention for "al-Jam'iah". Antun focused solely on compiling responses to Abduh for three months, studying Islamic classics for the first time day and night. In his response, he quoted al-Ghazali, and other medieval Islamic scholars, that would support his own view of Islamic theology. As an Islamic scholar, Abduh rarely used a reference book and used mostly his memory to reply to Antun, mostly in his spare time and in between other important tasks, whereas Antun devoted all his time and efforts to the debate. Antun, like Renan, argued that Islamic theology was based upon two assertions: complete freedom of the creator from all limitations and the rejection of any secondary causes that would limit the creator's freedoms. Because these beliefs basically implied that every event in the universe is a result of God's exercise of free will, Antun felt that they discouraged scientific and philosophical research of the universe. Antun also argued the part of Greek and some Muslim philosophers who regarded God as only an initial actor in the course of the universe and creator of natural laws, who then left mankind to run their own lives and explore as they so desired. He emphasized that all religions were based upon the same principles, only differing on minor issues and so disliked to debate over the polemics between them, and that science and religion were working towards the same goal, the betterment of mankind. As long as both science and religion stayed in their own realms, there would be no conflict between them. Antun called for religion, a personal matter, to be separate from science and reason. Abduh refuted Antun's claim that Islamic theology supported the belief that the unrestricted will of God was directly responsible for every event in the universe. Similar to the Mu'tazili argumentations, Abduh argued that in Islam regularities of the universe, human reason or logic and secondary causes were not necessarily rejected. Science and philosophy were wholly a part of Islam, a religion of reason and faith. He equated the Western concept of natural laws of the universe with the '"sunnah" of God.' Additionally, Abduh believed that the Qur’an anticipated certain Darwinist concepts, such as survival of the fittest and the struggle for existence. Though this was somewhat controversial with the more conservative Muslims, it was largely ignored as Abduh moved on to defaming Christianity. Antun seemed to make a brief suggestion that the West was more tolerant of intellectual inquiry than the Muslim world, and Abduh, misunderstanding what Antun meant, refuted the foundations of Christianity and listed Western intellectuals who had been persecuted by Christian authorities. He proclaimed that Islam, however, had always protected other religions and had been more tolerant of others in general, and so was the best religion for the world. Both Antun and Abduh argued for the use of reason and rational methods, and they both believed that science and religion did not conflict. In addition to that, they also believed in educating women in order to improve Middle Eastern societies through the home and through schools, and that social reform would be more productive for change than political activism. The details of both of these ideas, however, were very different for Antun and Abduh. Stephen Sheehi states that this debate marks a central theme in the writing of nahdah intellectuals. The difference in their overall goals was that Abduh desired to keep Islam as the centerpiece of modern society, while Antun preferred religion to be separate from society and, overall, science and intellectual thought. Despite this difference, Sheehi states, they both maintain the same epistemological reference points for Arab social renewal that poses a Western inflected notion of progress as the teleological endpoint of both of their arguments.

On the other hand, according to Mohammed Gamal Abdelnour and Umran Khan in their new translation of Abduh's work comparing Christianity and Islam, Abduh aptly refuted Antun's point that the West was more tolerant of intellectual inquiry than Islamic civilization through a cogent historical argument, tracing the persecution of free thinkers by the Catholic and Protestant Church and Europe's religious wars. Moreover, in Abduh's own comparison of the two religions, he equally criticized Christian and Muslim populations, as needed, for failing to bring about modern reform. However, Antun did not engage in such a sophisticated or nuanced historical argument and followed Renan in blaming Islamic sectarianism for a greater portion of the world's ills than Christianity.

Whereas Donald Reid has implied that Abduh misunderstood what Antun meant, that claim itself distorts the historical context and Antun's and Abduh's respective positions within their intellectual milieu. Antun was a minor journalist furiously trying to keep pace with a luminary and esteemed giant, the Grand Mufti of Egypt and foremost Islamic reformer and thinker of the day, Abduh. As a result, if we rely solely on Reid's account for an interpretation of this debate, it would lead us to a skewed understanding. In fact, Abduh's broad and deep grasp of Christian theological and Western political history (namely, that Protestantism was not more tolerant to freedom of thought but instead sent free-thinkers and heretics such as Servetus to burn at the stake) agrees exactly with the Calvin University's Henry Meeter Center, which states that there was "a common desire on the part of both Roman Catholics and Protestants alike to jail Servetus, put him to death, and to destroy his writings." Despite Reid's opinion, Abduh demonstrated an astute recognition that liberal secularism colluded with Western religion in a two-pronged imperial attack. Such a ploy worked to distance Muslim populations further from their religious foundations and diminish Islam in the spiritual life of the colonized Muslim world at the turn of the twentieth century.
