= Sélim Khawam =

Egyptian antiquity dealer

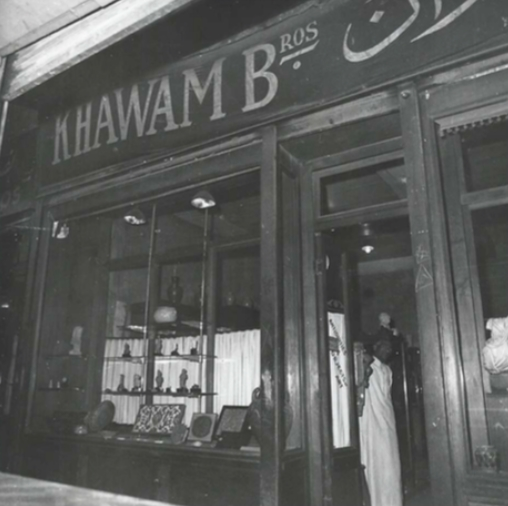
The Khawam Brothers shop in 1950

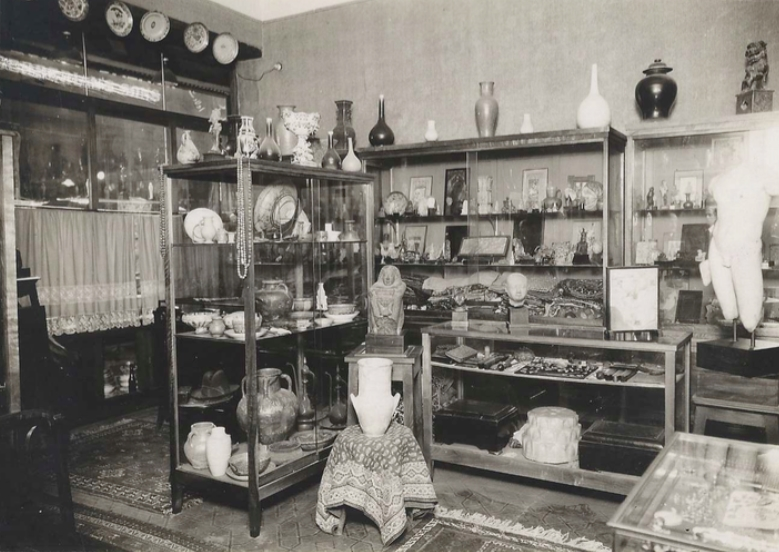
The interior of the Khan el-Khalili shop in Cairo, 1950

Sélim Khawam was a dealer in Egyptian antiquities and the founder of the firm that became Khawam Brothers.

== Early life ==
Khawam's family were of Syrian Christian origins and moved to Egypt in 1850 when Sélim Khawam started a jewellery shop near the Ramses railway station in Cairo. They later became involved in the antiquities business.
