= Ernest Jaspar =

Belgian architect (1898-1939)

Ernest Jaspar Baron, OL, LH
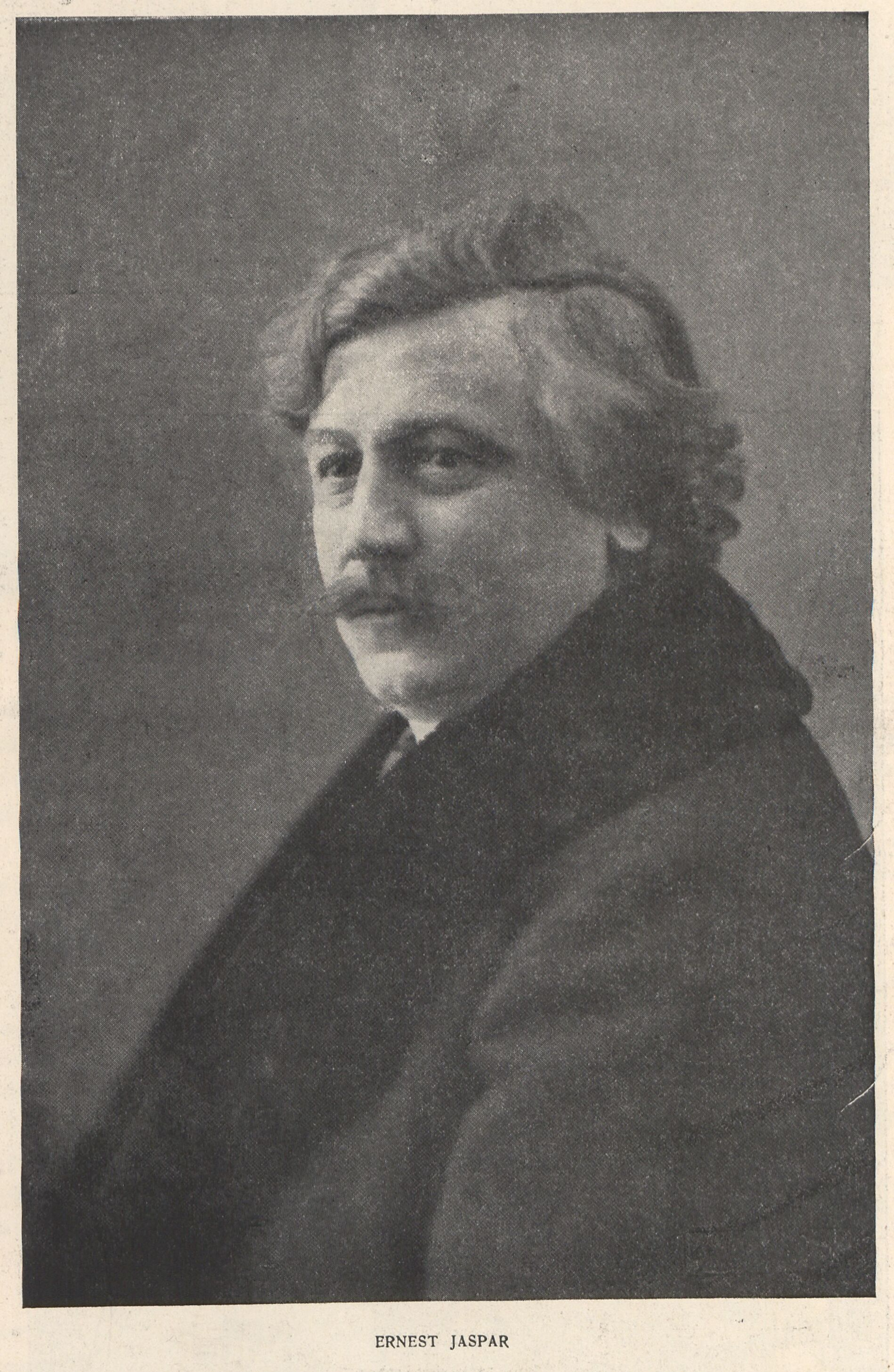
- Born: Ernest Maximilien Jaspar; 5 January 1876; Schaerbeek, Belgium
- Died: 19 August 1940 (aged 64); Brussels
- Citizenship: Belgian
- Education: Royal Academy of Fine Arts, Brussels
- Occupation: Architect
- Years active: 1898-1939
- Spouse: Marguerite Coopman
- Children: 4, including Marcel-Henri Jaspar
- Relatives: Henri Jaspar (brother); Jules Jaspar (brother)
- Projects: Heliopolis, Cairo; University Foundation Building, Brussels; Hotel de La Régence, Brussels; Osmania University, Hyderabad

Ernest Jaspar, Baron, OL, LH (January 5, 1876- August 19, 1940) was a Belgian architect, known for being the Principal Architect of Cairo's Heliopolis suburb, and thus for creating the "Heliopolis style", a blend of Persian, Moorish and European Neoclassicism. Jaspar adapted his style to the locations of his buildings. He displayed great eclecticism, mixing Art Nouveau, Art Deco, and the academic style of Beaux-Arts architecture, blending them with local architectural traditions, notably Arab elements in Egypt and Indo-Muslim elements in India. His last Belgian projects became Modernist and exhibited British influence.

== Early life and education ==
Ernest Maximilien Jaspar was the son of Pierre Jaspar (1843-1926) and Elisabeth Haeseleer (b. 1841). His family was prominent in Belgian politics and his father, as a businessman, was involved in the public works projects of the "Builder King", King Leopold II. Ernest was the middle child of seven. His younger brother Jules became a diplomat, member of the Belgian Resistance and Soviet spy; his older brother Henri was the Belgian prime minister from 1926 to 1931.

From 1893 to 1898, Ernest trained at the Royal Academy of Fine Arts, Brussels, where he was heavily influenced by one of his professors, Joseph-Jean Naert, a specialist in the Neo-renaissance style. Upon graduation, Jaspar was awarded the Grand Prize in architecture.

== Career ==
Jaspar was immediately hired by Ernest Acker to work on the Belgian pavilion at the Paris Exposition Universelle of 1900. Jaspar then won some commissions to build houses in Brussels then, in 1902, he met the Belgian engineer Léon Rolin.

Rolin had just established the General Construction Company-Rolin, aka Leon Rolin & Co., in Egypt, where successive rulers had long been working to modernize their cities. They had been importing builders and craftsmen since 1850 but the ever-growing population had created dangerous slums which, i many cases, had no electricity, running water, or sewer systems. Now, they looked to Europeans to design and build new roads, railways and neighbourhoods. Rolin had won many contracts and hired Jaspar to design the Matossian Tobacco Factory at Giza, the Khedive’s private railway station at Wardeyan, several villas at Koubbeh Gardens, a block of flats at Gezira and, assisting Austrian architect Eduard Matasek, the Dubara Palace.

=== Heliopolis ===
Jaspar was put to work designing the new Egyptian Stock Exchange building but that was shelved when he and Rolin were hired by another Belgian who was moving into Cairo, the industrialist Édouard Empain. Empain wanted to build an entire suburb and, in 1905, his company, Chemins de fer de la Basse-Egypte bought 2,500 hectares (6,200 acres) of inexpensive desert 10 kilometres (6.2 mi) to the northeast of Cairo. Noting the work that Jaspar was doing for Rolin, Empain hired him as Principal Architect on the project.

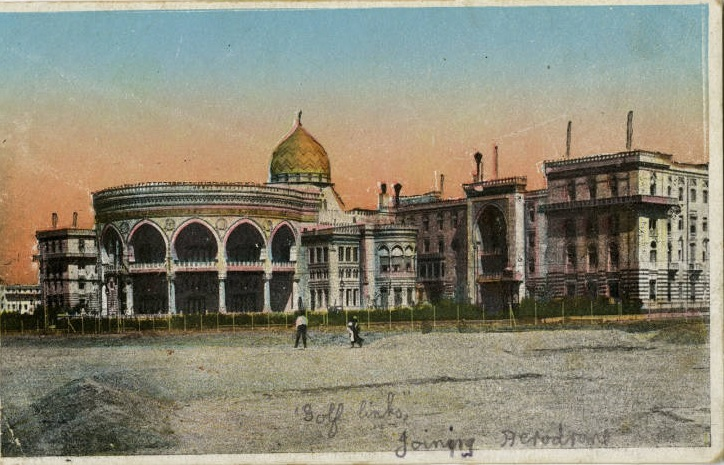
Postcard of the Heliopolis Palace Hotel

Jaspar's first design, in accordance with Empain's vision, was an oasis in the desert, a "city of luxury and leisure", with 8% of its area reserved for public gardens, parks, and playgrounds. It was to be composed of two separate oases connected to the center of Cairo by a tramline. The oasis nearest to Cairo would be a tourist area, with the Heliopolis Palace Hotel surrounded by luxurious homes. The other oasis would be factories and workers’ homes. In 1907, Empain experienced financial difficulties. British financier Ernest Cassel stepped in and the city was redesigned. In the new design, working with the British urban planner Ebenezer Howard, Jaspar created a Garden City. Landmarks were connected by broad avenues, a la Paris, and entertainment facilities like Luna Amusement Park, golf courses and the Heliopolis Sporting Club were built to attract Europeans. It naturally had water, drains and electricity, and there was rental housing in a range of innovative designs targeting specific social classes with detached and terraced villas, apartment buildings, tenement blocks with balcony access, and workers' bungalows.

At the time, Cairo was multi-cultural, with people of many ethnicities and relgions. To reflect this, Jaspar blended Persian, Moorish and European Neoclassicism to create what is now known as the "Heliopolis style". He brought in ten French, Belgian and Italian architects, notably Alexandre Marcel and Antonio Lasciac, to build many of the grand buildings—Marcel designed the Baron Empain Palace according to a Neo Hindu style modeled on Angkor Wat. Heliopolis had a very definite class division; the workers' apartment buildings were on the desert side and to ensure that local sensibilities were satisfied, Jaspar hired one Egyptian architect, Habib Ayrout. Jaspar designed many of the buildings himself, including the Prince Youssef Kamal Palace, the Heliopolis Sporting Club, the Collège du Sacré-Cœur, and the centerpiece of the entire suburb, the grand Heliopolis Palace Hotel.

=== Brussels ===
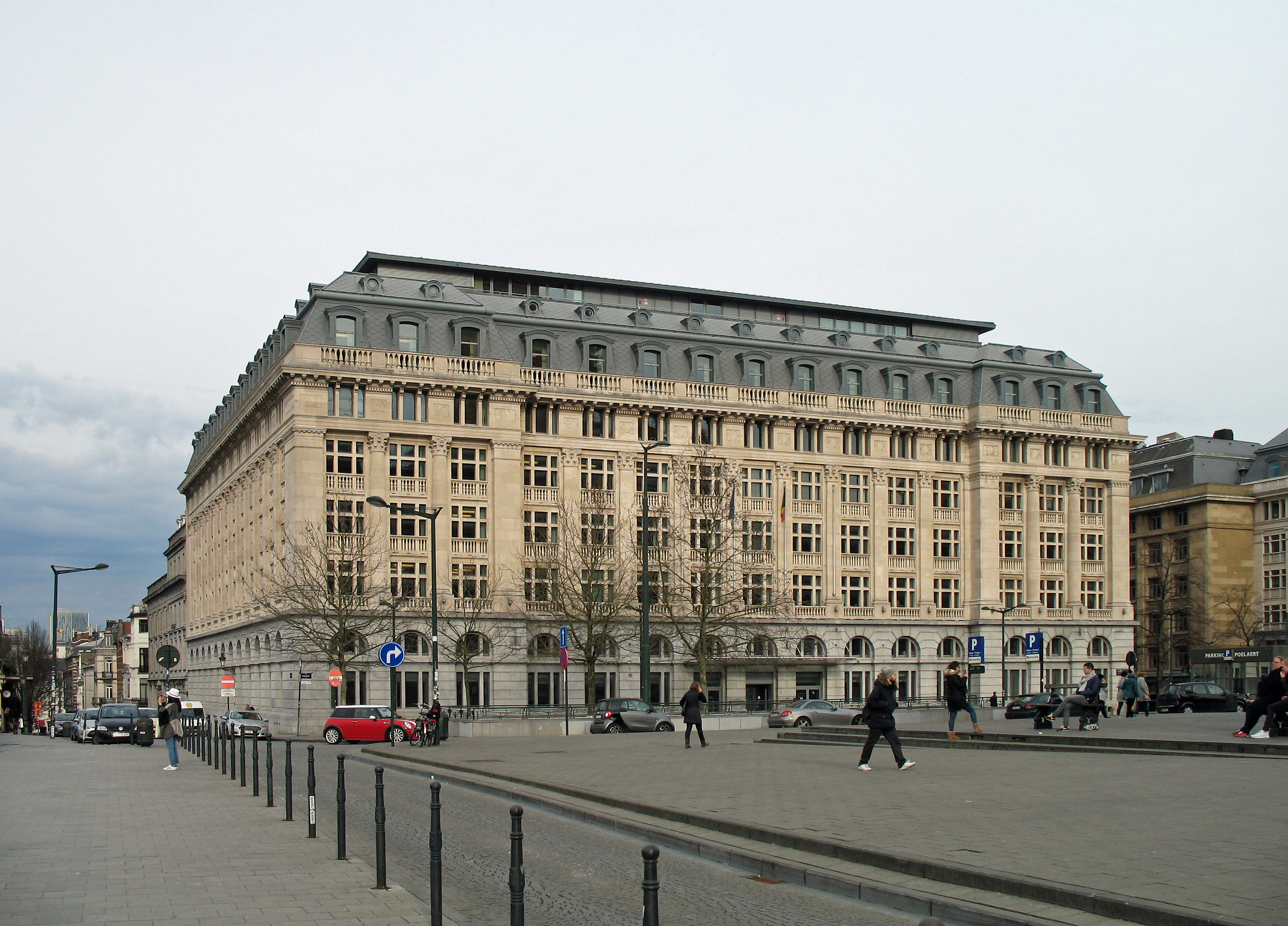
Hotel de La Régence, Brussels

With the outbreak of World War I, and the first phase of Heliopolis completed, Jaspar left Egypt in 1915. From the relative safety of northwest Brittany, he built his own house, in the Brussels suburb of Uccle. In 1919, he returned to Brussels and set to work on two major projects: the University Foundation Building, and the massive Hotel de La Régence (now the Labour Court).

In 1927, Édouard Empain hired him again; this time, Empain wanted to build a luxury resort on Lake Kivu, in what was then the Belgian Congo. Jaspar got as far as designing the Hotel des Volcans before Empain died in 1929. That coincided with the Great Depression and Empains sons could not continue with the project. The hotel was eventually completed in 1935, by other architects.

Also in 1927, the literary society Cercle de la Toison d'Or, which had acquired the former estate of the Gendebien family, commissioned Jaspar to transform the house into a club, which Jaspar did in the British style.

=== Hyderabad ===
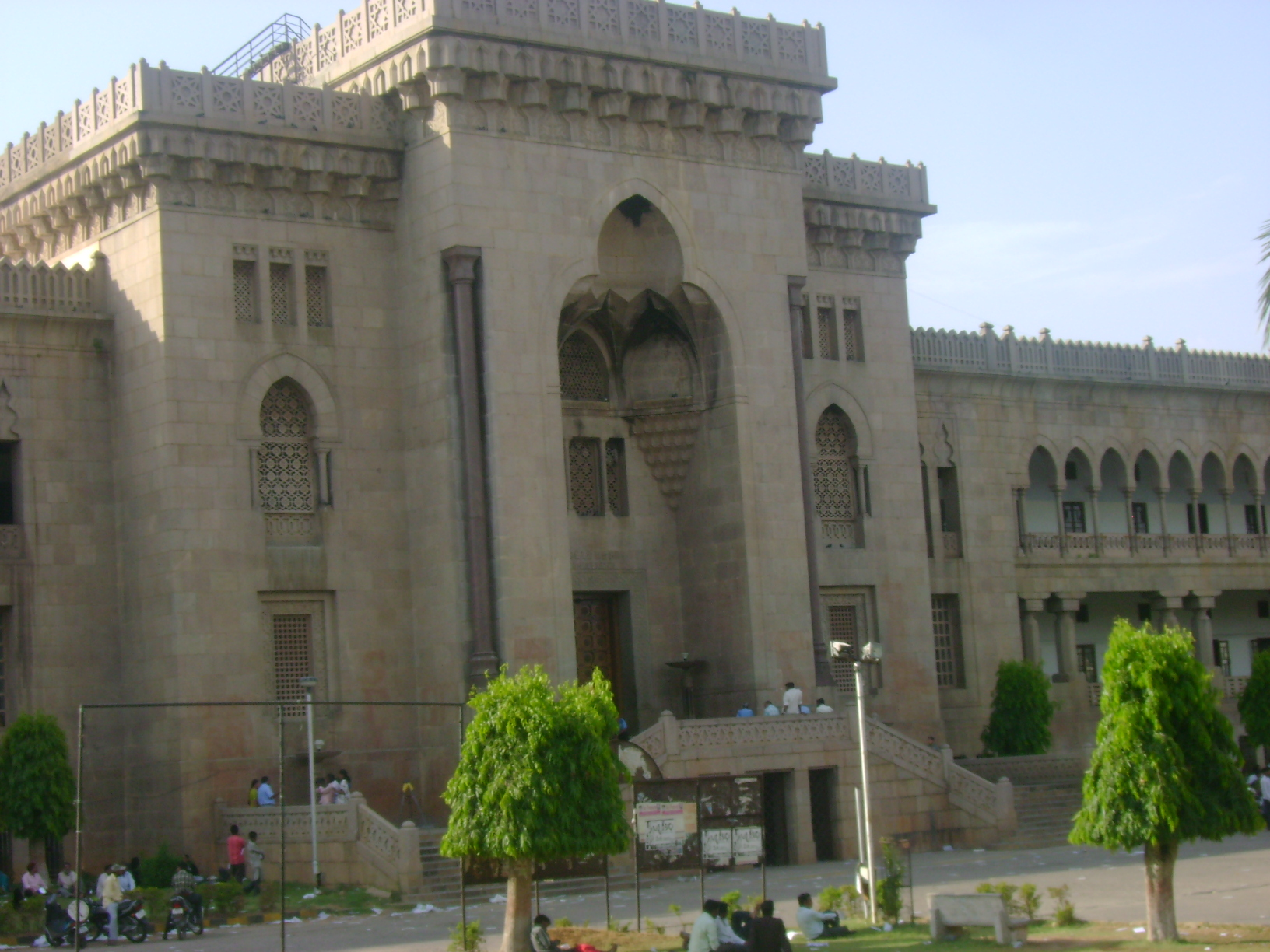
Arts College Building, Osmania University

In 1918, Mir Osman Ali Khan, the ruler of Hyderabad State, established Osmania University. He hired the Scottish urban planner Patrick Geddes to select and plan the site and, in 1924, chose Jaspar as the Principal Architect. Jaspar completed his plans in 1933; the first stone was laid in July 1934. Jaspar oversaw the construction of the Arts College Building, and then returned to Belgium, leaving the university's construction in the hands of the Chief Architect of Hyderabad State, Zain Yar Jung. However, Jaspar continued to work on the project for the rest of his life, returning to Hyderabad every year for three months to oversee progress.

Jaspar's last project was the Belgian Pavilion at the 1930 Exposition Internationale in Antwerp.

== Personal life and death ==
In July 1900, Jaspar married Marguerite Coopman (1878-1959), daughter of the Flemish poet Theophiel Coopman and niece of the sculptor Julien Dillens. They had four children, including the Belgian politician Marcel-Henri Jaspar.

Jaspar received many honours, including Commander of the Order of the Crown, Officer of the Order of Leopold, Knight of the Legion of Honour (France) and Commander of the Order of the Nile (Egypt). On April 11, 1940, he was granted hereditary nobility as well as the personal title of Baron. He died in Brussels four months later.

== Notable works (by year completed) ==
- Residence, Avenue Ducpétiaux 137, Brussels, 1900
- Residence, Rue Vandeweyer 125, 127, Brussels, 1902
- Residence, Avenue du Panthéon 40, Brussels, 1903
- Residence, 51 rue de l'Abbaye, Brussels, 1905
- Matossian Tobacco Factory, Giza, c 1905
- Chasseaud Villa, Cairo, 1907
- Dubara Palace, Garden City, Cairo, c 1907 (assisting)
- Khedive’s private railway station at Wardeyan, Alexandria, c 1907
- Gezira Mansions, Zamalek, Cairo, 1908
- Pagalah Building, Cairo, 1908
- Mme Bern House, Shubra, Cairo, 1909
- Egyptian Mortgage Fund Office, Qasr El Nil Street, Cairo, 1909
- Madame Birne Building (Chezireh House), Zamalek, Cairo, 1909
- Heliopolis, Master Plan, Cairo 1909-1914
- Prince Youssef Kamal Palace, Heliopolis, Cairo, 1909-1914
- Chimy Bey House, Heliopolis, Cairo, 1909-1914
- Mansour Shakour Pasha House, Heliopolis, Cairo, 1909-1914
- Cairo Electric Railways & Heliopolis Oases Company Building, Heliopolis, Cairo, 1909-1914
- Egyptian Ministry of Public Works Building, Heliopolis, Cairo, 1909-1914
- Izz al-Din Sharif Building, Heliopolis, Cairo, 1909-1914
- Aly Pacha Cherif Building, Heliopolis, Cairo, 1909-1914
- Heliopolis Palace Hotel, Cairo, 1909-1914
- Restaurant and shopping complex, Heliopolis, Cairo 1909-1914
- Sacred Heart of Jesus Copt Catholic Church, Heliopolis, Cairo, 1909-1914
- Sacred Heart School, Heliopolis, Cairo, 1909-1914
- Heliopolis Sporting Club, Heliopolis, Cairo, 1909-1914
- Kamel Toueg Building, Heliopolis, Cairo, 1909-1914
- Jaspar House, Rue Léo Errera, Uccle, 1919 (demolished 1955)
- University Foundation, rue d'Egmont, Brussels, 1923, 1926
- Hotel de La Régence, Place Poelaert, Brussels, 1928
- Cercle de la Toison d'Or Clubhouse, Brussels, 1927
- Hotel des Volcans, Goma, Congo, 1928 (original design)
- Osmania University, Hyderabad, India, 1933-1939
