= Dost =

Dost (alternatively Dhosth or Dosth) may refer to:

== Films ==
- Dost (1944 film), a Hindi film
- Dost (1954 film), a Hindi film
- Dost (1974 film), a Hindi film
- Dost (1989 film), a Hindi film
- Dhosth (2001 Malayalam film)
- Dost (2001 Tamil film)
- Dost (2004 film), a Telugu film

== People ==
- Dost Mohammad (disambiguation), several people
- Dost (surname), list of people with the surname

== Acronyms ==
- Democrats for Responsibility, Solidarity and Tolerance (Демократи за отговорност, свобода и толерантност, ДОСТ/DOST), political party in Bulgaria
- Dictionary of the Older Scottish Tongue
- Department of Science and Technology (Philippines)
- Degree Online Services Telangana, a degree admission process in Telangana, India

== Other uses ==
- 'Dost' (singular), a term used in Hindi, Urdu and Turkish for 'friend'
- Dost test, a six-factor child pornography guideline established in the case United States v. Dost in 1996
- Ashok Leyland Dost, a light commercial vehicle made by joint venture between Ashok Leyland and Nissan

== See also ==
- Dosti (disambiguation)
- Dostana (disambiguation)
- Thou, for the archaic form thou dost meaning "you do"
