= Collège du Sacré-Coeur =

Collège Sacré-Coeur may refer to various Catholic schools and colleges:

- Collège du Sacré-Coeur (Egypt)
- Collège du Sacré-Coeur (New Brunswick), a former religious college that was merged with the Université de Moncton and the New Brunswick Community College
- Collège du Sacré-Coeur (Sherbrooke)
