= Marcel-Henri Jaspar =

Belgian politician

- Photograph of Jaspar, c.1940

Minister of Communications and Transport
- In office June 1936 – November 1937
- Monarch: Leopold III
- Prime Minister: Paul Van Zeeland
- Preceded by: Paul-Henri Spaak
- Succeeded by: Henri Marck

Minister of Public Health
- In office 18 April 1939 – 24 June 1940
- Monarch: Leopold III
- Prime Minister: Hubert Pierlot
- Preceded by: Willem Eekelers
- Succeeded by: Arthur Vanderpoorten

Personal details
- Born: 23 June 1901 Schaerbeek, Brussels, Belgium
- Died: 14 May 1982 (aged 80) Ixelles, Brussels, Belgium

Marcel-Henri Jaspar (Schaerbeek, 23 June 1901 – Ixelles, 14 May 1982), was a Belgian lawyer, politician, and later diplomat. He is best known for his unsuccessful attempt with Camille Huysmans and others to establish an unrecognised Belgian government in London in 1940 during World War II.

Born into an eminent Belgian family, Jaspar spent much of his youth overseas in Egypt and France. On his return to Belgium to study and practise law, he soon became involved in Liberal politics. Joining the Liberal Party, he rose rapidly through the party's youth wing and entered the Chamber of Representatives in 1929 as a deputy for Brussels. He held ministerial appointments in the coalition governments of Paul Van Zeeland and Hubert Pierlot, latterly during the German invasion of Belgium in May 1940. A convinced anti-Nazi, Jaspar's insistence that the Belgian government should continue the war from exile in the United Kingdom led him to abandon the Pierlot government when it appeared that it would seek an armistice with the Germans. Jaspar's attempt to form his own exile government in London, together with Camille Huysmans, ultimately resulted in failure but contributed to the Pierlot government's decision to establish itself in exile.

Jaspar's break with the government made a return to political life impossible. Instead, he was appointed as a diplomatic representative of the Belgian government in exile to its Czechoslovak counterpart. He continued in the diplomatic service after the war, his career culminating in the prestigious posting of Ambassador in France. Throughout his career he wrote prolifically on political and historical topics, also writing a memoir. He died in Brussels in 1982.

== Biography ==
=== Early life and political career, 1901–40 ===
Marcel-Henri Jaspar was born in Schaerbeek, a suburb of Brussels, on 23 June 1901. His father, Ernest Jaspar (1876–1940), was an eminent architect and the brother of Henri Jaspar (1870–1939) who was a Catholic politician and Prime Minister of Belgium in 1926–31. His mother, Marguerite Coopman-Dillens, came from a notable family of artists including the sculptor Julien Dillens (1849–1904). Because of the international nature of Ernest's work, Marcel-Henri spent much of his youth overseas in Cairo, Egypt (1905–15) and Paris, France (1915–19). He graduated from the University of Paris in 1918 and gained a doctorate in law at the Free University of Brussels in 1923. He practised briefly as a lawyer at the Court of Appeal in Brussels, and subsequently published a study on Belgian company law.

Jaspar became involved in liberal politics in 1921, influenced by his exposure to French liberal ideas. He became a member of the Liberal Party and was mentored by Albert Devèze, a liberal statesman. He rose through the ranks of the party's youth wing, the Jeunesses Libérales, and became head of their movement in Brussels by 1923. He quickly gained a reputation as one of leading figures in the party's "Young Turks" faction who emphasized the need for social reform besides the traditional liberal economic agenda of laissez-faire.

In May 1929, he was elected to the Chamber of Representatives as a deputy for Brussels and would remain a member until September 1944. He gained his first ministerial portfolio as Minister of Transport in the government of Paul van Zeeland (Van Zeeland II) in 1936–1937. Léon Degrelle's Rexist Party launched a number of visceral public attacks on Jaspar as a former director of the defrauded Constructa company as part of a wider denunciation of supposed "politico-financial scandals" associated with the government of Van Zeeland. In April 1939, he gained another portfolio in the Catholic-Liberal coalition of Hubert Pierlot (Pierlot II and III) as Minister of Public Health. As well as being a Francophile, Jaspar was a vocal critic of Nazism before World War II.

=== Attempted exile government, 1940 ===
Following the German invasion of Belgium (10–28 May 1940), the Belgian government was forced to withdraw from Brussels into France, eventually to Bordeaux. Despite the surrender of King Leopold III and the Belgian Army on 28 May, it continued to support the French. However, after France sought an armistice it was unclear what it would do. Jaspar advocated taking the government to London, but was this was rejected by Pierlot on 18 June. Deserting the government without permission, Jaspar arrived in London with his family on 21 June. On 23 June, he made a broadcast on the BBC to German-occupied Belgium holding himself out as the founder of a Free Belgian government. Furious, the government in Bordeaux stripped him of his ministerial title the following day.

In London, Jaspar was soon joined by other left-wing politicians, many of them radicals, such as Camille Huysmans, Max Buset, and Isabelle Blume. Inspired by the example of the French General Charles de Gaulle who had founded the Free French Movement a few days earlier, Jaspar attempted to form an alternative government on 5 July known as the "Belgian National Committee" (Comité national belge) under Huysmans's presidency. The new venture failed to secure diplomatic recognition from the British Foreign Office. The arrival of Albert De Vleeschauwer, Minister of the Colonies, in London, followed by other senior members of the Pierlot government soon afterwards, ended the attempt to establish an alternative to the Belgian government in exile.

=== Diplomatic career, 1940–68 ===
Jaspar talking to the American ambassador in Sweden (Francis White) in 1957

After his failure to establish a new government in 1940, the Pierlot government refused to allow Jaspar to return to a ministerial post. Instead, they offered him a post as chargé d'affaires (later minister plenipotentiary) to the Czechoslovak government in exile and later the re-established Czechoslovak state from 1940 to 1946. Continuing in the diplomatic service after the war, he held posts in Argentina (from 1946), Brazil (1951), and Sweden (from 1954).

Jaspar's diplomatic career culminated in 1959 when he was appointed Belgian Ambassador to France. He held the post until his retirement in 1968, a term that coincided with the presidency of Charles de Gaulle and the Algerian War.

== Personal life ==
Jaspar was married twice. In 1921, he married Marguerite Mignot, a senator's granddaughter. They had a son, Pierre, who committed suicide in Prague in 1946. In 1932, he married Betty Halpern de Becker, a White Russian émigré of Jewish origin.

During his career, Jaspar published numerous books and newspaper articles on political issues, history, and law. He wrote a biography of Pitt the Elder while in London. He published two volumes of memoirs and his personal papers are preserved at the Belgium's State Archives.

== Authography ==
- "La critique du libéralisme social", in Le Flambeau (1926)
- "La question scolaire", in Le Flambeau (1927)
- "Chronique des mauvais jours", in Le Flambeau (1928)
- "La solidarité internationale au XVIII^{e} siècle", in Le Flambeau (1933)
- Traité des sociétés anonymes (Brussels: Larcier, 1934)
- Ernest Renan et sa république (Paris: Editions Albert, 1935)
- "Le destin de la France", in France Libre (15 November 1941)
- "William Pitt et le front de l'Ouest", in France Libre (15 June 1942)
- Le Génie libéral de la France (New York: Editions Moretus, 1942)
- "William Pitt, earl of Chatham", in Message (April 1943)
- "Le ravitaillement moral", in France Libre (15 May 1943)
- "Un Tournaisien en Angleterre", in Message (November 1943)
- "Saint-Evremond à Londres", in France Libre (15 October 1945)
- William Pitt, Comte de Chatham (Brussels: Editions Lumière, 1947)
- Souvenirs sans retouche (Paris: Fayard, 1968)
- Changements de décors (Paris: Fayard, 1972)
