= Eleanor R. Davis =

American women's rights activist (1922–2020)

Eleanor Rice Davis (November 17, 1922 – November 3, 2020) was an American women's rights activist.

Davis was born in Seattle, Washington in November 1922, but settled in Portland, Oregon in 1951. By the 1960s Davis was involved in a variety of community activities, including volunteer work with the American Association of University Women, the Unitarian Universalist Women's Federation, the Oregon Council for Women's Equality, and the Oregon Women's Political Caucus.

By 1971, Davis became an investigator for the Civil Rights Division of the Oregon Bureau of Labor, as well as working on the Task Force on Sex Discrimination in Education and the Governor's Commission on the Status of Women.

Davis died on November 3, 2020, at the age of 97.
