= Dostana =

Dostana (lit. 'friendship' in Hindi-Urdu) may refer to:

- Dostana (1980 film), an Indian film by Raj Khosla
- Dostana (2008 film), an Indian film by Tarun Mansukhani
  - Dostana (soundtrack), its soundtrack by Vishal–Shekhar
  - Dostana 2, its unrealized sequel

== See also ==
- Dost (disambiguation)
- Dosti (disambiguation)
