= Sha'ar Hashamayim Synagogue (Cairo) =

Synagogue in Cairo, Egypt

Sha'ar HaShamayim Synagogue
- Hebrew: בית כנסת שער השמים; Arabic: كنيس عدلي
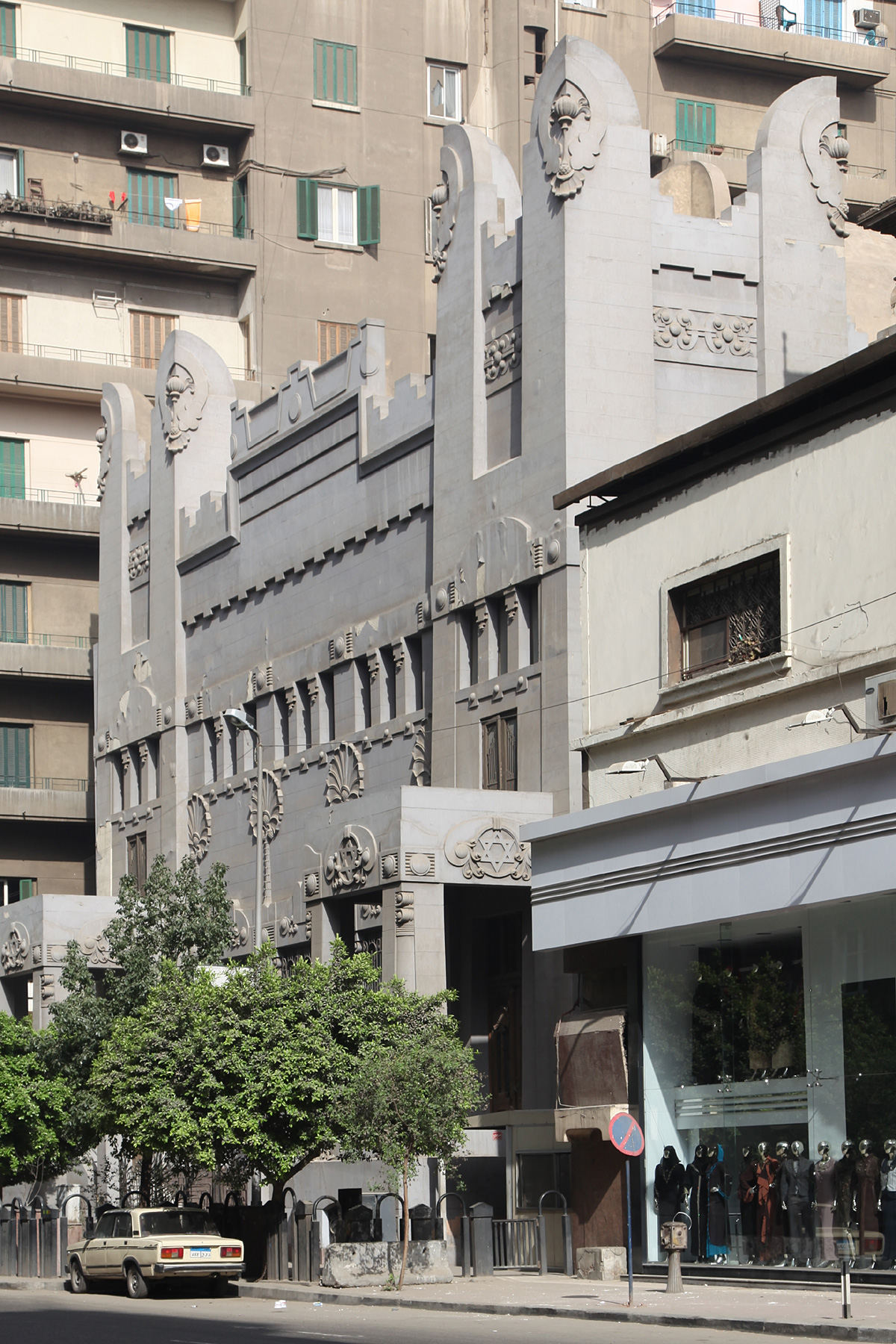
- The façade of the synagogue in 2013

- Location of the synagogue, relative to the Nile Delta

Religion
- Affiliation: Judaism
- Rite: Nusach Sefard
- Ecclesiastical or organizational status: Synagogue
- Status: Active

Location
- Location: 17 Adly Street, Cairo
- Country: Egypt
- Interactive map of Sha'ar HaShamayim Synagogue
- Coordinates: 30°03′05″N 31°14′37″E

Architecture
- Architects: Maurice Youssef Cattaui; Eduard Matasek
- Type: Synagogue architecture
- Style: Ottoman; Art Deco
- Groundbreaking: 1899
- Completed: 1908

The Sha'ar HaShamayim Synagogue (Hebrew: בית כנסת שער השמים, lit. 'Gate of Heaven'; Arabic: كنيس عدلي), also known as Temple Ismailia and the Adly Street Synagogue, is a synagogue, located at 17 Adly Street in Cairo, Egypt.

== History ==
Its long-time leader was Chief Rabbi Chaim Nahum. In 2008, the synagogue marked its 100th anniversary. The synagogue was built in a style evoking ancient Egyptian temples, and was once the largest building on the boulevard.

Work commenced on the synagogue in 1899 and it was inaugurated in 1908, at a time when there was a vibrant Jewish community in Cairo. The last time the synagogue was full was in the 1960s. Today the community numbers approximately six members, most of them older women.

The building houses a collection of a few hundred books, ranging in age from the 1500s to contemporary times, concerning or relevant to the history of Jews in Egypt.

Although it is considered a Sephardic synagogue, many Ashkenazi Jews were members of the congregation and contributed to its construction and upkeep.

The synagogue underwent minor exterior renovations in 2007.

=== 2010 arson incident ===
In February 2010, a booby-trapped suitcase was hurled at the synagogue from a nearby hotel. The suitcase caught fire, but no one was hurt and no damage was reported.

== Gallery ==
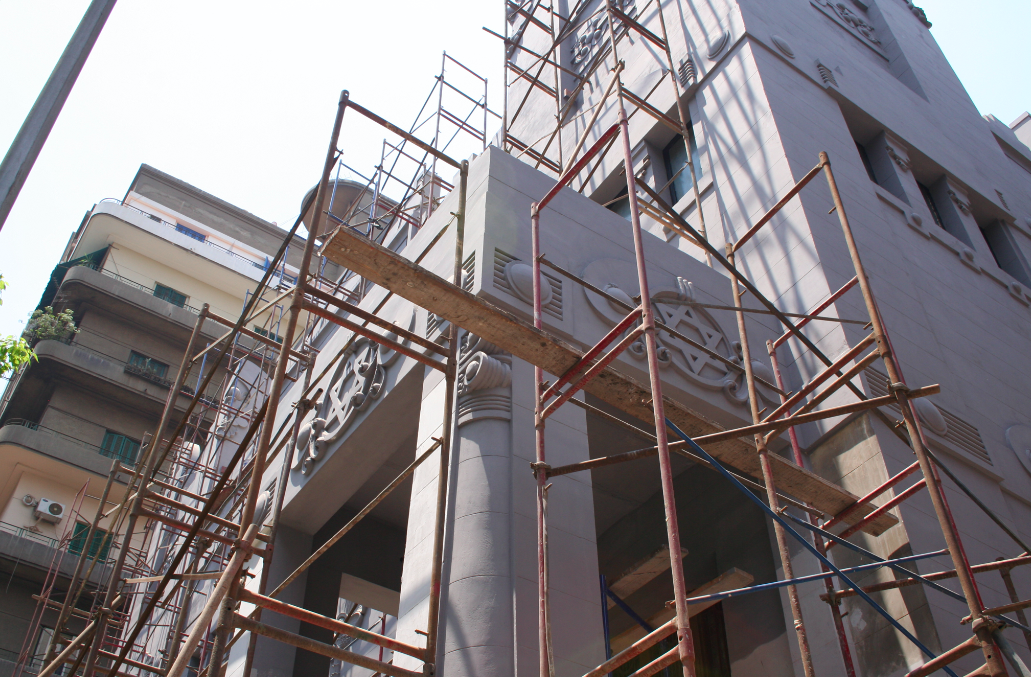
Renovations (2007)

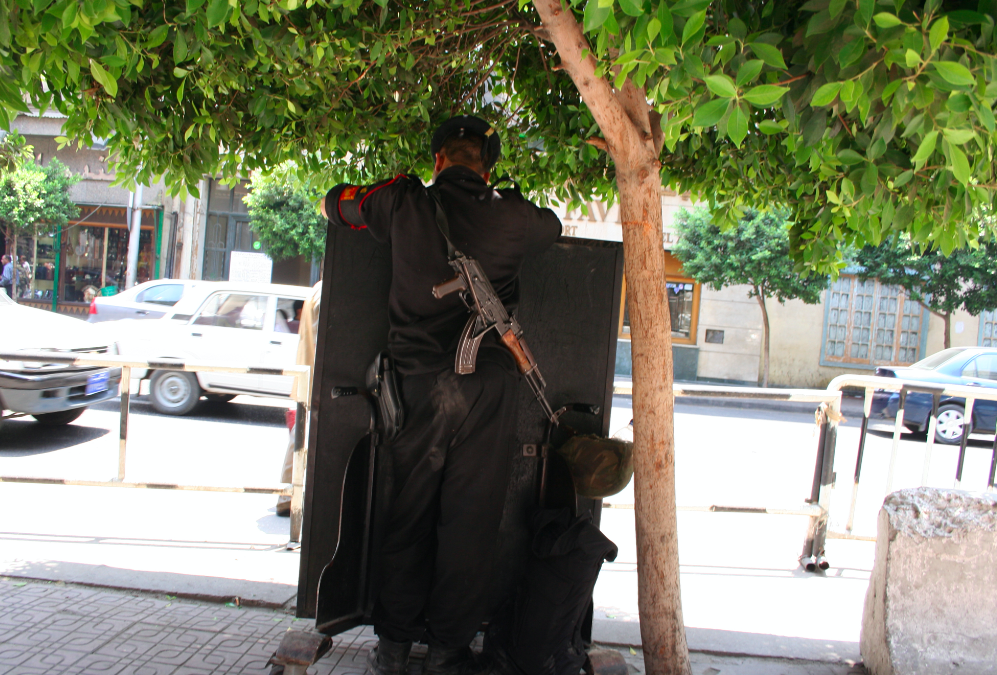
Exterior guard (Cairo police)

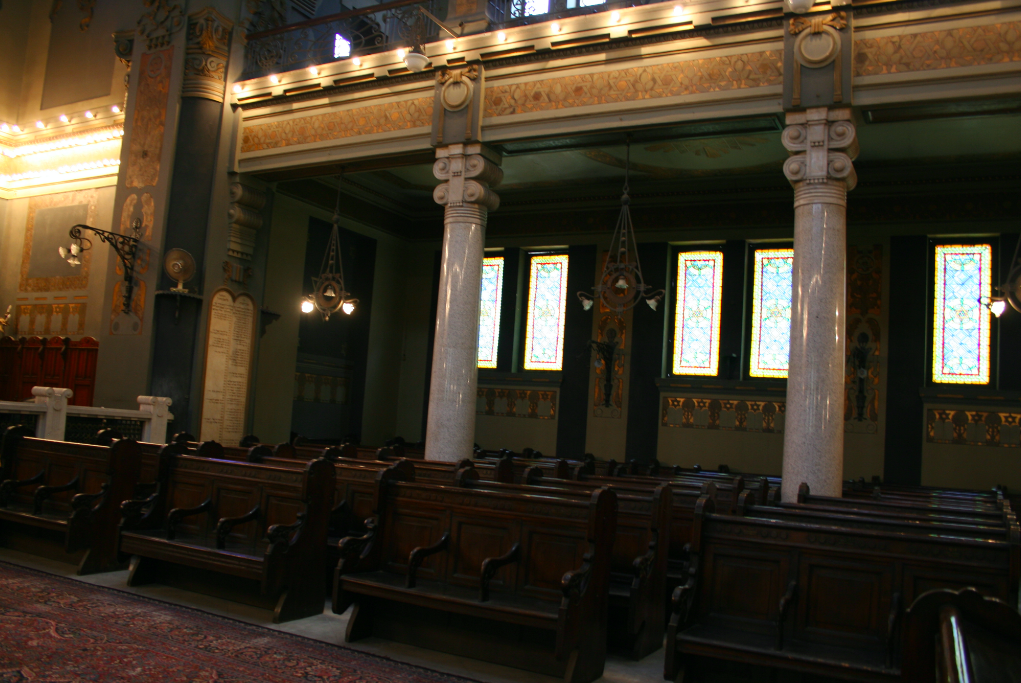
Synagogue pews

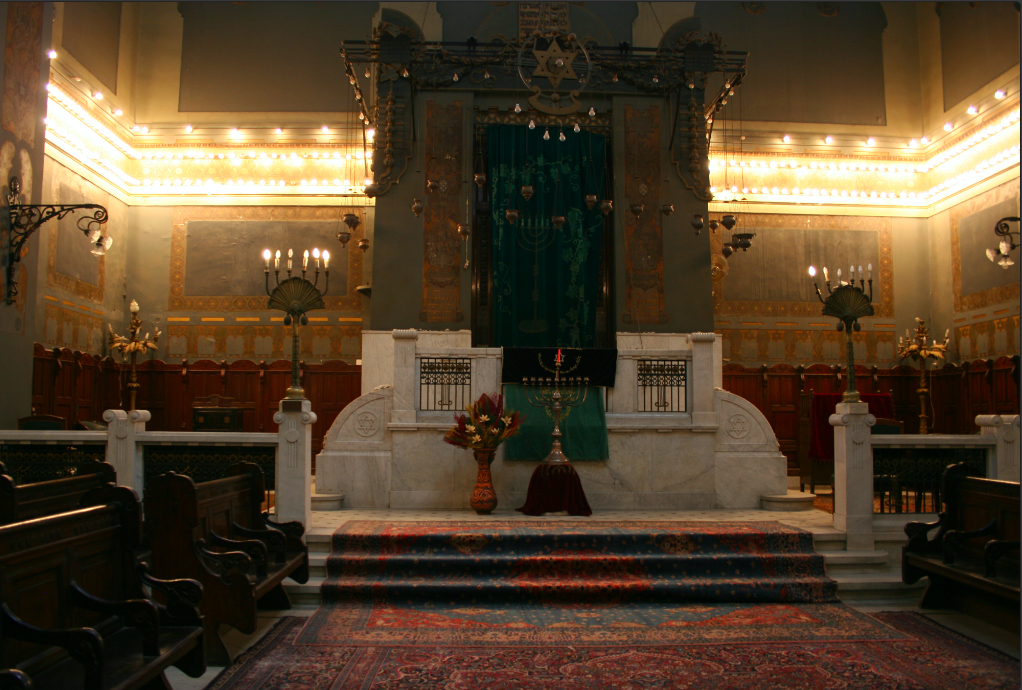
Synagogue bimah

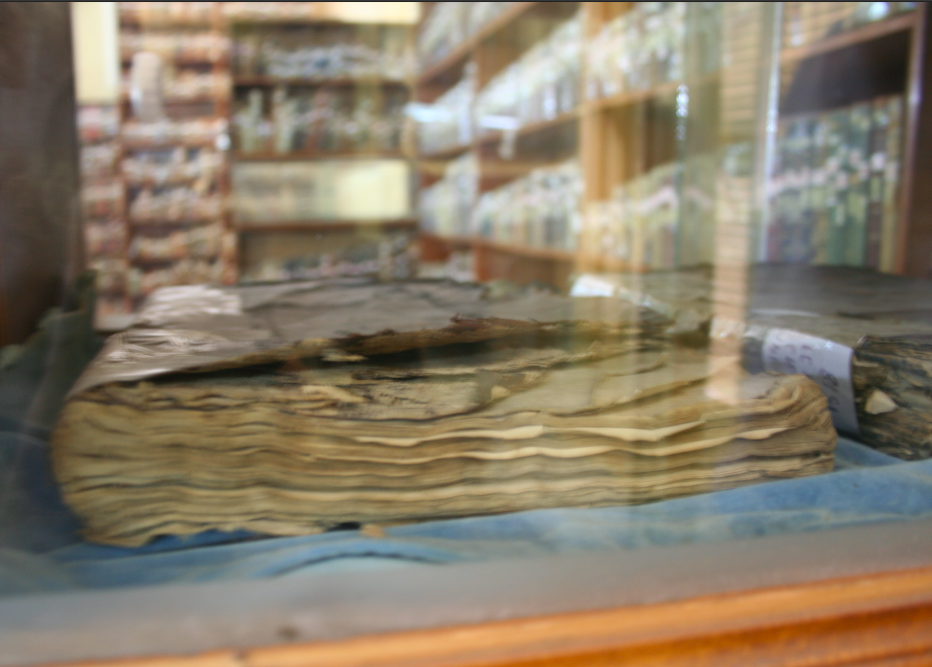
Older text from 1500s

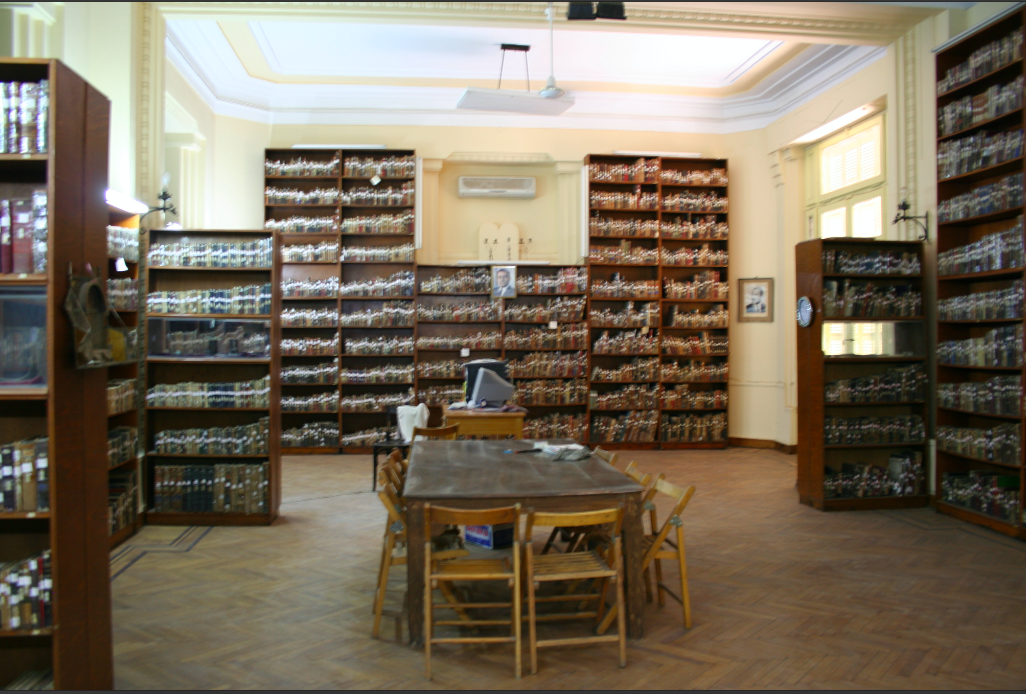
Collections in the Library

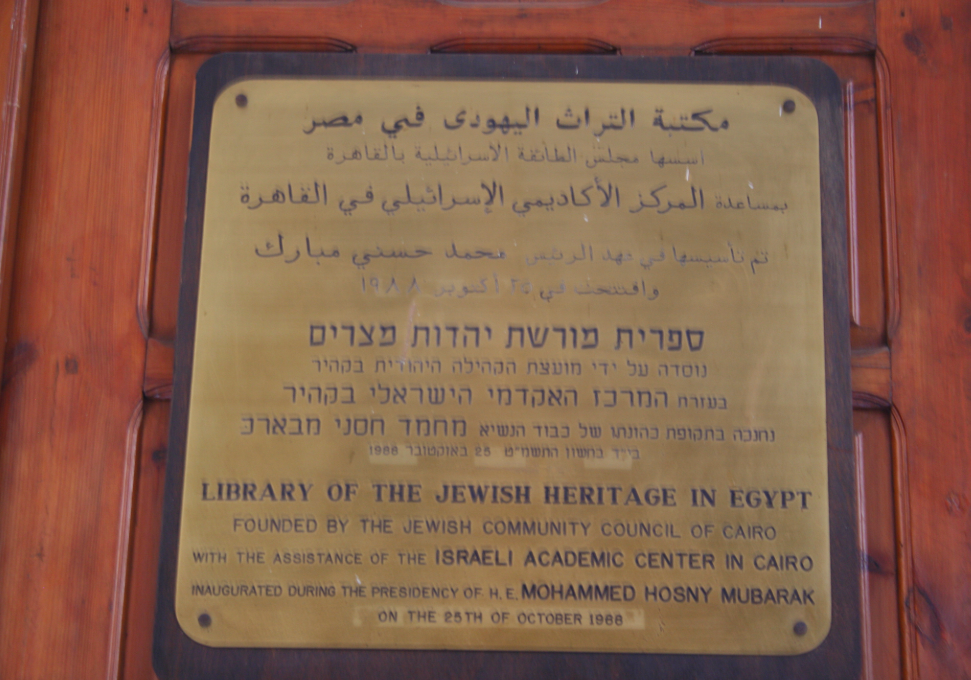
Commemorative Plaque

== See also ==
- History of the Jews in Egypt
- Synagogues in Cairo
- List of synagogues in Egypt
