= Oregon Women's Political Caucus =

Political group focused on Oregon women

The Oregon Women's Political Caucus was founded in 1971 as a bipartisan group to advocate for increased involvement of women in Oregon politics. Founded by a variety of Oregon women already active in politics, including Gretchen Kafoury, Margie Hendriksen, and Jeanne Dost, the OWPC was officially incorporated on June 26, 1972. Its first State Convention was held in Salem on September 30, 1972, to adopt by-laws and elect co-coordinators. Members and honorees have included important Oregon political figures such as Betty Roberts, Governor Barbara Roberts, and Eleanor R. Davis.

Eventually focusing on the election of pro-choice candidates, whether male or female, to state and local political positions, one project of the OWPC was the creation of the Oregon Women's Campaign School.
