= Dost (1989 film) =

- Directed by: K. Murali Mohana Rao
- Written by: Kader Khan (dialogue)
- Screenplay by: M. D. Sunder
- Produced by: A. Suryanarayana; Bhanodaya Productions
- Starring: Mithun Chakraborty; Amala
- Cinematography: V. S. R. Swamy
- Edited by: J. Narasimha Rao
- Music by: R. D. Burman
- Release date: 4 August 1989
- Running time: 160 minutes
- Country: India
- Language: Hindi

For other films, see Dost

Dost (transl. Friend) is a 1989 Hindi film directed by K. Murali Mohana Rao and produced by A. Suryanarayana under Bhanodaya Productions banner. Mithun Chakraborty, Amala played the lead pair of this family drama. The lyrics were written by Indeevar with music composed by R. D. Burman.

== Plot ==
Sher Singh (Amjad Khan) and his son Nagender (Kiran Kumar) are involved in poaching, cutting trees and smuggle them out of the Jungle. They murder forest officer Anthony (Dalip Tahil) and Raja (Mithun Chakravarty) takes charge in his place. Elephant Ram, Monkey Bansi & Parrot Mithu are Raja's friends in the Jungle. They help each other in the time of distress. Once Raja rescues Ram from the clutches of a crocodile. Raja warns Sher Singh and Nagender to stop the smuggling, resulting in enmity between them. Sher Singh wants to marry his unworthy son Nagender with Pooja (Amala), the daughter of a millionaire Brijmohan (Sujit Kumar). Bharti (Shobha Khote), Sher Singh's wife, on the other hand wants that Pooja be married to her innocent nephew Buddhi Ram Aval Chand Dimagwala (Kader Khan), as she is the daughter of the friend of Buddhi's deceased father. But Pooja wants to marry Raja as he saved her from the clutches of the Nagender's lusty eyes when she went out for hunting. Pooja marries Raja against her father's wishes. Raja's well wisher and tribal leader Mangola (Sharad Saxena) performs the rites on behalf of Pooja's father. To avenge this, Nagender attempts to molest Pooja and beat Raja. Ram and Bansi come in and avert this attempt. Raja catches Sher Singh and Nagender red-handed while sending the smuggled articles out of the Jungle. Judge awards them six years rigorous imprisonment. After release from the jail, Sher Singh & Nagender find Raja and Pooja have a son Ravi (Antriksh), and trouble them a lot. The extent of Nagender's meanness crosses the boundaries with the intoxication of Ram. Ram goes berserk, destroys property, attacks Raja's family, grievously injuring Ravi. Pooja mistakes Ram, quarrels with her husband, leaves the house in sheer anger with Ravi & reaches her father's place. One day, Raja's servant Sukhiya (Asrani) comes to Brijmohan's house to convey Ram's message to Ravi. The content of Ram's message to Ravi, clearance of misunderstanding between Raja and Pooja, the fate of Sher Singh and Nagender, and Buddhi Ram's role in this, forms the rest of the story.

== Cast ==
- Mithun Chakraborty as Forest Officer Raja
- Amala as Pooja
- Kiran Kumar as Naagendra Singh
- Sujit Kumar as Brijmohan
- Kader Khan as Buddhiram
- Amjad Khan as Sher Singh
- Shubha Khote as Bharti Singh
- Asrani as Sukhiya
- Annu Kapoor as Forest Officer Balwant Khanna
- Vikas Anand as Mohan, Raja's boss
- Anil Dhawan as Forest Officer Anthony
- Bandini Mishra as Gilli
- Sharat Saxena as Mangola
- Bob Christo as Jackson
- Master Antriksh as Ravi (Raja & Pooja's Son)

== Crew ==
- Director – K. Murali Mohan Rao
- Screenplay – M. D. Sunder
- Dialogue – Kader Khan
- Producer – A. Suryanarayana
- Production Company – Bhanodaya Productions
- Editor – J. Narasimha Rao
- Cinematographer – V. S. R. Swamy
- Music Director – Rahul Dev Burman
- Lyricist – Indeevar
- Playback Singers – Amit Kumar, Asha Bhosle, Alka Yagnik

== Soundtrack ==
Music of this film is by R. D. Burman with lyrics by Indeevar.

Song	Singer
"Hirni Jaisi"	Amit Kumar
"Tu Hi Heera"	Amit Kumar, Asha Bhosle
"Step By Step"	Amit Kumar, Asha Bhosle
"Dil To Chahe Yeh"	Amit Kumar, Asha Bhosle
"Chhota Sa Parivar"	Amit Kumar, Asha Bhosle
"Haathi Raja"	Alka Yagnik
