= Dost (surname) =

Dost is a surname. Notable people with the surname include:

- Abdul Rahim Muslim Dost (born 1960), Afghan journalist and jeweller
- Andrew Dost (born 1983), American musician
- Bas Dost (born 1989), Dutch football player
- Bernd Dost (1939–2015), German journalist, filmmaker, writer and publisher
- Erol Dost (born 1999), Bulgarian football player
- Jan Dost (born 1965), Syrian Kurdish poet
- Jeanne Dost, American economist
- Kader Dost (born 2000), Turkish race walker
- Marcel Dost (born 1969), Dutch decathlete
- Sultan Mohammad Dost (born 1932), Afghan wrestler
