= Osmania University =

Public university in Hyderabad, Telangana, India

- Motto in English: Lead us from Darkness to Light
- Type: Public
- Established: 1918; 108 years ago
- Founder: Mir Osman Ali Khan
- Accreditation: NAAC; NBA
- Academic affiliations: UGC; AIU; AICTE; BCI
- Chancellor: Governor of Telangana
- Vice-Chancellor: Kumar Molugaram
- Academic staff: 445
- Students: 10,280
- Undergraduates: 1,989
- Postgraduates: 5,091
- Doctoral students: 3,200
- Location: Osmania University Main road, Amberpet, Hyderabad, Telangana, India; 17.411°N 78.529°E
- Campus: 1,600 acres (650 ha); Urban
- Website: www.osmania.ac.in
- Location in Osmania University

Osmania University is a collegiate public state university located in Hyderabad, Telangana, India. Mir Osman Ali Khan, the 7th Nizam of Hyderabad, issued a firman calling for its creation on 29 August 1917. It is the third oldest university in southern India, and the first to be established in the erstwhile Kingdom of Hyderabad.

Osmania University was the first Indian university to use Urdu as a language of instruction, although with English as a compulsory subject. As of 2012, the university hosts 3,700 international students from more than 80 nations. It is also one of the largest university systems in the world with over 300,000 students on its campuses and affiliated colleges.

Osmania University is a non-profit university which is funded and managed by the Government of Telangana. Admissions into the Bachelors, Masters and Doctoral programs in main campus is on a merit basis, evaluated by national entrance examinations such as TG-EAPCET, TG-CPGET, TG-LAWCET, TG-PGLCET, GATE, Osmania PhD Entrance Exam, DOST, and Osmania University Common Entrance Test for each of the courses offered.

The university is accredited by the NAAC with an 'A^{+}' Grade and conferred with the status of 'University with Potential for Excellence' by the UGC, New Delhi.

== History ==
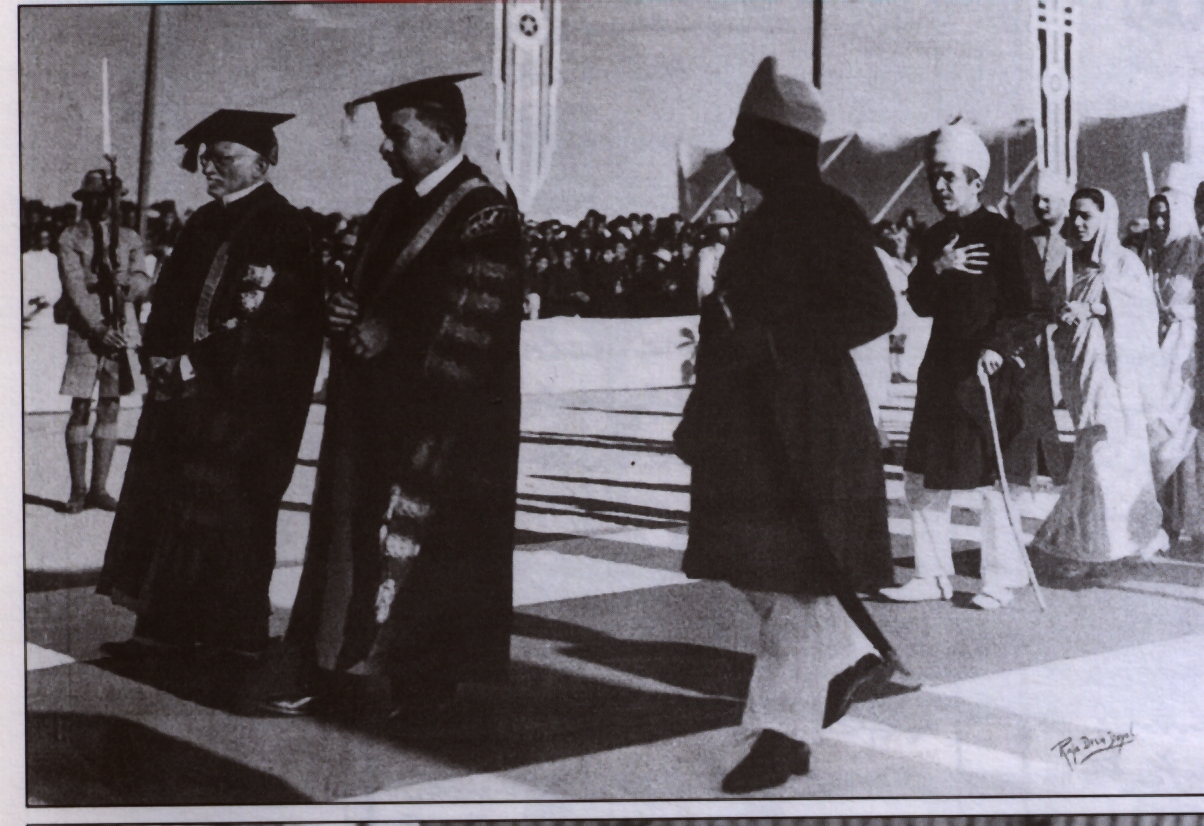
Inauguration of "Osmania University Arts College" by the Nizam Mir Osman Ali Khan, c. 1937.

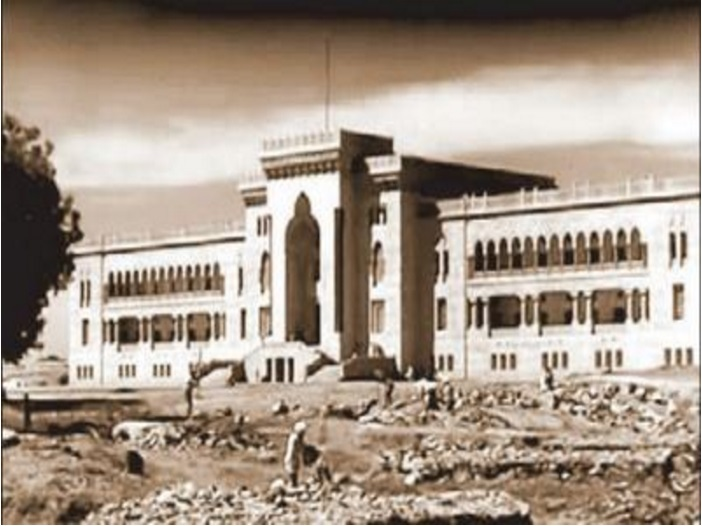
Osmania Arts college in 1930s

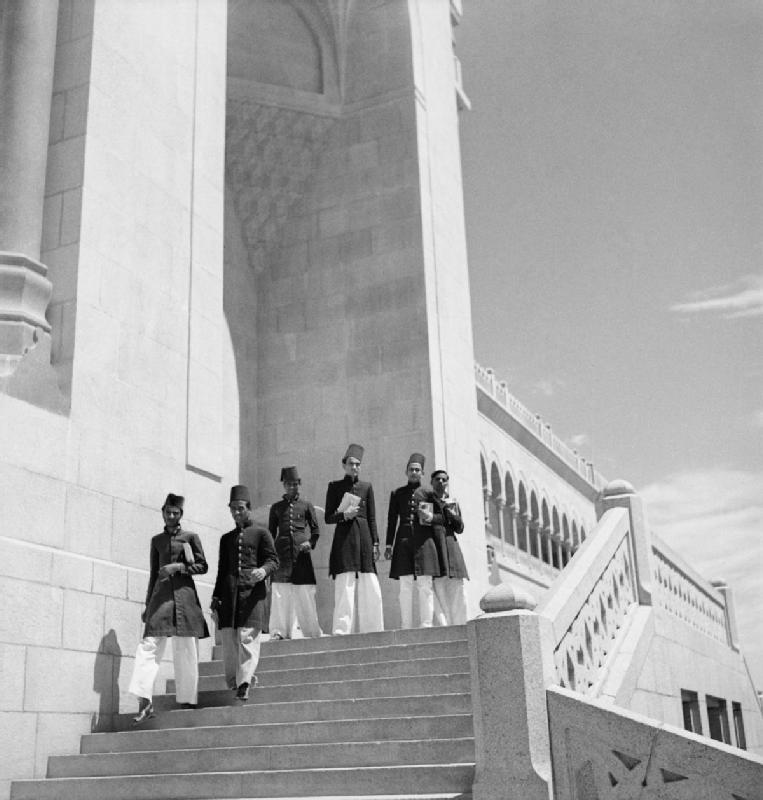
Students dressed in sherwani at the University College of Arts, c. 1939–1945.

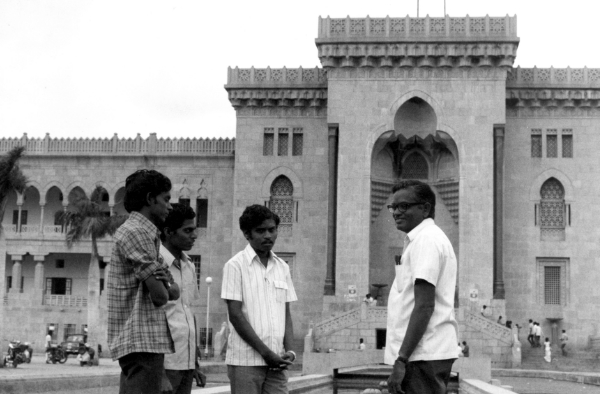
B. E. Vijayam addresses students with the arts college (Old Main) in the background, c. 1973.

In 1917, Sir Akbar Hydari, in a memorandum to the Education Minister, emphasised the need to establish a university in Hyderabad with Urdu as the medium of instruction, "as it is the language of the widest currency in the state". On 26 April 1917, the Nizam of Hyderabad Mir Osman Ali Khan issued a firman to establish the Osmania University.

The university began functioning in 1918 in a building adjacent to the Nizam College at Basheerbagh. Arts and theology were the only two faculties offered, and the first batch consisted of 225 students and 25 faculty members.

The government invited the Scottish urban planner Patrick Geddes and the Belgian architect Ernest Jaspar to establish a permanent campus. Geddes surveyed prospective locations and presented his report in 1923. Jasper drew up the building plans and the Nizam laid the foundation stone for the campus on 5 July 1934. After Jasper left Hyderabad, the state architect Zain Yar Jung supervised the construction of the campus.

=== Post-Independence (1947-present) ===
After independence and the accession of Hyderabad State in 1948, the university fell under the purview of the state government. After the election of the first state government, the central government announced plans to convert Osmania University into a central university with Hindi as the medium of instructions. However, this led to protests and with pressure from the Mulki agitation, the plan was dropped. Eventually, English replaced Urdu as the medium of instruction, and the Nizam's crown was also removed from the university seal.

== Seal ==
The original seal featured the Nizam's crown as the crest, along with the phrase Noorun Ala Noor. It also contained the hadith, "I am the city of knowledge and Ali is its gate". The present emblem contains inscriptions in Telugu and Sanskrit. The new logo has the Urdu letter Ain in between.

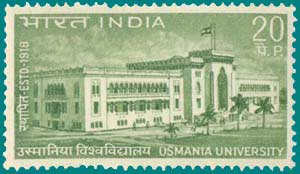
The university postage stamp released by the government of India on 15 March 1969

== Main Campus ==
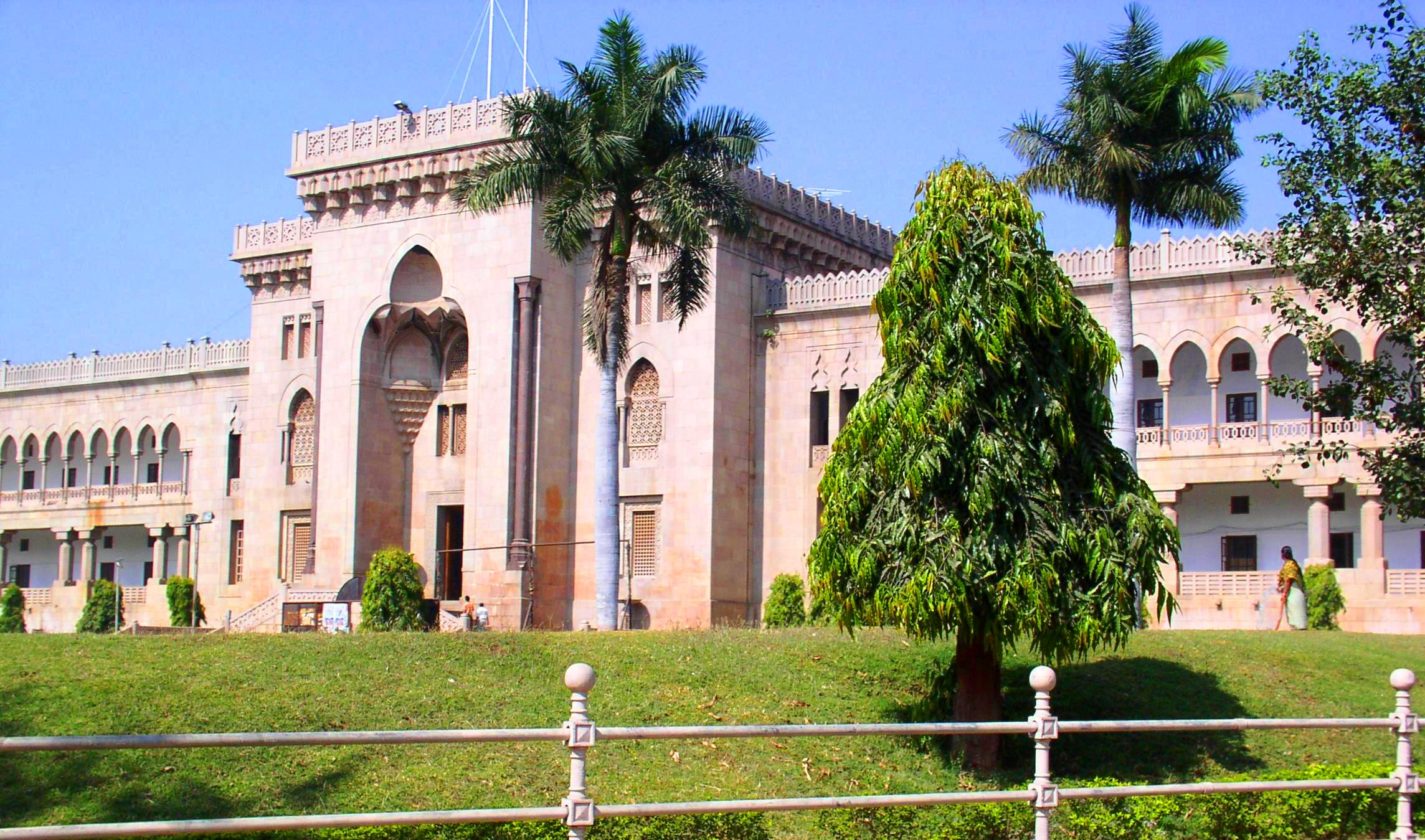
The University College of Arts and Social Sciences has an architectural heritage structure similar to College of Sultan Hassan in Cairo, Egypt.

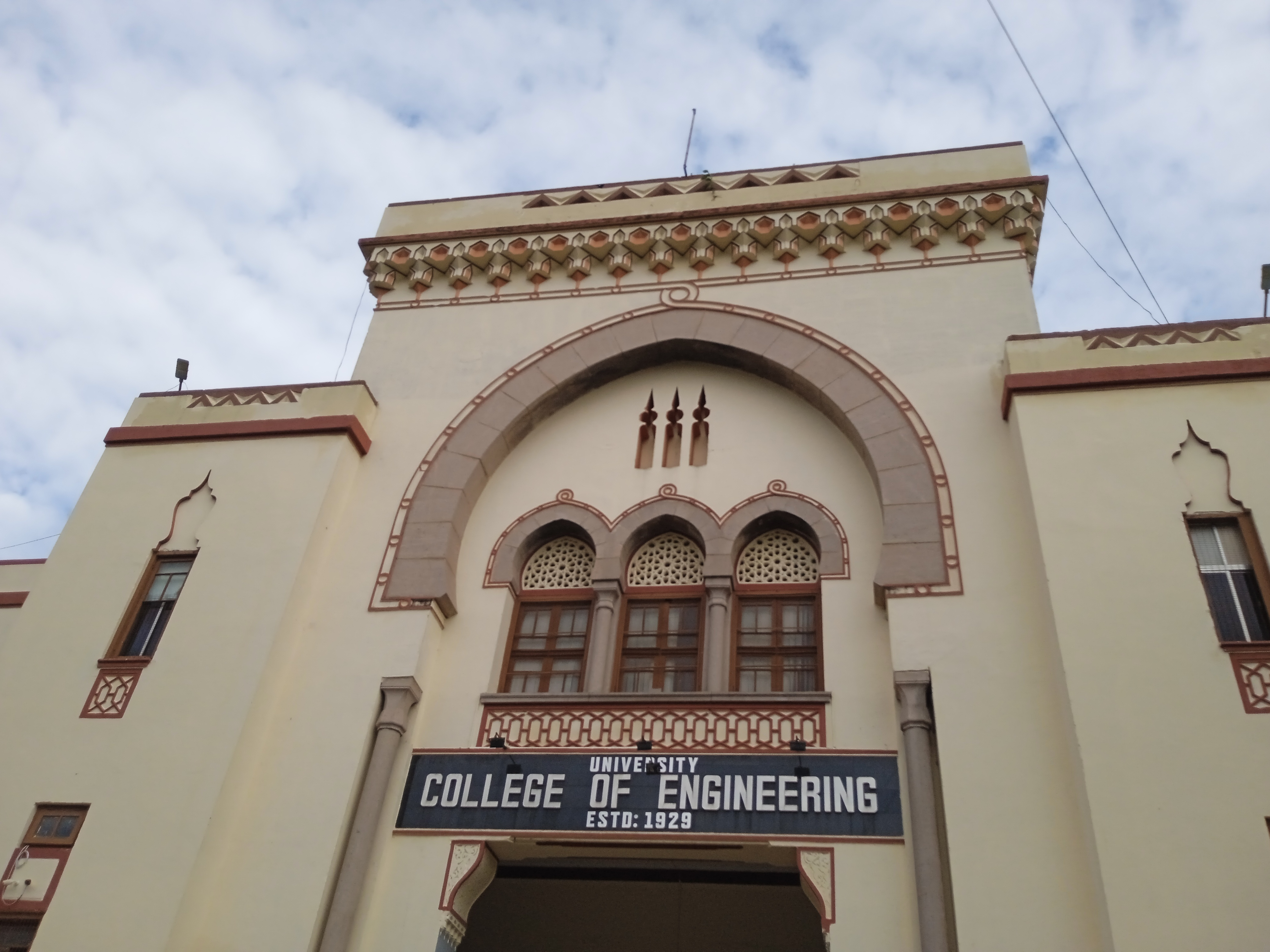
The College of Engineering was one of the top 15 engineering schools in the country in 2012

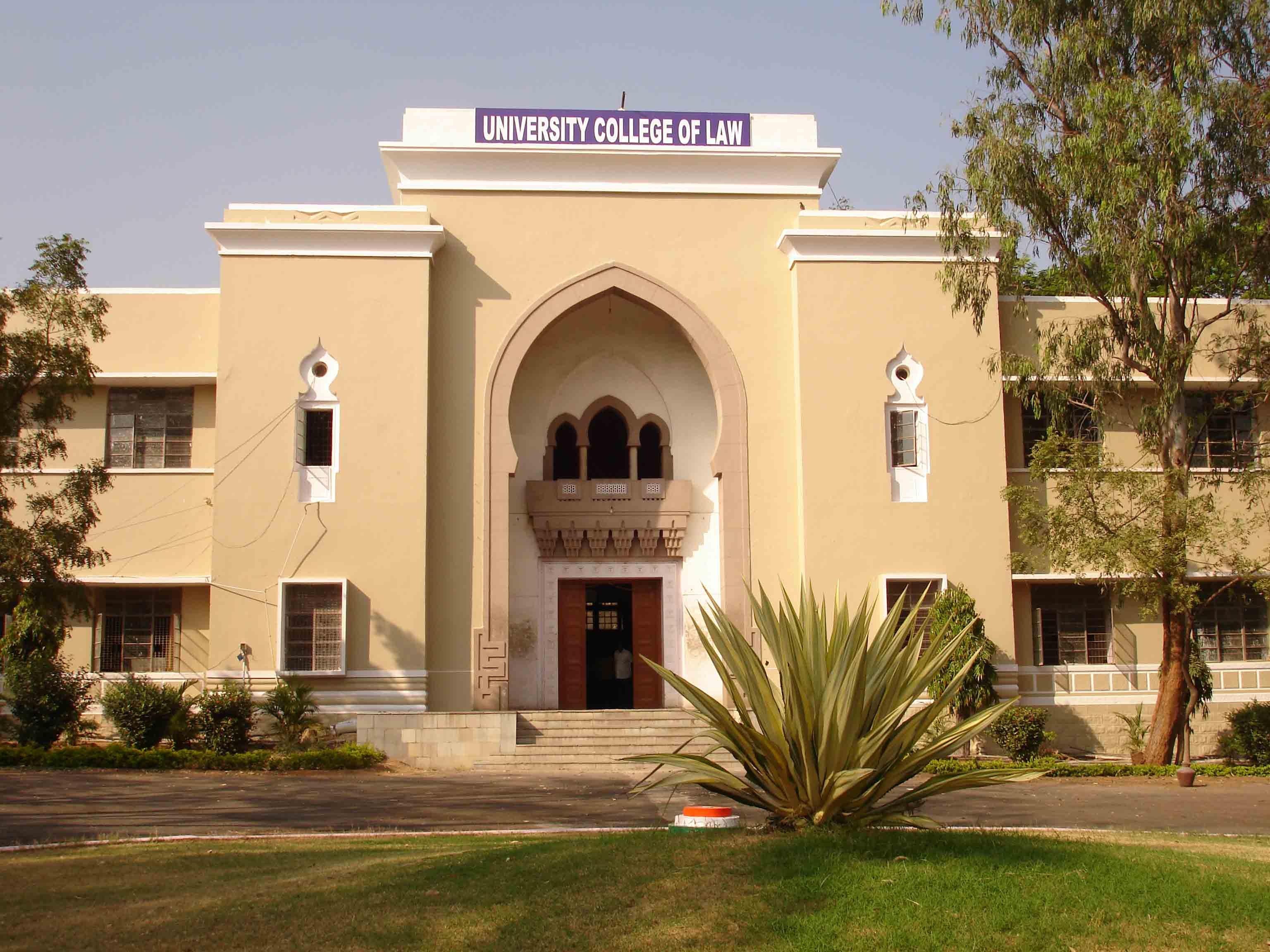
The College of Law is one of the top 15 law schools in the country

The University Library

The University College of Arts and Social Sciences, University College of Commerce & Business Management, University College of Technology, University College of Engineering, University College of Law, University College of Science, Institute of Advance Study in Education, and PG College of Physical Education. The university offers courses in Humanities, Arts, Sciences, Social Sciences, Law, Engineering, Medicine, Technology, Commerce and Business Management, Information Technology and Oriental Languages. In 2001, Osmania was awarded five-star status by the National Accreditation and Assessment Council (NAAC) of the University Grants Commission, part of the Government of India.

The university has a campus of nearly 1600 acres (6 km^{2}) with 300,000 students (counting all the campuses, constituent affiliated colleges and district centres) making it one of the largest higher education systems in India. Nearly 5000 faculty and staff are employed at Osmania. It attracts students from across the nation as well as from other countries. The Osmania Medical College was once a part of the Osmania University System. However, it is now under the supervision of Kaloji Narayana Rao University of Health Sciences.

The University Library is the main library of the university and it was founded in 1918 along with the university. It has close to 500,000 books and more than 6000 manuscripts, which includes rare palm leave manuscripts. It also has various journals, government documents, etc. The main library coordinates a library system, which connects the libraries in the entire campus and other constituent college libraries.

== Rankings ==
University and Institute rankings

General – international
- ARWU (2024): Not available
- QS (World) (2025): 1201–1400
- QS (Asia) (2024): Not available
- Times (World) (2024): 1001–1200
- Times (Asia) (2024): Not available
- Times (Emerging) (2022): 251+

General – India
- NIRF (Overall) (2024): 53
- NIRF (Research) (2024): Not available
- NIRF (Universities) (2024): 30

Osmania University is ranked in the 1201–1400 band globally in the QS World University Rankings 2026. The university is also placed in the 1201–1500 band worldwide in the Times Higher Education World University Rankings 2026.

In India, Osmania University was ranked 30th among universities and 53rd overall in the National Institutional Ranking Framework (NIRF) 2025.

== Research ==
The research activities are funded by various autonomous agencies of the government of India. Foreign students are also admitted to the university via UFRO (University Foreign Relations Office) that allots admissions with minimum criteria. Indian students living overseas Non-resident Indian are also admitted through UFRO that are usually ineligible to get admissions via the entrance exams quota.

== Notable alumni and faculty ==
Notable alumni of Osmania University include 9th Prime Minister of India P. V. Narasimha Rao, Jaipal Reddy, cabinet minister, 16th and last Chief Minister of united Andhra Pradesh with Telangana Nallari Kiran Kumar Reddy, CEO Adobe systems Shantanu Narayen and senior advocate Subodh Markandeya.

Other alumni include spiritual guide and founder of Shrimad Rajchandra Mission Dharampur, Pujya Gurudevshri Rakeshji, pro chancellor of Khaja Bandanawaz University Syed Muhammad Ali Al Hussaini, former Ambassador of India to Saudi Arabia and Yemen Dr Ausaf Sayeed, former Indian Cricket team captain Mohammed Azharuddin, cricket commentator Harsha Bhogle, novelist Venkatesh Kulkarni, author and poet Sneha Narayanan, PDSU founder George Reddy, former Union Home Minister Shivraj Patil, former governor of the Reserve Bank of India Yaga Venugopal Reddy, chemist Garikapati Narahari Sastry, Metallurgist and former Vice Chancellor of Banaras Hindu University Patcha Ramachandra Rao and physicist Raziuddin Siddiqui. Rakesh Sharma, cosmonaut and the first Indian to travel in space, was a graduate of Osmania.

Karan Bilimoria, founder of Cobra Beer, Member of the House of Lords, and the seventh Chancellor of the University of Birmingham earned his Bachelor of Commerce degree from Osmania in 1981. Rafi Ahmed, a well-known virologist and immunologist graduated from Osmania University in 1968. Krishna R. Reddy, civil and environmental engineer known for his research in geotechnical and geoenvironmental engineering, graduated from Osmania University in 1983 with a gold medal.

Notable former faculty members of the university include Bhadriraju Krishnamurti, Dravidianist and linguist, and founder of linguistics department at the university, physicist Suri Bhagavantam, and linguist Masud Husain Khan.

== Organization and administration ==
=== Off-Campus Constituent colleges ===
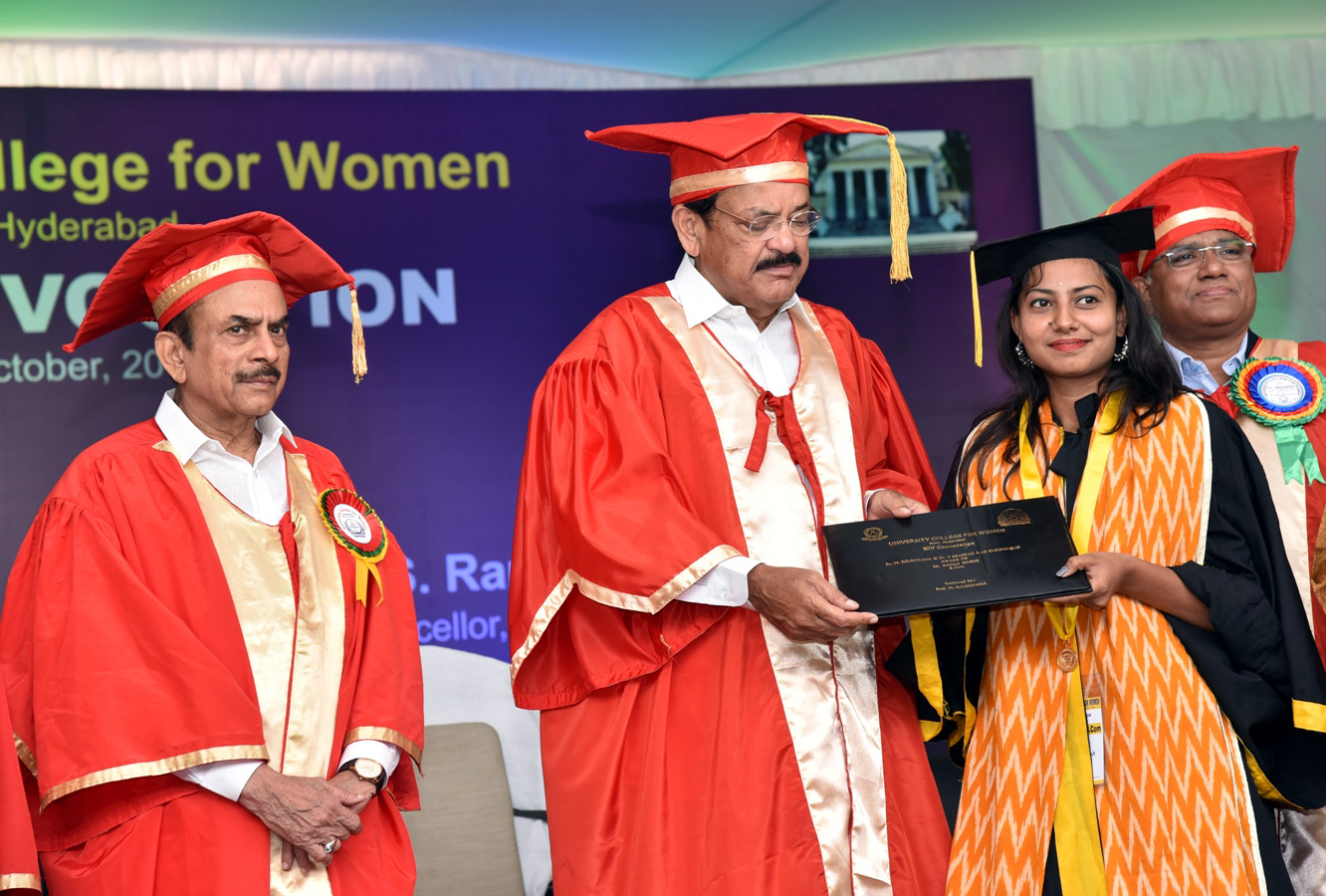
M. Venkaiah Naidu, Vice President of India presenting gold medals to the University College for Women graduates at the XIV Convocation

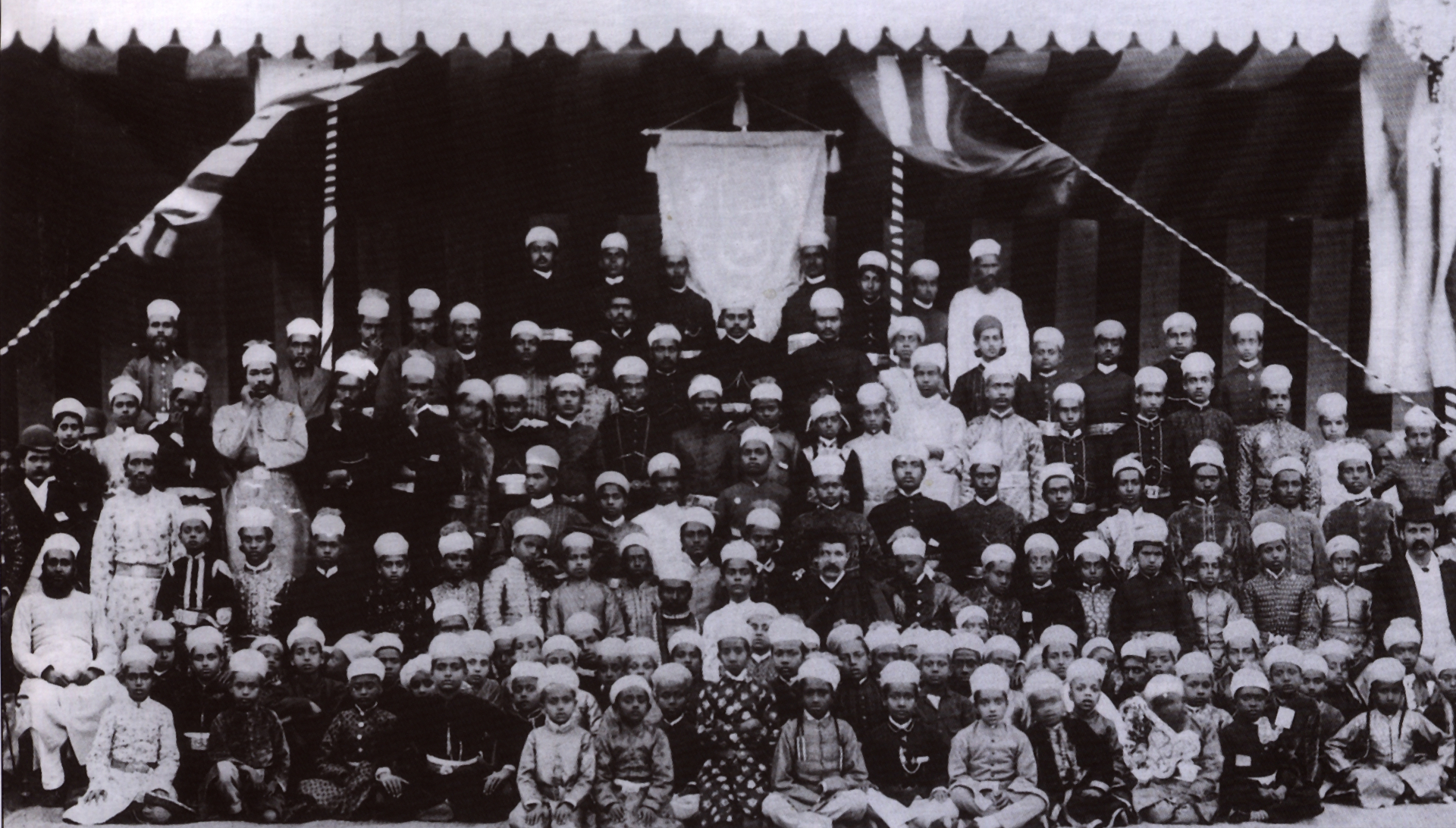
Students and staff of Nizam college c. 1890

Osmania University is a confederation of university colleges, constituent colleges, and affiliated community colleges. The constituent colleges of the university include:

- University College for Women, Koti
- Nizam College, Basheerbhagh
- University Post Graduate College, Secunderabad
- Post Graduate College of Law, Basheerbhagh

=== Autonomous state and central Institutes ===
- Government City College, Hyderabad
- Institution of Electronics and Telecommunication Engineers, Hyderabad
- Indian Council of Social Science Research, Hyderabad
- National Institute of Nutrition, Hyderabad
- Institute of Genetics and Hospital for Genetic Diseases, Hyderabad
- Centre For Plant Molecular Biology
- Centre For Indian Ocean Studies
- Japal-Rangapur Observatory
- Research and Training Unit in Navigational Electronics
- Regional Centre For Urban and Environmental Studies
- Centre For Stem Cell Science, Hyderabad
- PGRR center for distance education

=== Affiliated Private Engineering Colleges ===
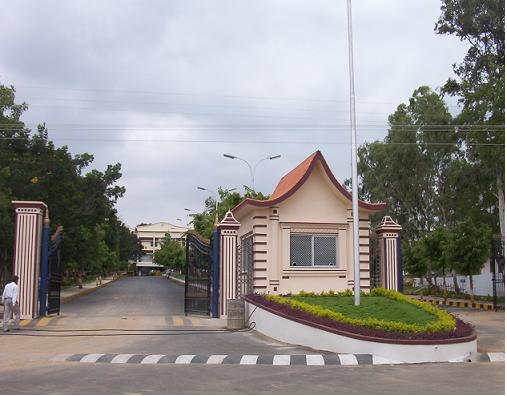
Chaitanya Bharathi Institute of Technology is affiliated to the Osmania University

The affiliated engineering colleges of the university are mostly scattered throughout the GHMC area and offer various undergraduate and post-graduate engineering courses. The affiliated engineering colleges include (in no particular order):

- Chaitanya Bharathi Institute of Technology
- Vasavi College of Engineering
- Muffakham Jah College of Engineering and Technology
- Deccan College of Engineering and Technology
- Maturi Venkata Subba Rao Engineering College
- Matrusri Engineering College
- Methodist College of Engineering and Technology
- Stanley College of Engineering and Technology for Women
- Islamia Engineering College
- Neil Gogte Institute of Technology
- Keshav Memorial Engineering College
- Gokaraju Lailavati Engineering College for Women
