= Dosti =

Dosti may refer to:

== Arts and entertainment ==
- Dosti (1964 film), an Indian black-and-white Hindi-language drama film
- Dosti (1971 film), a Pakistani Urdu film
- Dosti: Friends Forever, a 2005 Indian Hindi romantic-drama buddy film starring Akshay Kumar and Kareena Kapoor
- Dosti (2014 film), an Indian Kannada-language film
- Dosti (album), an album by Junoon
- "Dosti", a song by Nazia and Zoheb from the 1983 album Young Tarang

== People ==
- Albi Dosti (born 1991), Albanian footballer
- Edmond Dosti (born 1969), Albanian footballer
- Hasan Dosti (1895–1991), Albanian jurist and politician
- Victor Dosti, Albanian political prisoner and human rights activist

== See also ==
- Dost (disambiguation)
- Dostana (disambiguation)
- Dəstə, a village in the Ordubad Rayon of Nakhchivan, Azerbaijan
