= Collège du Sacré-Cœur (Egypt) =

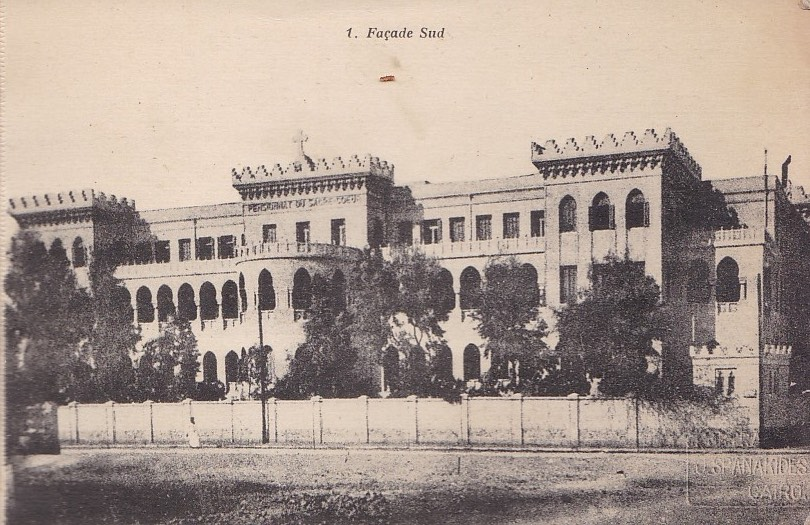
- South façade of College du Sacre Coeur Heliopolis in 1929

Location
- Cairo, Heliopolis; Egypt; 30.0699°N 31.2676°E

Information
- Religious affiliation: Catholic church
- Established: 1 March 1904
- Founder: 7 Sisters (1904) Ismail Sidky (1911); 4 Mothers 1 Sister
- Years offered: 14 years
- Affiliation: School of the Sacred Heart

Collège du Sacré-Cœur is a Roman Catholic French-language school located in Cairo, Egypt. The school hosts two campuses the original one in Ghamra founded in 1904 and a second campus founded in 1911 on Beirut street at Heliopolis. Despite being labelled a collège, the school covers all years from nursey through secondary and is a member of The Network of Sacred Heart Schools.

== History ==
The Collège was founded in 1904 under the name Pensionnat du Sacré-Cœur (Sacred Heart boarding school). A second school was added at the urging of Ismail Sidky as a way to provide French-language instruction to the newly constructed city of Heliopolis in 1911. The school's building was built in 1900's with the distinct Heliopolis style modeled after the orientalist designs of Ernest Jaspar. The school's early classes had a small number of girls most of whom were European but over time grew rapidly and would come to primarily consist of Egyptian citizens.

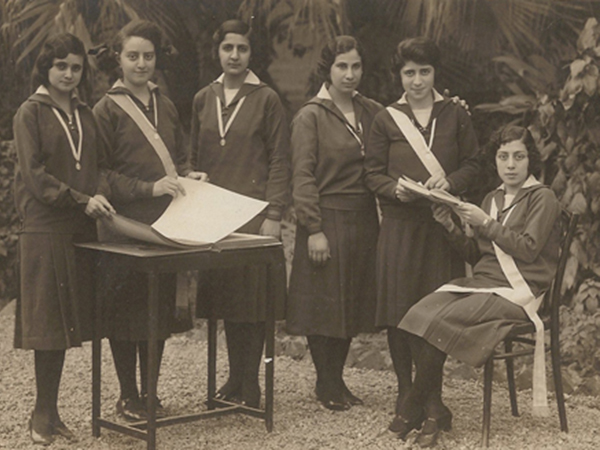
Students from the 1eme Class 1929

During the First World War the school acted as a refuge for those fleeing under both the Ottoman and German empires. The school also served as the chapel and camp for Australians while students helped to aid those wounded at the hospital set up at the Heliopolis Palace Hotel. Similarly, during the Second World War, the school housed many refugees freeing from Nazi-occupied France.

Following the revolution of 1952, the school underwent many changes. The structure of the school would no longer be a Catholic boarding school instead focusing on day classes and opening up its doors to non-Christians. Coinciding with this was a shift from a purely French educational system to one focused on the French-language and a new "franco-egyptian" curriculum.

In 2005, the school was certified by the Institut Français to include courses to prepare students for the French Baccalauréat but does not offer the exam itself.

== Architecture ==
The school's campus in Heliopolis has been noted for its distinct architecture in a neo-Mamluk style. It was in part designed by Édouard Empain as a part of his constructed city. The school would become a symbol of the neighborhood in Cairo and was even featured in a graphic novel and art installation in Dubai

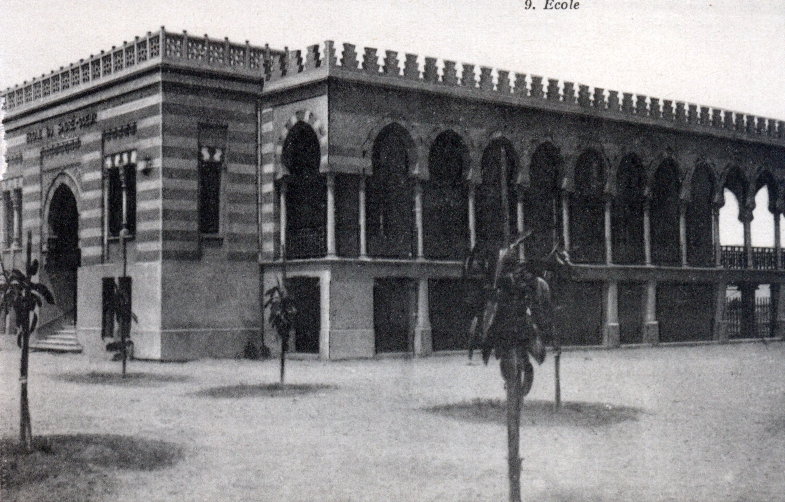
Primary School in 1929 highlighting Mamluk-inspired archways
