= Jeanne Dost =

American economist

Jeanne Dost was an American economist, educator, author and political activist who affected both the scholarship and political position of women in Oregon beginning in the 1970s.

A member of the Oregon State University Faculty from 1965 to 1991, Dost was instrumental in the creation of a Women Studies program, as well as a women's center at the university. In addition to her work at Oregon State, Dost influenced the larger Oregon political scene, particularly as the first president of the Oregon Women's Political Caucus in 1972.

In 1967 Dost was the first woman appointed to the editorial board of the scholarly journal Regional Science. Also that year, Dost was the only woman out of the nine economists invited to facilitate a National Conference on Mobility, sponsored by Cornell University. From 1967 to 1971 she became an Assistant Professor of Economics at Oregon State. In 1970 Dost was a part of the NSF Fellow in Urban Economics at Stanford University, where she was also the only female NSF Fellow.

From 1972 to 1974 Dost was the first president of the Oregon Women's Political Caucus, along with serving on the Steering Committee of the National Women's Political Caucus from 1971 to 1973. Beginning as a study group for faculty, Dost was one of the co-founders of OSU's Women's Center and Women's Studies Department in 1971. She served as the Director of the Women's Studies department and was heavily involved in politics and women's political organizations in Oregon.

She earned degrees from Washington State University (BA), Radcliffe College (MA), and Harvard University (PhD).
