= Eduard Matasek =

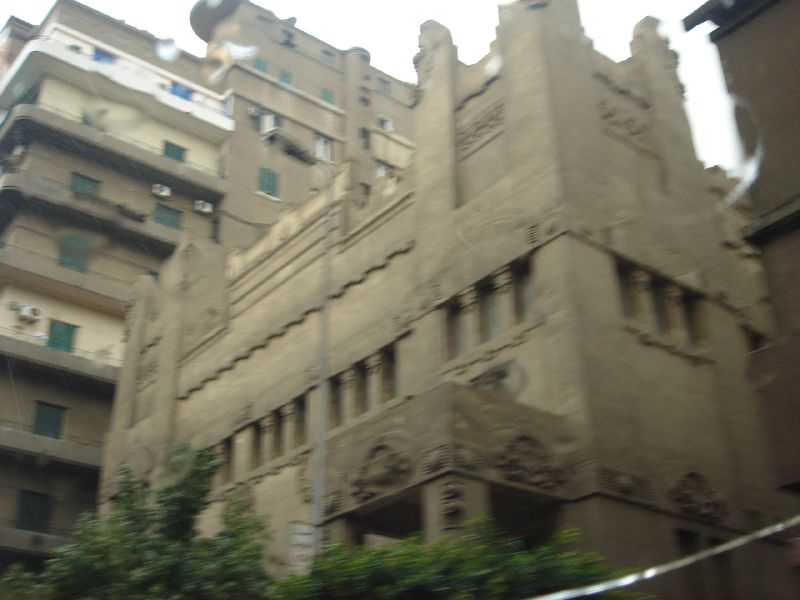
Sha'ar Hashamayim Synagogue

Eduard Matasek (1867–1912) was a noted Austro-Hungarian architect, best known for his Sha'ar Hashamayim Synagogue in Cairo. Himself a Roman Catholic, he designed it together with his (Jewish) partner Maurice Youssef Cattaui. He also designed the Dubara Palace in Cairo.
