= Dubara Palace =

Palace in Cairo

Coordinates: 30°02′32″N 31°14′01″E

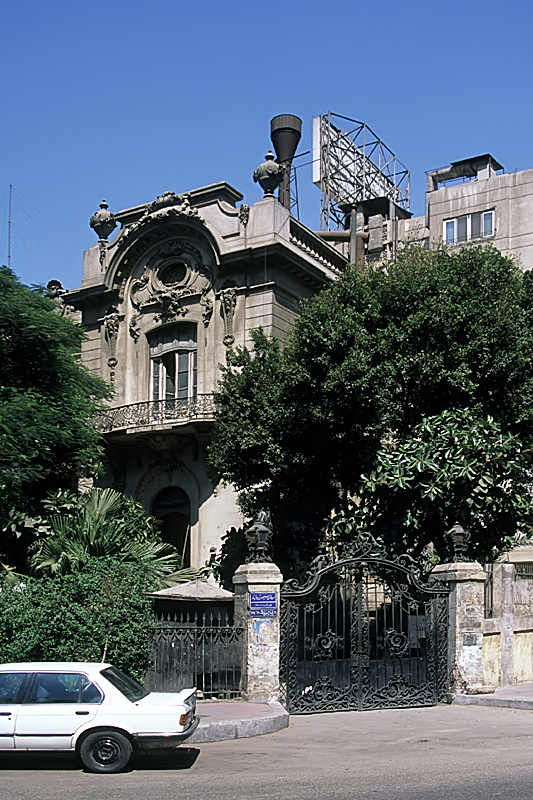
Dubara Palace

The Dubara Palace is located at the Simon Bolivar square in the north part of the Garden City district in downtown Cairo, Egypt. It is used for an evangelical church school. It is known as Villa Casdagli or Kasr EL-Dobara Experimental Language School, too.

== History ==
The Dubara Palace played a major role in modern Egyptian history. It witnessed many conflicts and negotiations between 19th and 20th century royal Egyptian leaders and politicians, Egyptian nationalists, and British "imperialist occupation" administrators.

Modeled after Central European hotels particulier in the same genre, Villa Casdagli, now a decaying relic of the past, was built during the first decade of the 20th century by Austrian architect Edward Matasek (1867-1912) reportedly for account of Emanuel Casdagli, a British educated Levantine family of Anatolian Greek origins as the name would suggest, dealing in the lucrative export import trade exporting cotton to England and importing Manchester textiles. [Possibly the house was originally built for banker Felix Suares and, following his death in April 1906, his heirs sold it circa 1909 to the Casdaglis]

Although Kasr al-Dubara is today mainly a hotel, office and banking district, it was once Cairo's top drawer residential quarter and home to several members of the Egyptian royal family who built their palaces there, hence the names Kasr al-Nil, Kasr al-Aali, Kasr al-Dubara, etc. (Kasr meaning palace).

No 1 Midan Kasr el Doubara in the early 1900s, probably about 1911. This villa had been the British Agency and was occupied by Lord Cromer and then Sir Eldon Gorst.

During the first half of this century, Kasr al-Dubara was also the embassy district. When the Casdaglis (Emanuel, later his sons: Alexis and Theodore) were not 'at home' they leased their villa to senior diplomats or diplomatic agencies. In fact, one of Villa Casdagli's pre WW-II tenants was the American Embassy.

It was not uncommon in those days for America to lease premises rather than outright buy them. But in March 1947 things changed, when, acting on instructions of the American State Department, US Ambassador Somerville Pinkney Tuck purchased part of the present day embassy compound. This was to become the first ever Egyptian real estate property owned by the American government.

Situated at No. 5 Kasr al-Walda Pasha Street (later Amrika al-Latinia St.), Pinkey Tuck's new quarters were a stone's throw from Villa Casdagli. Like the latter villa, it too belonged to a wealthy merchant-businessman, this time a Syrian called Alexander Chedid Bey.

Over the years and as American interests in Egypt expanded, the State Department purchased the contiguous properties including Villa Rolo which had also been built by Matasek. Turned into the American Library it was partly burnt down during the 1958 riots. Villas Chedid and Rolo were eventually pulled down, along with the apartment building which had replaced Villa Ades, to accommodate the impregnable American fortress which now occupies the entire hexagon.

Behind Villa Casdagli stood, until recently, Villa (Polychroni) Cozzica which belonged to a wealthy Greek family by the same name. For a long time, the Cozzicas held the monopoly of distilled alcohol in Egypt.

The Villas situated No. 7 Sheikh al Arbain street and No 9 Sheikh al Barakat Street belonged to Héphestion Epaminondas Kyriazi (cf. Kyriazi Frères). The No 7 Sheikh al Arbain was first leased to Mohamed Mahmoud Pacha, Minister of Finance of Egypt and then to the German Legation in Cairo

== Villa Casdagli's artchitect ==
In his younger days, Villa Casdagli's architect worked and apprenticed for a number of famous Austrian architects including Joseph von Wieser, Arnold Lotz, Ferdinand Fellner and Herman Helmer. It was most probably at the recommendation of Max Herz Bey, the Khedivial court's rising architect, that Matasek took part in the design of the Egyptian display for the 1892 (3?) Chicago World Fair. This was to be in the shape of a Cairo streetscape.

From Chicago, Matasek traveled to Egypt where he joined the cabinet of Pattigelli Freres and later that of Maurice Cattaui Bey. Henceforth, Matasek occasionally crossed paths with his Austro-Hungarian compatriot and mentor, Herz Bey. By now Herz was firmly entrenched in the architectural annals of Egypt having built, restored and written about, several of Cairo's most distinguished monuments including the Islamic Museum and the Credit Foncier Bank on Abdelkhalek Sarwat Street. Both Herz Bey and his former protégé were members of the Comité; de Conservation des Monuments de l'Art Arabe.

Once in Egypt, Matasek designed several of the city's commercial and residential landmarks. Amongst his more famous works is the (listed) Jewish Synagogue, No. 17 Adly Pasha Street in downtown Cairo. Another is the Austro-Hungarian Rudolf Hospital in the now popular district of Shubra. There is also the German School of which parts were pulled down by al-Ahram, the state-owned newspaper and publishing giant.

Matasek also took part in the design of Credit Foncier's Cairo headquarters, today the Arab International Bank.

Some of Matasek's minor works can be found in the Cairo suburb of Maadi. These include Villa Austria and Matasek's own house which he never occupied in view of his unexpected death during its construction. His fasswerk style villa was pulled down in 1995, weeks after the American Embassy (its last owner) sold it to a developer.

Perhaps friends of Cairo's landmarks within the business community would like to participate in the “Adopt A Monument Program” starting with Villa Casdagli. Suffice to reinstate the villa’s inimitable Byzantine hall so that the restorer will be guaranteed a place in heaven right next to Saint George who is so well depicted in both the Villa’s celestial ceiling and the hall’s extraordinary cloister. The positive fallout from such an effort would be enormous striking a rich chord in this highly visible section of Cairo where it counts most. It would also be perceived as part of the city's effort to repair the moral and physical damage caused by decades of neglectful municipal administration and the onslaught of developers.

In the case of Villa Casdagli an appropriate and highly visible plaque could be appended on its exterior evidencing this was once the American Embassy. Another plaque would indicate that the restoration of this hotel particulier to its formal splendor was made possible by the generous donations of e.g. Philanthropists & Co. In turn, the government, which suffers from a very serious image problem when it comes to saving our architectural cultural heritage, will have its chance to turn over a new leaf and show that it really means business.

Midan Kasr al-Dubara (now Simón Bolívar) could become one of Cairo's most creditable landmarks bringing together the great liberator of South America, a restored Central European hotel particulier, the Mosque of Omar Makram where Egypt's rich and famous are chronically mourned, several infitah banks, the Semiramis Intercontinental Hotel and the dreaded Mogamaa building, a potent symbol of Egypt's titanic bureaucracy. A remarkable juxtapose if there was ever one!

== See also ==
- History of modern Egypt
