= Dost Mohammad =

Dost Mohammad (Urdu/Dari: دوست محمد), Dost Mohammad, Dost Mahomet and other variants is a male Muslim given name meaning friend of Muhammad. Notable bearers of the name include:

- Dost Muhammad (Moghul Khan) (c.1445–1468/9), Khan of Aqsu in Moghulistan
- Dost Mohammad of Bhopal (c.1657–1728), founder of the Bhopal State in central India
- Dost Mohammad Khan (1793–1863), Amir of Afghanistan, founder of the Barakzai dynasty
- Dost Muhammad Khan Chowdhury, 18th-century zamindar of Natore, Bengal, India
- Haji Dost Muhammad Qandhari (1801–1868), Afghan Sufi master
- Dost Mahomet (c.1873–1909), Australian cameleer
- Dost Mohammad Khan Baloch (died 16 January 1930), ruler of Western Baluchistan until 1928
- Dost Muhammad Khan (judge) (born 1953), judge of the Supreme Court of Pakistan
- Dost Muhammad Khosa (born 1973), Pakistani politician
- Dost Muhammad Rahimoon (born 1976), Pakistani politician, former Member of the Provincial Assembly of Sindh
- Dost Muhammad Mazari, Pakistani politician, Deputy Speaker of the Provincial Assembly of Punjab
- Dost Muhammad Khan (senator), Pakistani politician, member of the Senate of Pakistan

== Other people ==
- Several "Afgan" cameleers in Australia, 1860s–1930s

== See also ==
- Dust Mohammad, a city in Iran
