= Wardeyan =

Al Wardian
- Neighborhood
- Location in Egypt
- Coordinates: 31.161036°N 29.877048°E
- Country: Egypt
- Governorate: Alexandria
- Time zone: UTC+2 (EET)
  - Summer (DST): UTC+3 (EEST)
- Postal code: 21553
- Website: alexandria.gov.eg

Al Wardian (Arabic: الورديان) is a neighborhood in Alexandria, Egypt.

Al Wardian neighborhood is located in Alexandria, specifically in the western part of Alexandria, near Alexandria Port. It is one of the best popular areas due to the well planned streets, and the high population.

Al Wardian is one of the archaeological sites, the "Wardian Cemetery" is one of its monuments, probably dating back to 300 BC. "Wardian Cemetery" was transferred to Kom Al-Shqafah to save the cemetery from water flood, it is now Catacombs of Kom El Shoqafa, which is characterized by the unique architectural style.

== See also ==
- Neighborhoods in Alexandria
