= Degree Online Services Telangana =

Degree admission system in India

Degree Online Services, Telangana
- Acronym: DOST
- Type: Admission
- Year started: 2015
- Duration: 3 hours
- Offered: Once a year
- Regions: India
- Website: dost.cgg.gov.in

Degree Online Services Telangana known as DOST is a unified, online degree admission system for students in Telangana, India by Government of Telangana. The DOST online service, brings all government colleges, autonomous colleges, private and aided colleges under one system. Over 1.84 lakh students were allotted seats in various degree colleges in all state universities in May and July every year.

== History ==
DOST was launched in 2016 to bring all degree college admission accessible to all students across the state by Telangana State Council of Higher Education (TSCHE).

== Admission process ==
In order to get an admission for bachelor's degree in universities in Telangana, they are required to register on the DOST portal. The universities are Osmania University, Kakatiya University, Telangana University, Mahatma Gandhi University, Satavahana University and Palamuru University.

Aspiring students register their web options on the official website and opt for colleges. After the admission process begins, the students receive SMS when a seat is allotted in a degree college.

The student admission process was linked to biometric system in 2017-18. For the academic year 2018-19, it was linked with Aadhaar of students. There are 3 phases in the admitting the students.
