= Alexandria Corniche =

Promenade corniche in Alexandria, Egypt

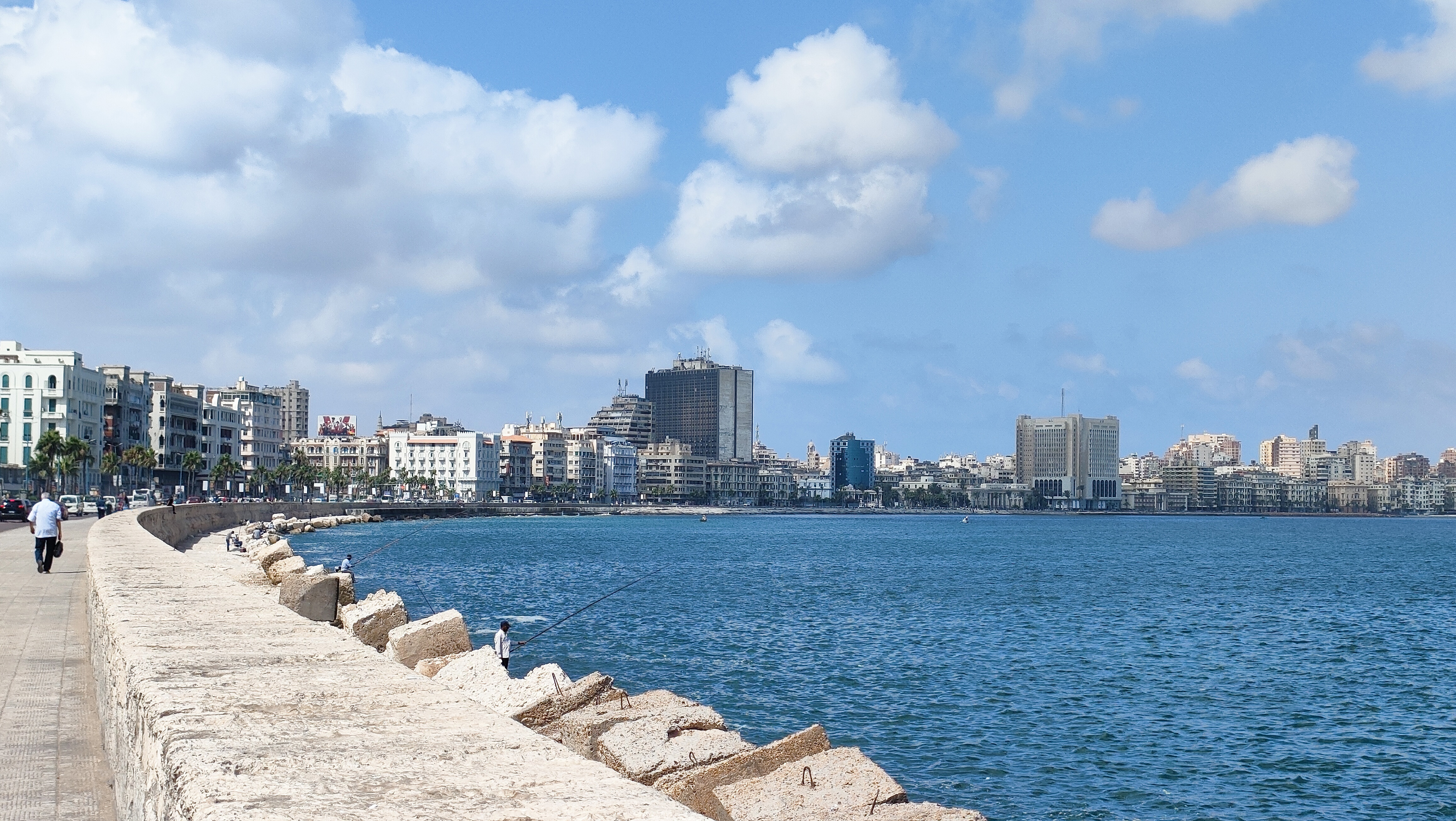
Alexandria at the Corniche in June 2022.

The Corniche (Arabic: الكورنيش, El Kornesh) is a waterfront promenade corniche in Alexandria, Egypt, running along the Eastern Harbour. It is one of the major corridors for traffic in Alexandria, alongside Abu Qir Street, the Ring Road, and the Mahmoudia Axis. The Corniche is formally designated "26 of July Road" west of Mansheya and "El Geish Road" east of it; however, these names are rarely used.

Italian-Egyptian architect Pietro Avoscani designed it in 1870. Construction of the Alexandria Corniche began during the period of Ismail Sedki Pasha's ministry during the reign of King Fuad I in 1925, and it was officially opened in 1935.

The road extends from the Bahri area in the Customs district in the west by the Citadel of Qaitbay (built in place of the Lighthouse of Alexandria). It runs for over ten miles and ends at the Mandara area in the Montaza district in the east.

== History ==
The construction of the Alexandria Corniche began in 1925 and took approximately ten years in six phases. The first phase was built in the area between Silsila and Shatby, a distance of 786 meters. The second phase extended from Shatby to Camp Caesar. The third phase extended from Camp Caesar to Sporting. The fourth phase extended from Sporting to Cleopatra.

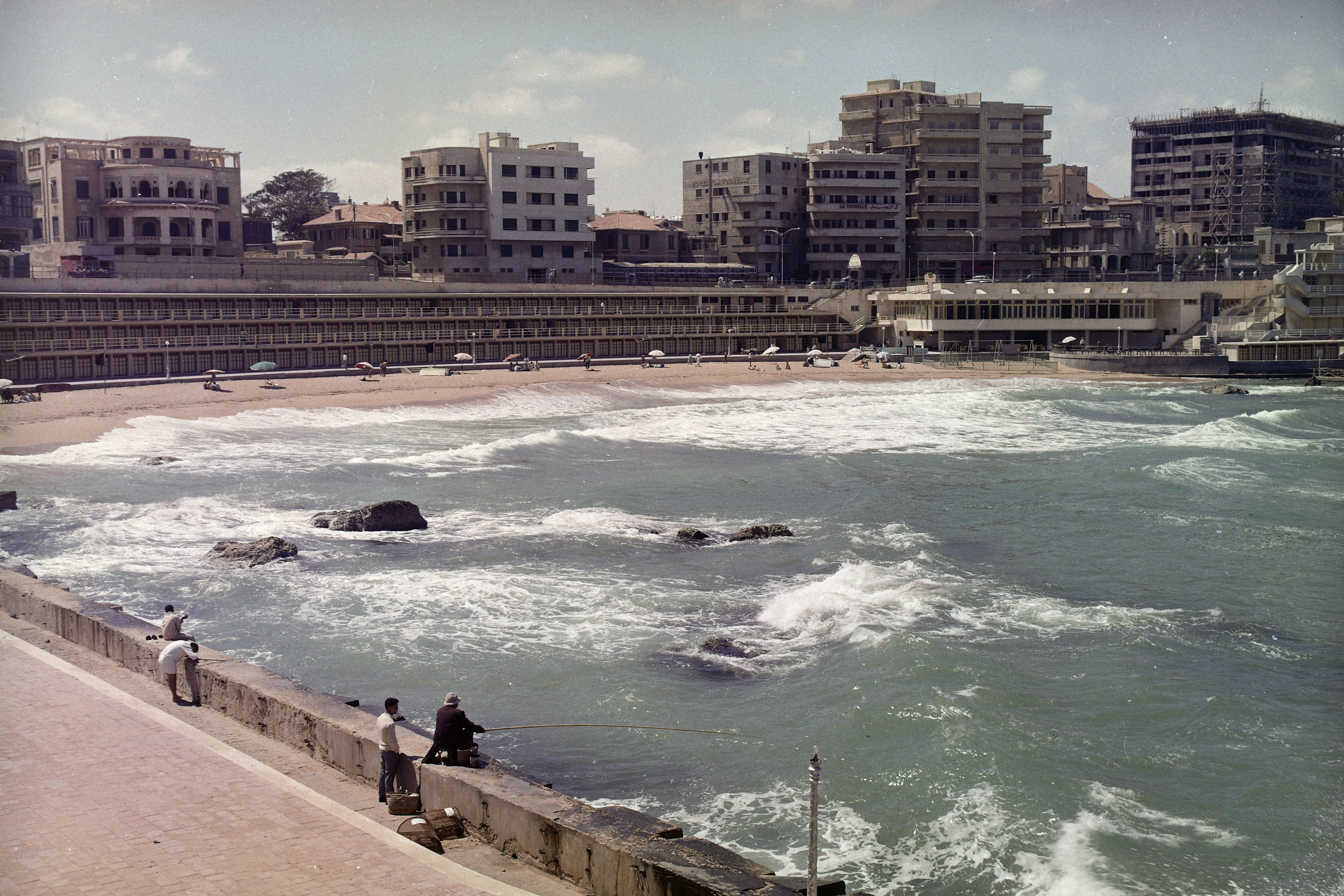
View of the corniche in Stanley in 1962

The fifth phase extended from Cleopatra to Stanley, passing through the Mustafa Pasha area, where the British occupation army camps were located at the time. This obstructed the Corniche's construction during this phase. The final phase extended from Stanley to the western walls of Montazah Palace, currently located in the Mandara district. The Corniche was completed in 1934.

In 2001, the Corniche Road underwent the largest and most extensive modification in its history. Nine beaches were completely destroyed to widen the road, increasing its width from 8 meters to 20 meters or more. The road began to enter the sea sand. This time saw the construction of the Stanley Bridge, and road widening work was completed between Victoria and Shatby.

During the beginning of the 2020s, the widening of the east part of the Corniche Road from 3 to 5 car lanes per direction were carried out, as a consequence the adjacent beaches shrinked considerably, which necessitate the reconstruction of existing leisure and walking infrastructure.

== Gallery ==
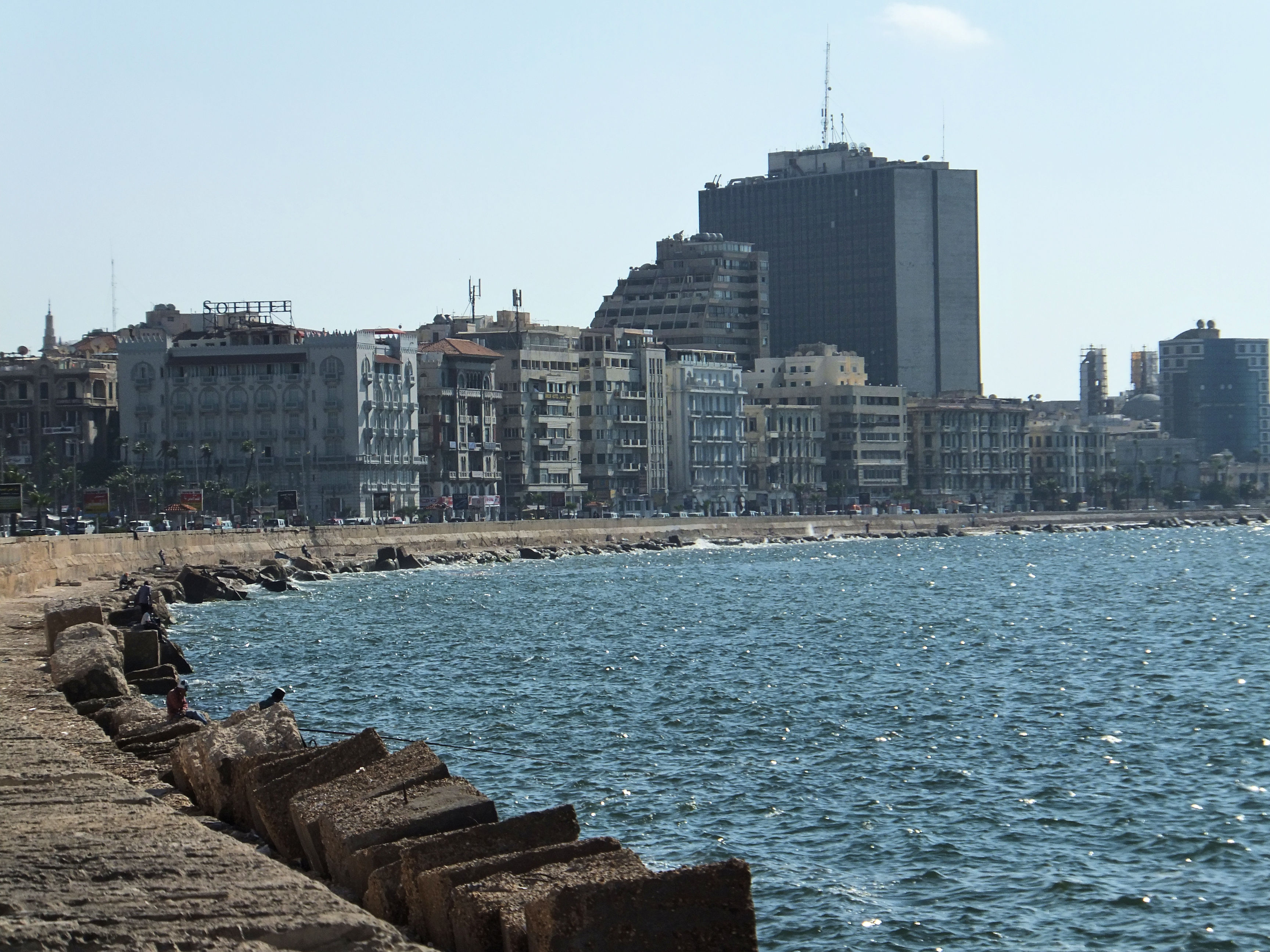
The Corniche in the Azareeta area

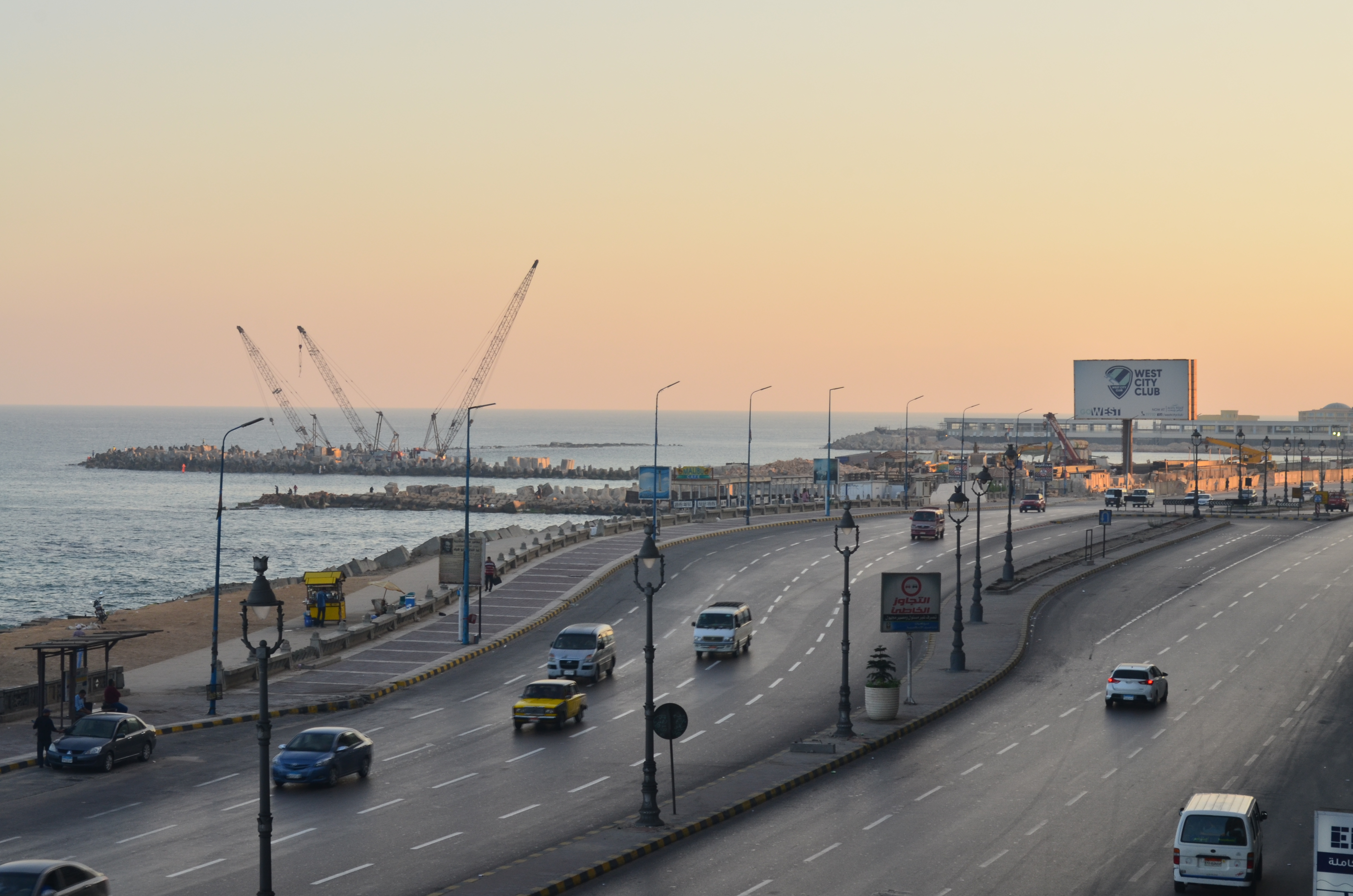
The road in the Cleopatra area

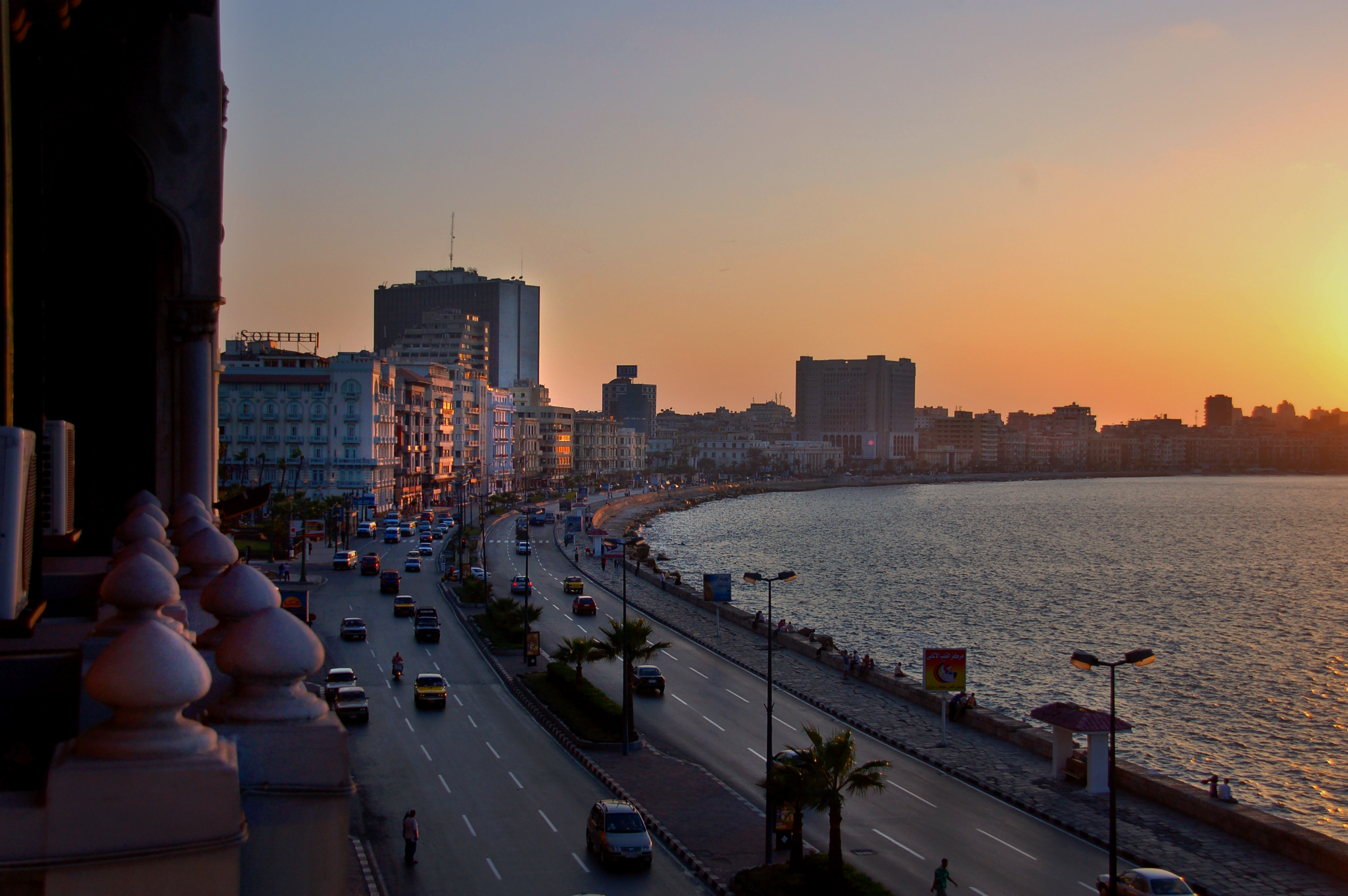
Road in the Raml Station area

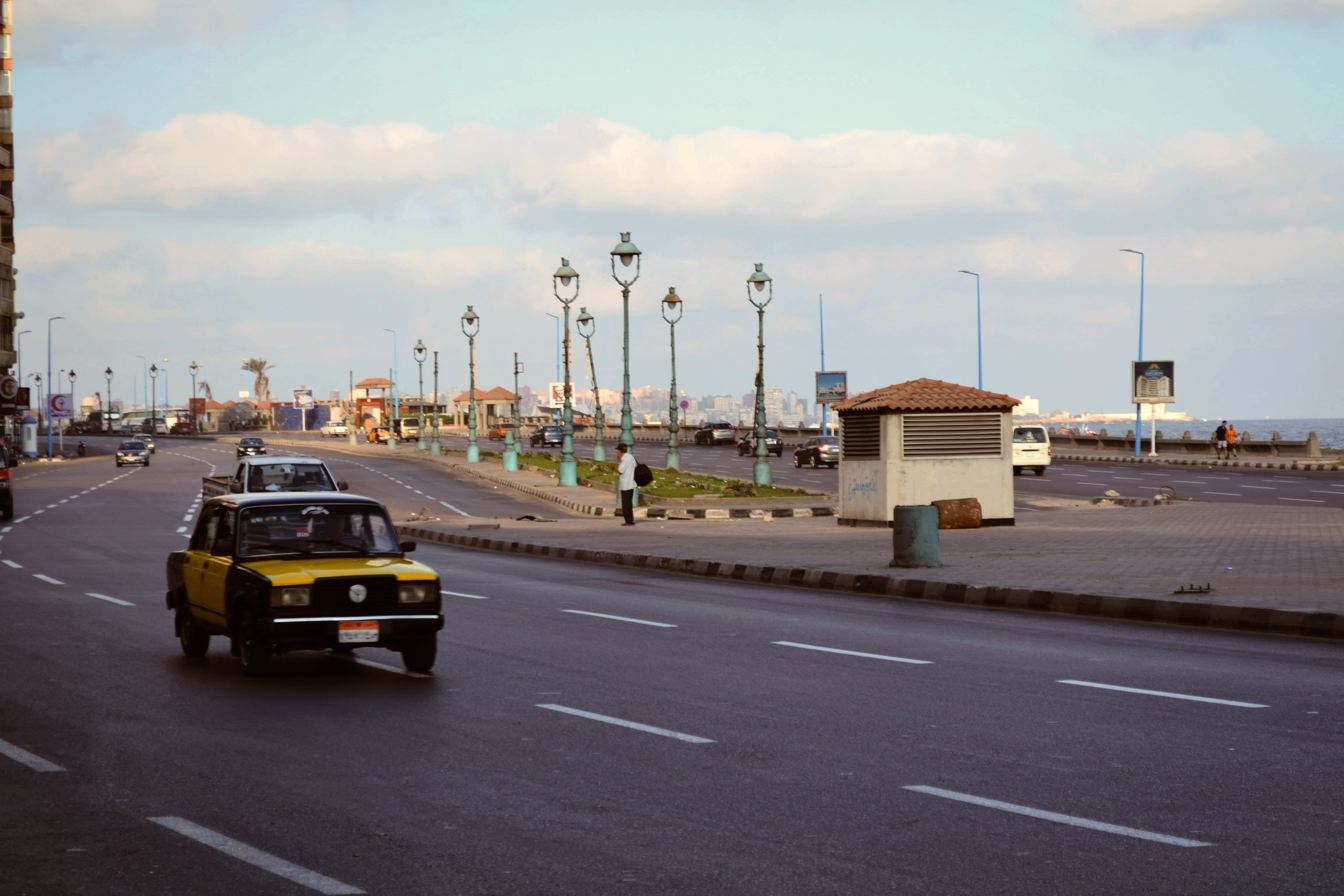
Road in the Sporting area

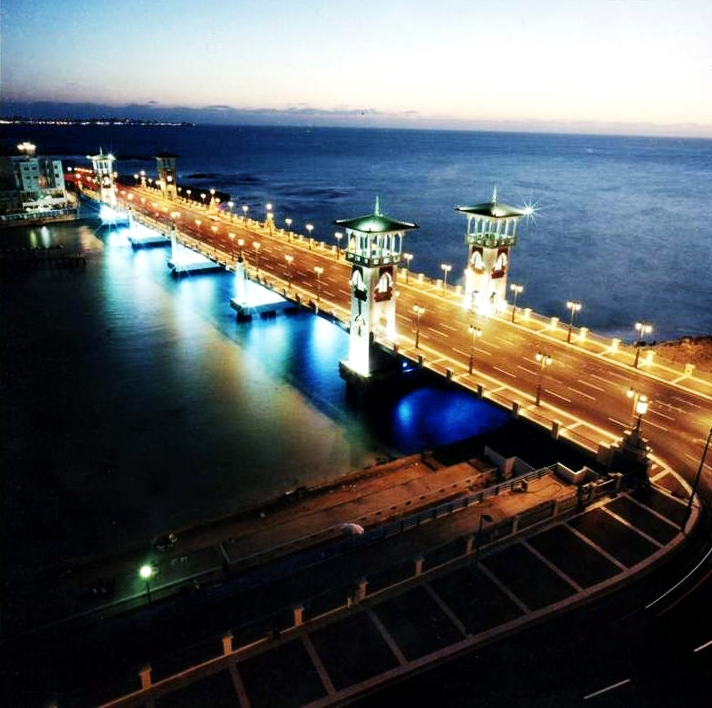
Stanley Bridge part of the Alexandria Corniche

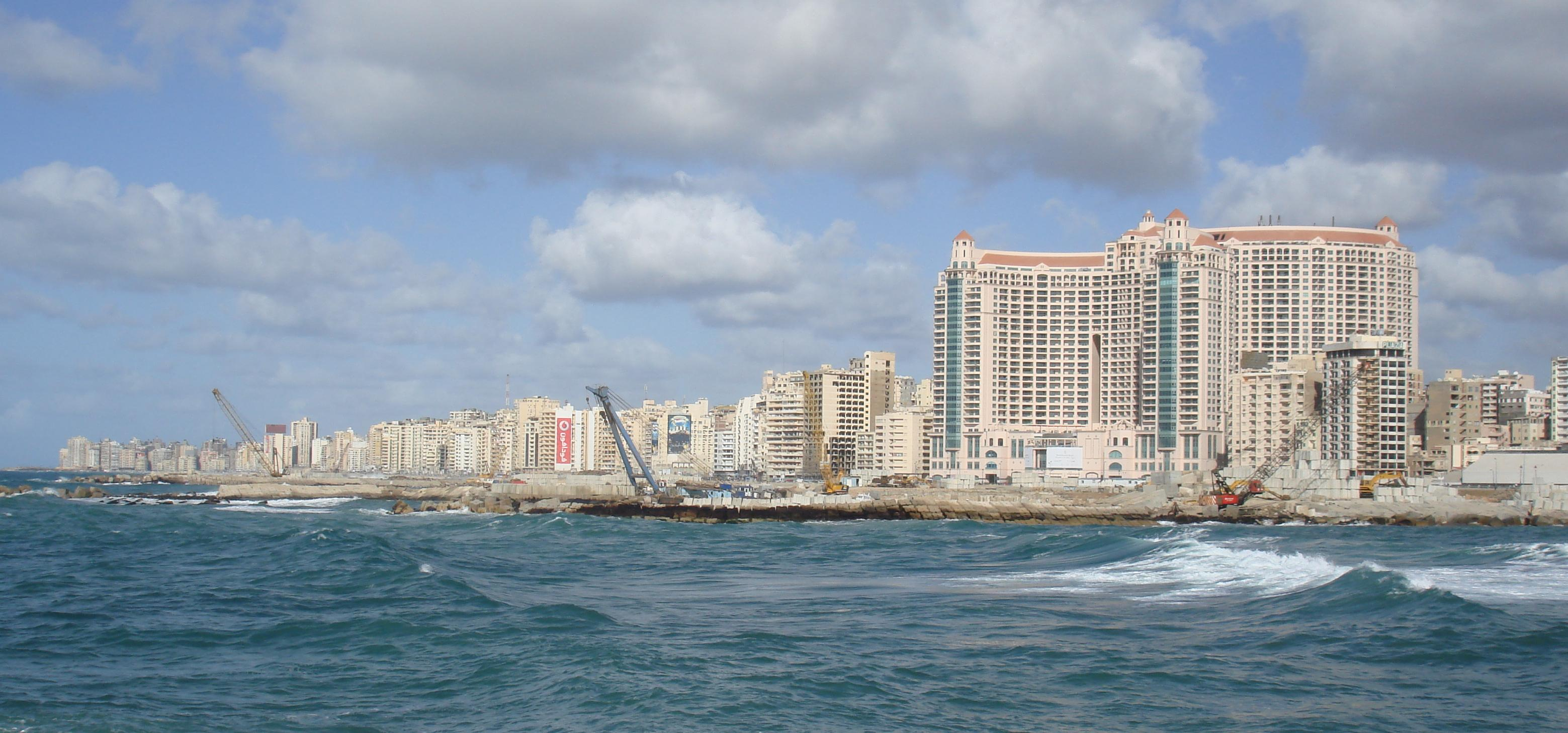
San Stefano Grand Plaza

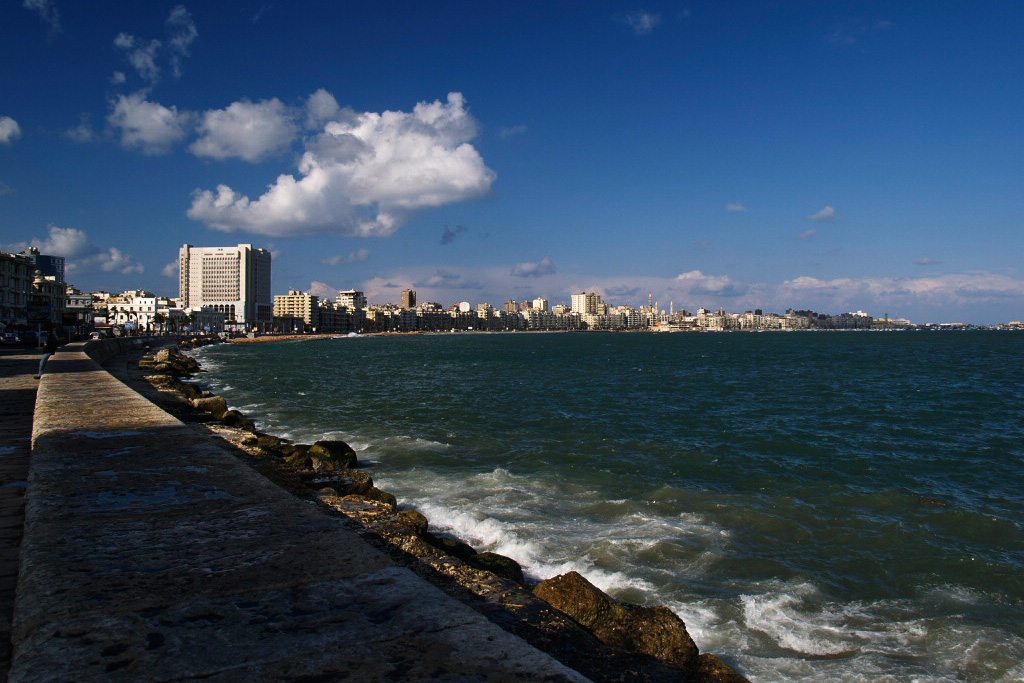
The beginning of the Corniche Road - and it appears on the other side of the Eastern Port area of the Anfoushi Gumruk District.

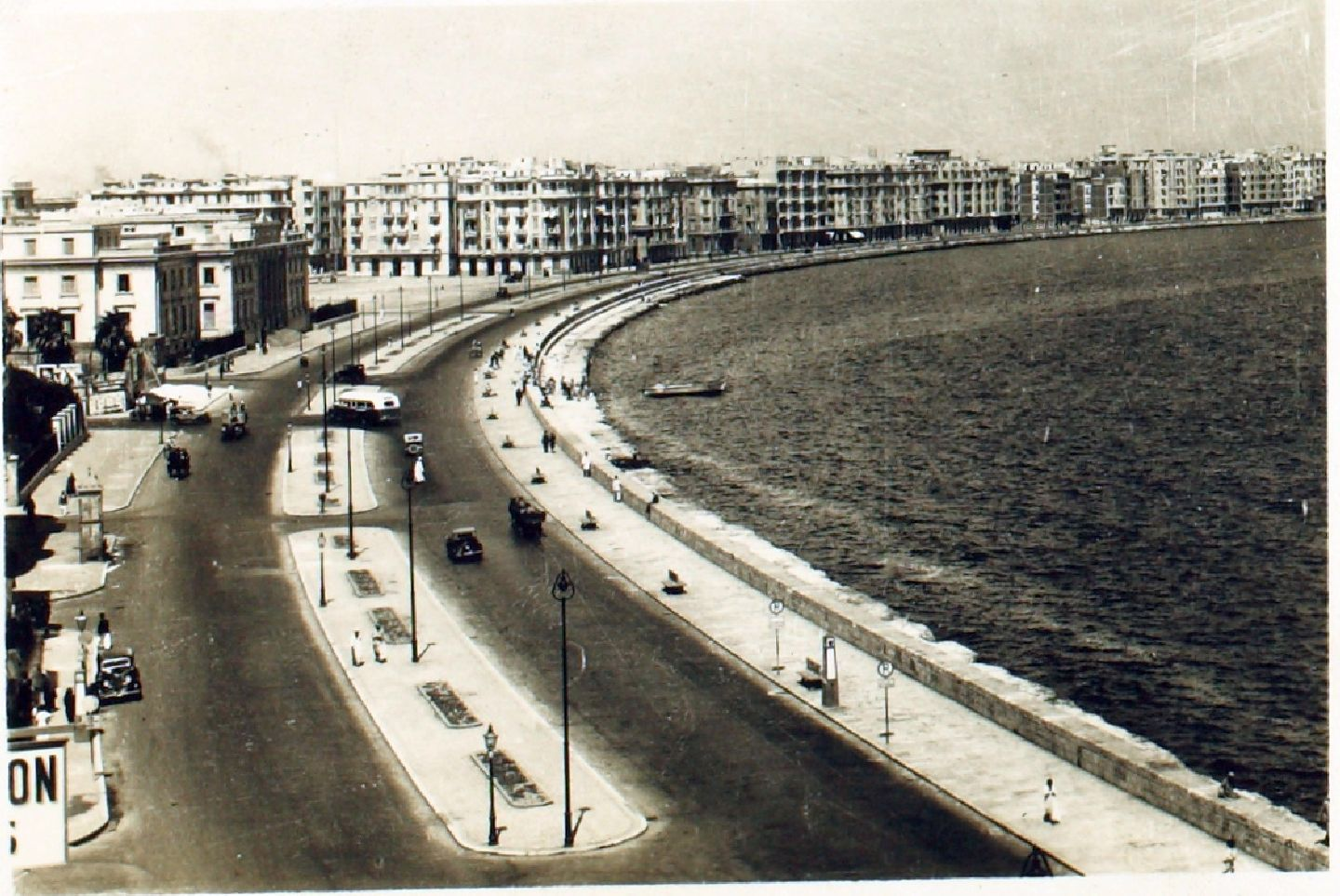
The Corniche in the Mansheya area in 1944
