= Sidi Bishr Mosque =

Mosque in Alexandria, Egypt

- مسجد سيدي بشر
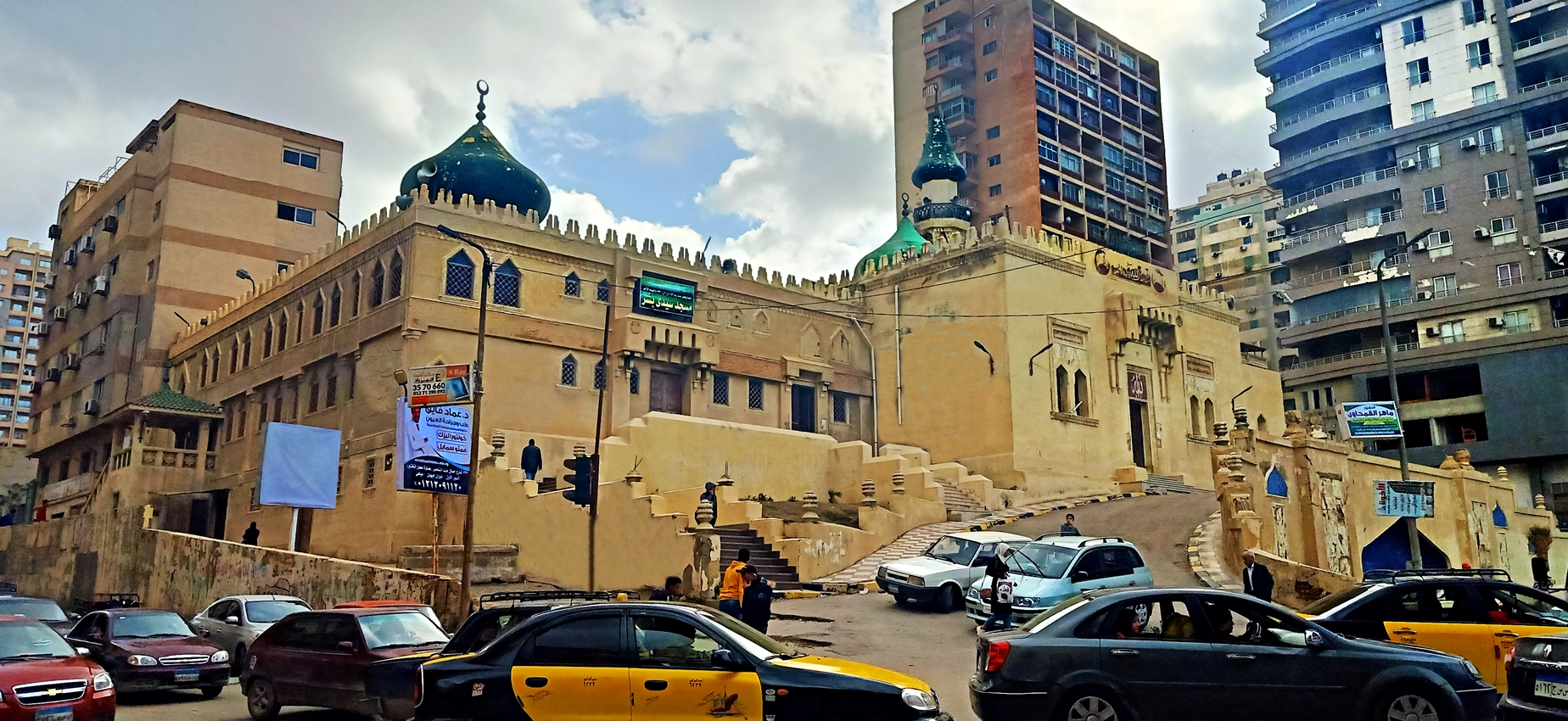

- Location of the mosque relative to the Nile Delta

Religion
- Affiliation: Islam
- Ecclesiastical or organizational status: Mosque
- Status: Active

Location
- Location: Sidi Bishr, Alexandria
- Country: Egypt
- Interactive map of Sidi Bishr Mosque
- Coordinates: 31°15′42″N 29°59′07″E

Architecture
- Type: Mosque
- Completed: late 19th century (original); 1945 (renovations)
- Dome: 1

The Sidi Bishr Mosque (Arabic: مسجد سيدي بشر, romanized: Masjid Sīdī Bishr) is a mosque located in the Sidi Bishr neighborhood of Alexandria, on the north coast of Egypt. The mosque is named in honour of Sheikh Bishr Ibn Al-Hussein Ibn Muhammad Ibn Ubayd Allah Ibn Al-Hussein Ibn Bishr Al-Jawhari, a sheikh from the late 5th-century to early 6th-century AH (late 11th-century to early 12th-century CE) who lived in Alexandria after coming from the Maghreb.

== Architecture ==
The mosque contains a rectangular sahn surrounded by porticoes. The mosque also has an iwan containing three porticoes made of octagonal columns bearing pointed arches. The iwan is divided into four corridors parallel to the wall of the qibla. On the western side of the iwan is a shrine containing a square-shaped room surmounted by a dome. The dome is considered the oldest part of the mosque, as it dates from the 19th century CE. The mosque has been renovated several times, most notably during the reign of the Khedive Abbas II of Egypt and in 1945, when its size quadrupled.

== See also ==
- Islam in Egypt
- List of mosques in Alexandria
- List of mosques in Egypt
