= Stanley Beach =

Stanley Beach may refer to:

- Stanley, Alexandria, Egypt
- Stanley, Hong Kong
