= Shatt al-Arab Corniche =

The Shatt Al-Arab Corniche, or Basra Corniche, is one of the most important tourist attractions in Iraq. It consists of a street and a promenade overlooking the Shatt Al-Arab River, located in Basra Governorate, in the far south of Iraq.

== Location ==
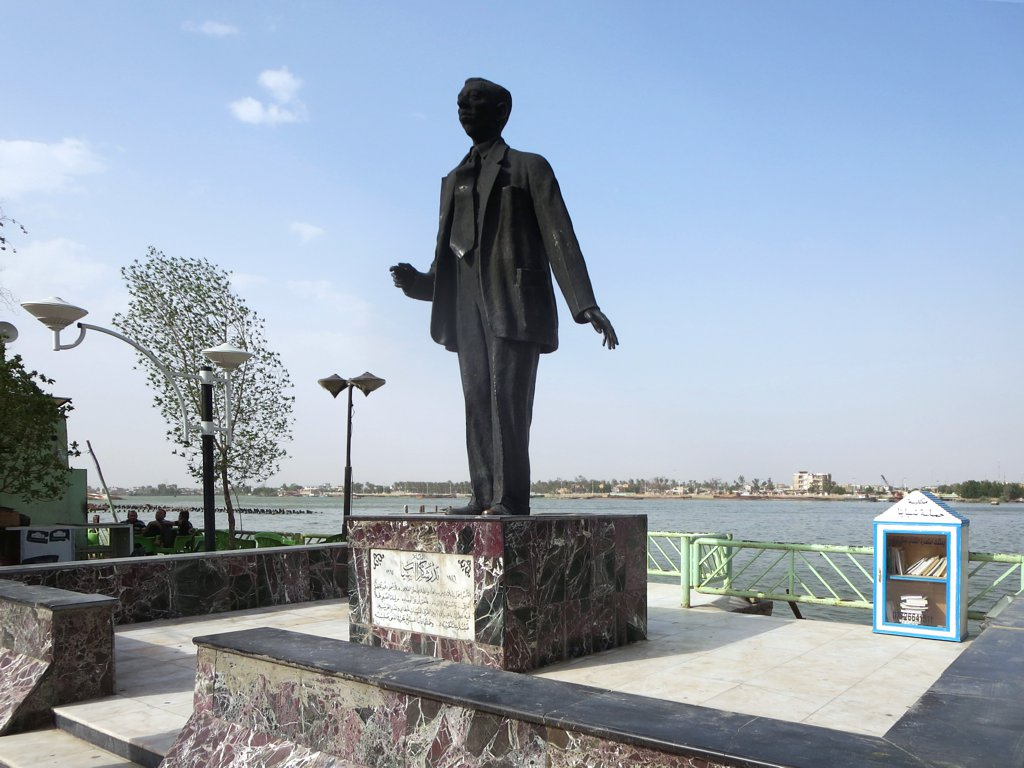
Statue of Badr Shakir al Sayyeb in Shatt al-Arab Corniche.

Corniche Street is located in the city of Basra, near the Shatt al-Arab. The street begins where the Al-Ashar River meets the northern side of the Shatt al-Arab and stretches to the Al-Baradiyah area in the south. The Shatt al-Arab Corniche covers a distance of 3 kilometers along the river, which spans approximately 204 kilometers in total, with a width ranging from 500 meters to 2 kilometers.

== The historical background ==
Historical photographs of Basra reveal that the city was once surrounded by walls, including a distinct fortification at the entrance to Al-Ashar River. Inside these walls stood Gardalan Castle, constructed in 1677. The Shatt al-Arab offered additional natural defense for the fortress, while the surrounding land was primarily agricultural. Significant transformations occurred in the Corniche area between the end of Ottoman rule and the onset of British occupation (1919–1929), introducing new architectural styles and functional uses that contrasted sharply with the city's older, more compact urban fabric. On August 4, 1940, municipal engineer Najib Nawras completed the design for Corniche Street, and construction commenced in 1941 after the municipal council approved the project and appointed experts to manage its implementation.
