= Roshdy =

Place in Alexandria, Egypt

Roshdy رشدى
- Neighbourhood in Alexandria
- Location in Egypt
- Coordinates: 31.224381°N 29.936646°E
- Country: Egypt
- Governorate: Alexandria
- City: Alexandria
- Time zone: UTC+2 (EET)
  - Summer (DST): UTC+3 (EEST)

Roshdi (Egyptian Arabic: رشدى) is an upper-class neighborhood in Alexandria, known for its greenery and is neighbouring the beautiful Stanley Bridge on the beach side.

== See also ==
- Neighborhoods in Alexandria
