= Stanley Bridge =

Stanley Bridge may refer to:

- Stanley Bridge (EastEnders), fictional character
- Stanley Bridge, a bridge in Stanley, Alexandria, Egypt
- Stanley Bridge, Prince Edward Island, an unincorporated area, located in Queens County, Prince Edward Island, Canada
