= Sidi Bishr =

Sidi Bishr سيدي بشر
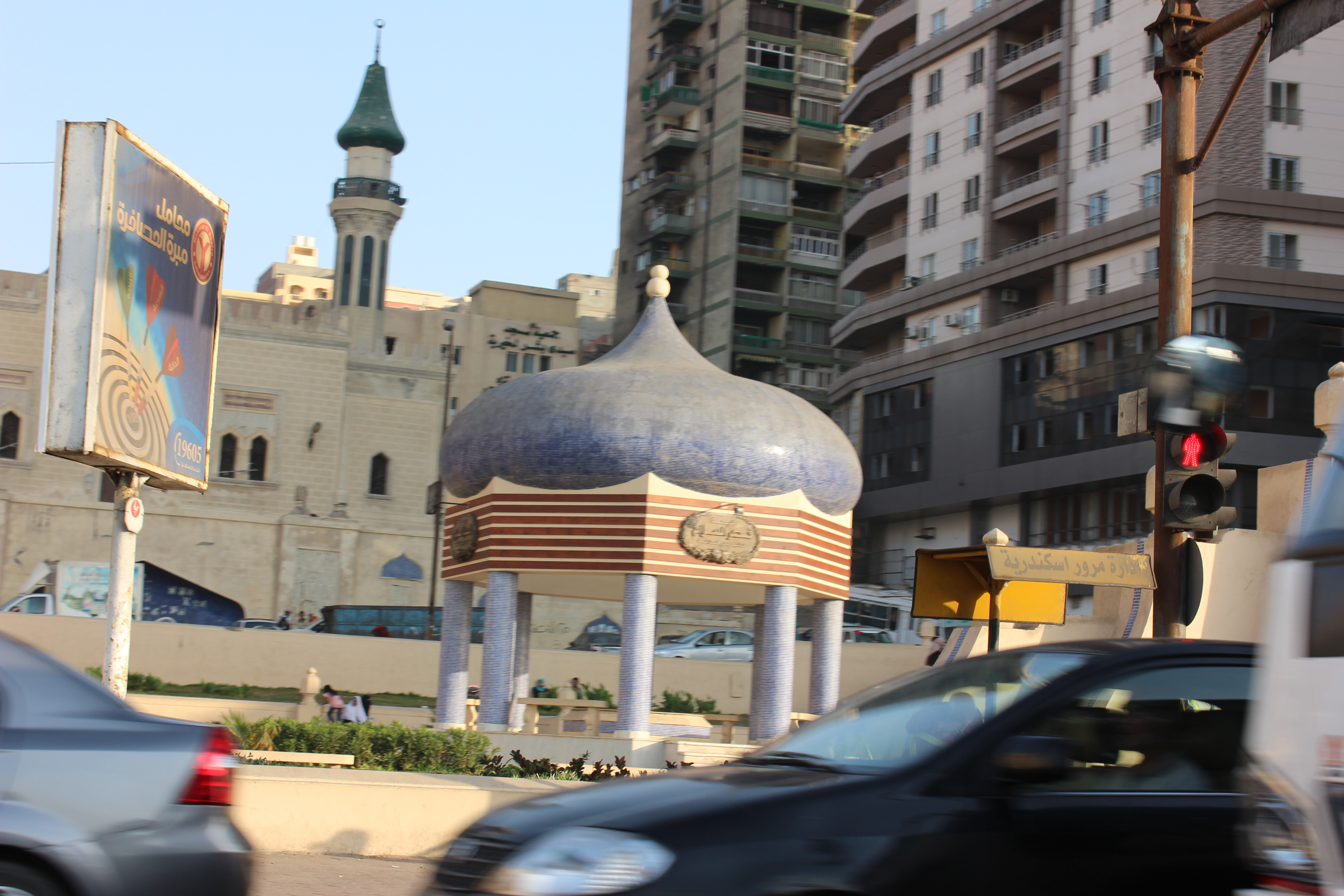
- Sidi Bishr, 2015

- Location in Egypt
- Coordinates: 31.252066°N 29.994464°E
- Country: Egypt
- Governorate: Alexandria
- Time zone: UTC+2 (EET)
  - Summer (DST): UTC+3 (EEST)

Sidi Bishr (Arabic: سيدي بشر) is a neighborhood in the Montaza District of Alexandria, Egypt. Established as a summering site by the Egyptian middle class before the Revolution of 1952, it has since become one of the largest neighborhoods of the city.

== Overview ==
The Coptic Orthodox Church of Saint Mark and Pope Peter—known locally as the Church of the Two Saints—located in Sidi Bishr, was the target of the 2011 Alexandria bombing on 1 January 2011; formerly suspected to be the work of terrorist group the Army of Islam, the Chief Prosecutor of Egypt has since accused the Interior Ministry of carrying out the bombing.

On 10 February 2015, the police headquarters of Montaza District was the scene of five bombs which exploded, injuring many civilians. Years after the Revolution of 2011, Muslim Brotherhood continue to respond to Morsi's overthrow and to the crackdown on members of their organization.

== History ==
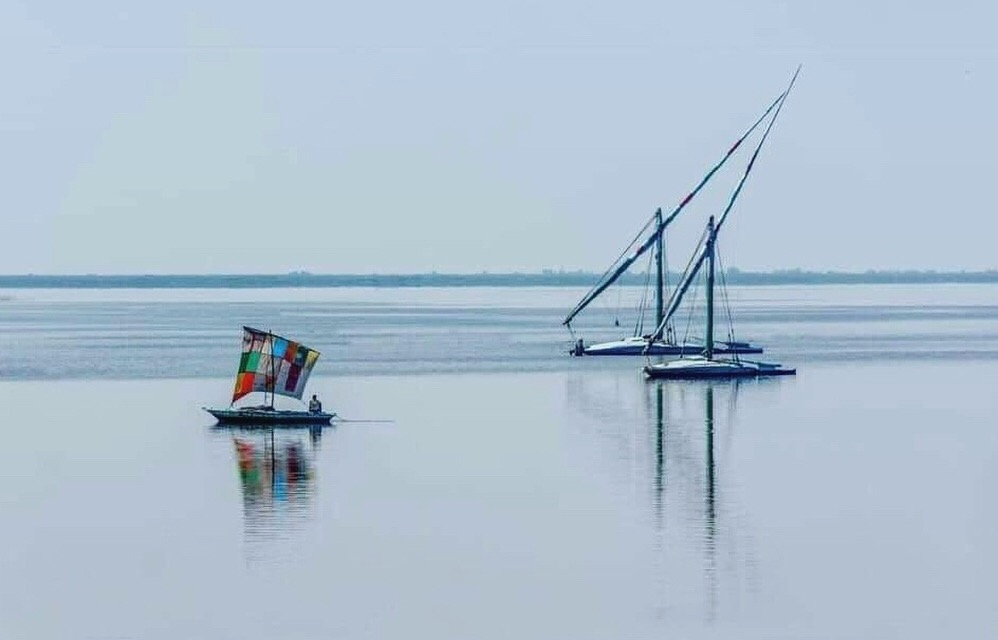
Sailing boats in Sidi Bishr

During World War I, there was an internment camp at Sidi Bishr, and Manwel Dimech was imprisoned there. During the war it was also the scene where the Mediterranean Forces camped and trained and occasionally enjoyed the waters of Sidi Bishr, where the coast wasn't so rocky.

In 1928, Sidi Bishr was a picturesque place on the edge of the desert and a decade later had been transformed with the extension of The Corniche. People visited Sidi Bishr's three beaches from around the world, making it cosmopolitan and a fashionable place to be. Lawrence Durrell's Justine describes the beach at Sidi Bishr as "a place where beautiful women from all over the world donned bikinis".

Since the Egyptian revolution of 1952, women no longer wear bikinis to public Egyptian beaches.

== See also ==
- Neighborhoods in Alexandria
