= Corniche =

Road on the side of a cliff or mountain

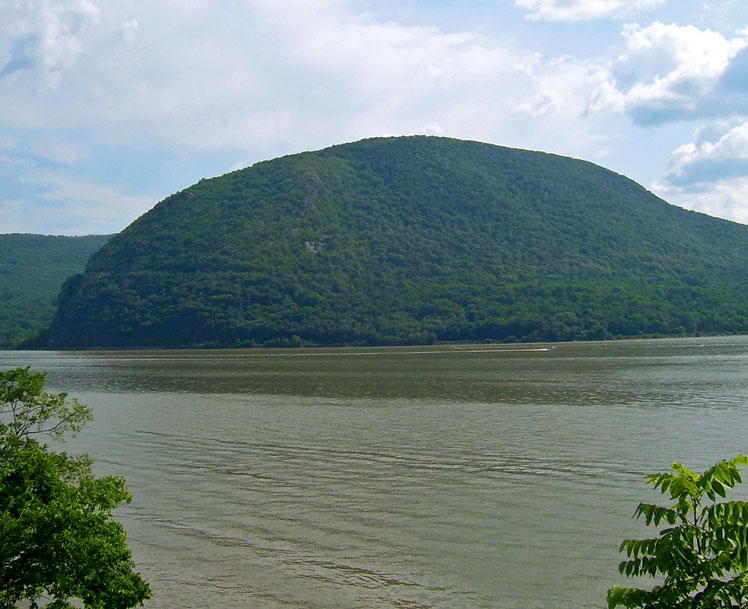
A corniche carrying New York State Route 218 along Storm King Mountain can be seen on the left from across the Hudson River

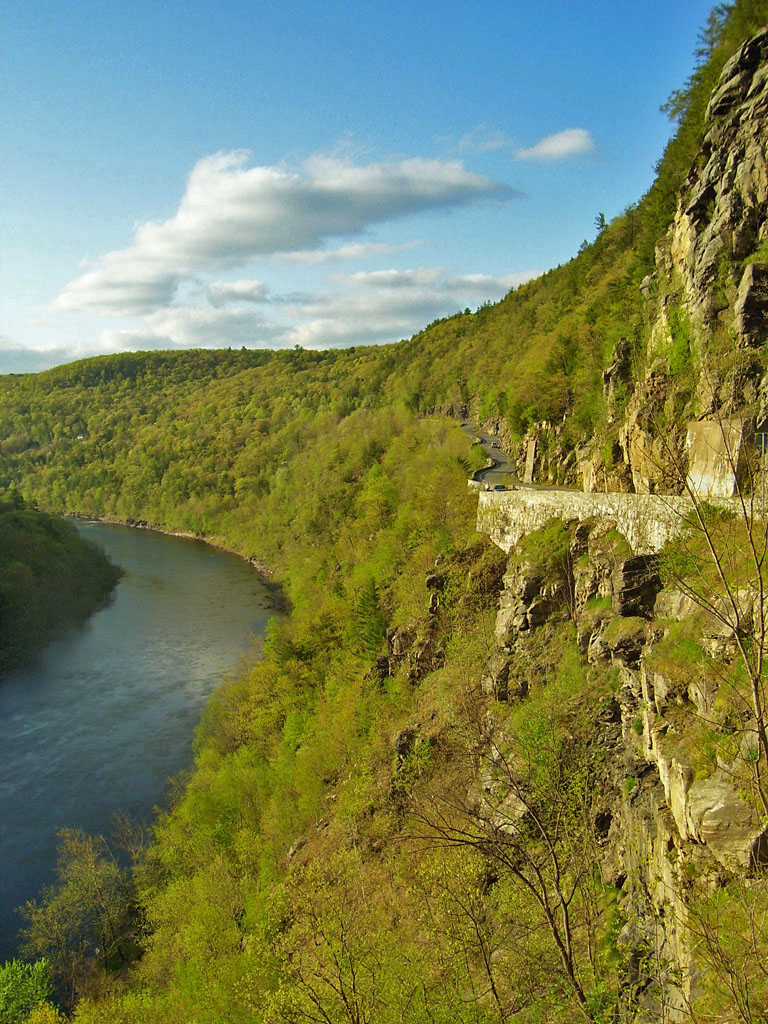
The Hawk's Nest is part of a corniche which carries New York State Route 97 above the Delaware River

A corniche is a road on the side of a cliff or mountain, with the ground rising up on one side of the roadway and falling away on the other. The English language has adopted the word from the French term route à corniche or "road on a ledge", itself derived from the Italian cornice, for "ledge".

== Europe ==
=== France ===
Three famed corniche roads of the Côte d'Azur in the French Riviera run between the sea and mountains from Nice eastward toward Menton. They are known as the Corniche Inferieure (or Basse Corniche) along the coast, the Moyenne Corniche slightly inland, and the Grande Corniche along the upper cliffs.

The Corniche Inferieure passes through the principality of Monaco. The Grande Corniche featured prominently in the Alfred Hitchcock film To Catch a Thief.

=== Italy ===
The Amalfi Drive, along the Amalfi Coast south of Naples, is a road carved into the cliffs along the Tyrrhenian Sea, and can be classified as a corniche. It runs between Sorrento and Amalfi and was originally built by the Romans.

== Africa ==
=== Senegal ===
The coastal road facing the Atlantic Ocean in the capital city of Dakar is called the Corniche Ouest and runs along a cliff above the beaches and rocky shores.

=== South Africa ===
Many of the roads running around the Cape Peninsula, south of Cape Town, have been constructed in the form of corniches. A good example is part of Victoria Road running through the suburbs of Clifton and Bantry Bay.

=== Libya ===
The Tripoli Corniche, also known as Al-Fatah Street, runs along the Mediterranean from the Waddan Bridge to the roundabout at Tripoli's sea port entrance.

=== Egypt ===
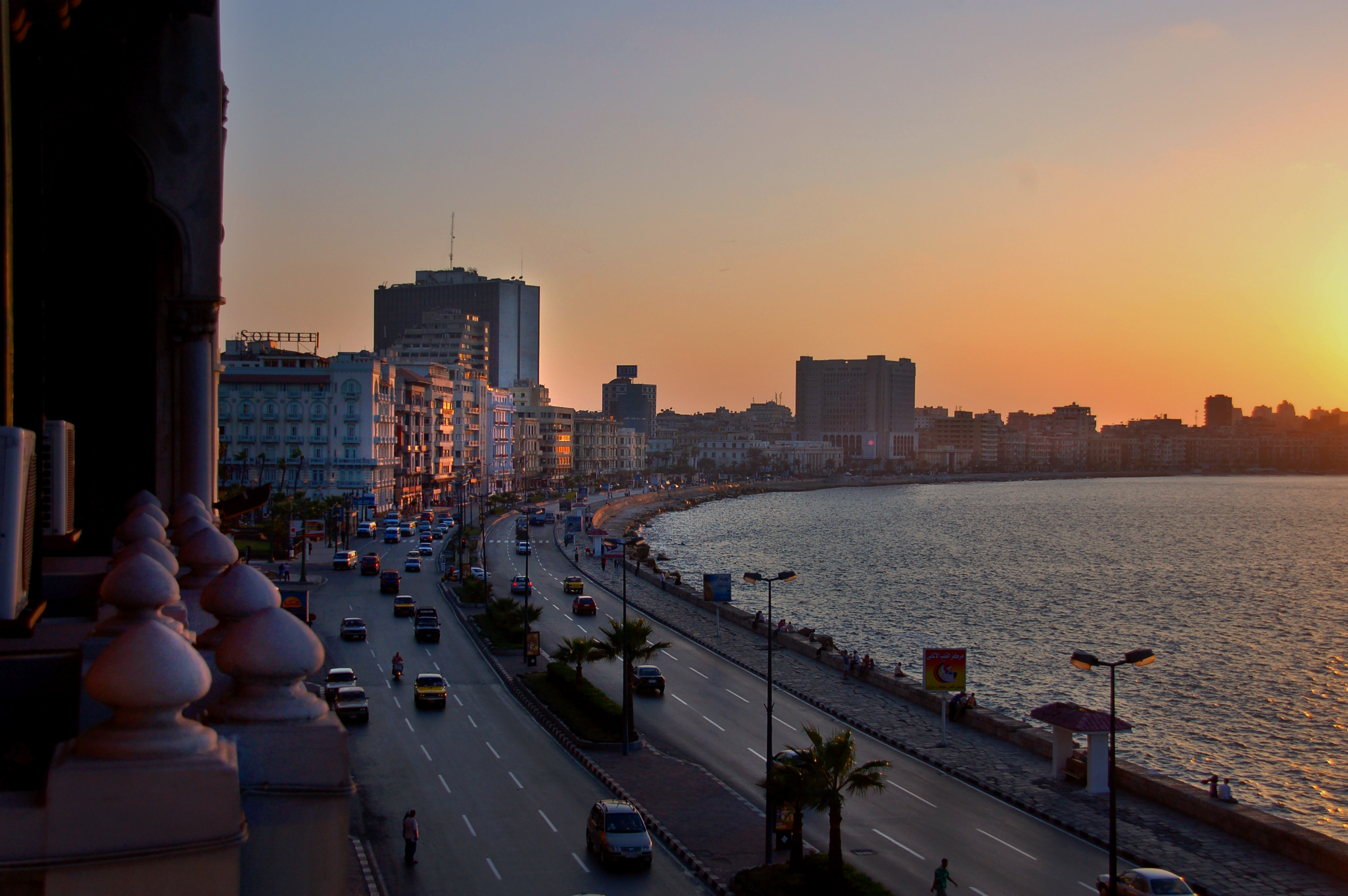
The corniche at Alexandria by sunset, stretching along the city's residential coast line

Any waterfront passage along a body of water is classed as a corniche in Egypt. Most Nile valley and Delta cities overlooking the 1000 km river course and two branches in the country have one or two corniche streets (east and/or west banks). For example "Corniche Giza" and "Corniche Cairo", the longest Egyptian corniche. Other cities such as Mansoura, Damietta and Luxor also have corniches.

- The 18 km Corniche al-Nil Street (Arabic: شارع كورنيش النيل) promenade in Cairo (east bank of the Nile) runs from the Maadi district in the south, to the mouth of the Ismailia Canal in al-Sahel district in the north. Building numbers take on one to two digits in Maadi where numbering starts, where for example the Holiday Inn hotel is 29 A Corniche al-Nile, and up to four digits in the northern half due to it length, where the Ramses Hilton hotel's address in Bulaq is 1115 Corniche al-Nil. The street colloquially takes on the names of some of the districts and neighbourhoods it passes through such as the Maadi Corniche, and Corniche Masr al-Qadima (Old Cairo).
- The promenade that runs from the Giza Zoo to the balloon theater in Agouza is colloquially known as the Giza Corniche.
- The promenade running from Montazah Palace walls to the Qaitbay Citadel in Alexandria is known as Corniche (Alexandria)

Though the word itself comes from French, the Egyptian usage has led neighboring Arab countries, which are not francophone and have no French influence, to adopt the word. These include Sudan, Saudi Arabia, the UAE and Qatar.

== Middle East ==
In the Middle East the word is used for several waterfront roads that are not true corniches, as they are near sea level and do not follow a cliff line.

=== Qatar ===
The Doha Corniche is a waterfront promenade extending for seven kilometres (4.3 miles) along Doha Bay in Qatar's capital city, Doha. Annual celebrations of national holidays such as Qatar National Day and National Sports Day are centered on the Doha Corniche. It is a popular tourist and leisure attraction within Qatar.

=== Lebanon ===
The avenue that runs along the western and northern coast of the Beirut peninsula is colloquially called Corniche Beirut.

=== Oman ===
The promenade along the waterfront in Muttrah, Muscat, is known as The Corniche.

=== United Arab Emirates ===
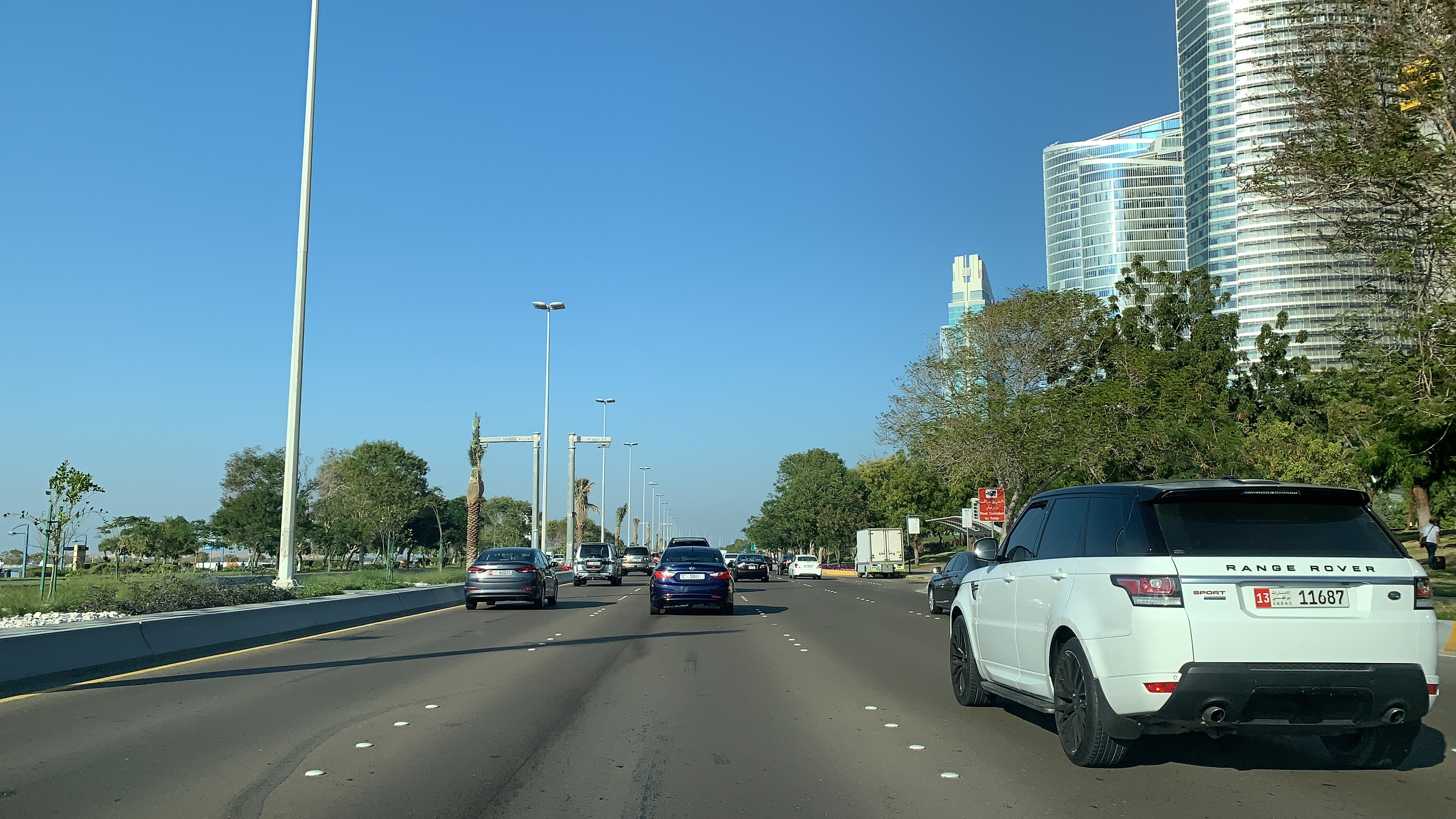
Driving along the Abu Dhabi Corniche

- The promenade that runs from the Emirates Palace hotel to the fish market in Abu Dhabi is colloquially called the Corniche.
- in Ajman, the corniche is the road that runs from Ajman Beach to Ajman Marina, with a view of the skyline of the city and the tall skyscrapers that stand along the road.
- In Sharjah, the road surrounding Khalid Lagoon is known as Buheira Corniche.
- Several other waterfront roads and promenades in the Emirates are also referred to as Corniche, including the Deira Corniche, Fujairah Corniche, and the Jumeirah Corniche.

=== Saudi Arabia ===
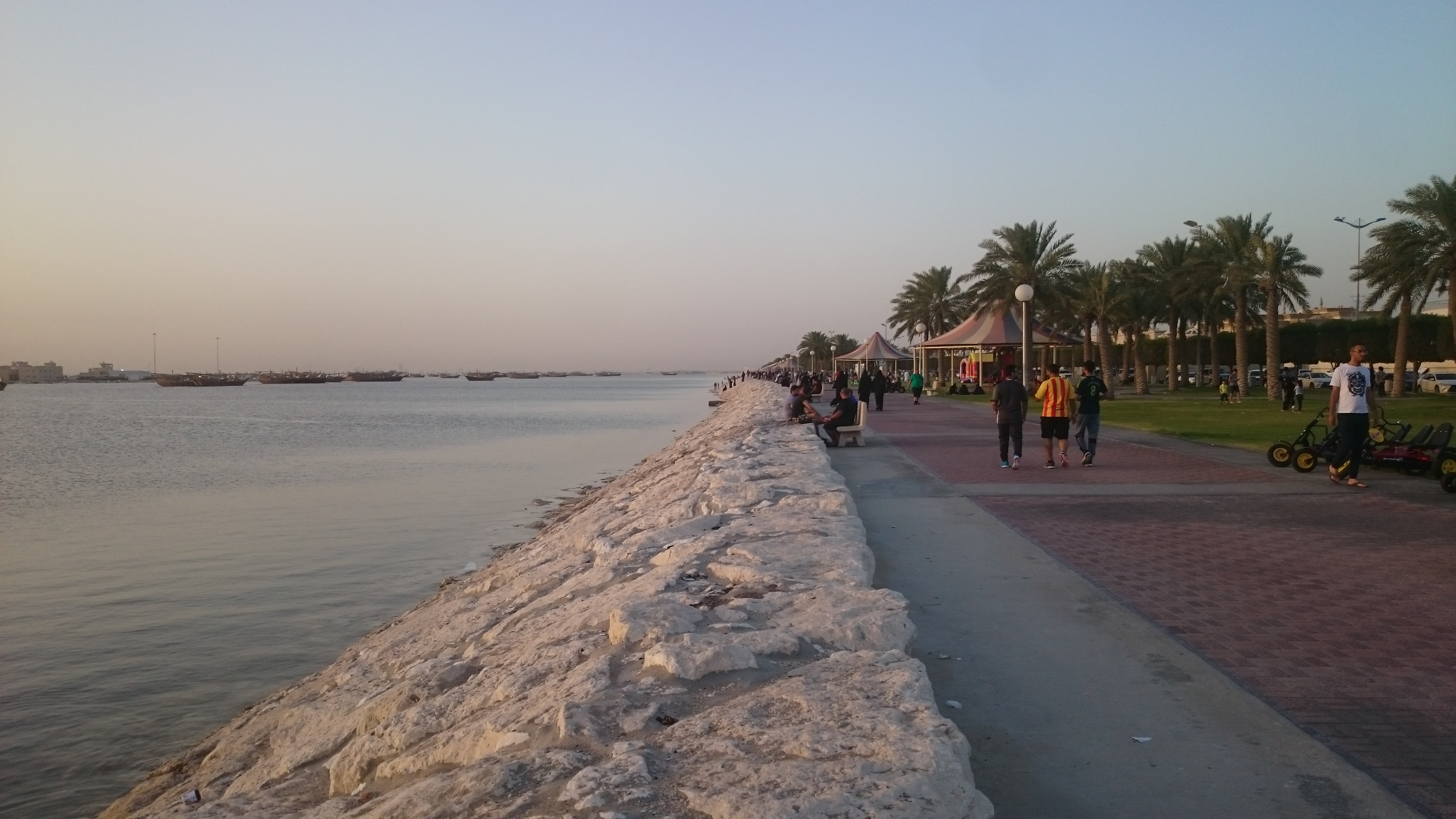
Qatif corniche

Dammam corniche, Qatif corniche, Khobar corniche, Ras Tanura corniche, Jeddah Corniche, Yanbu corniche, Al Jubail corniche, Khafji corniche.

=== Iraq ===
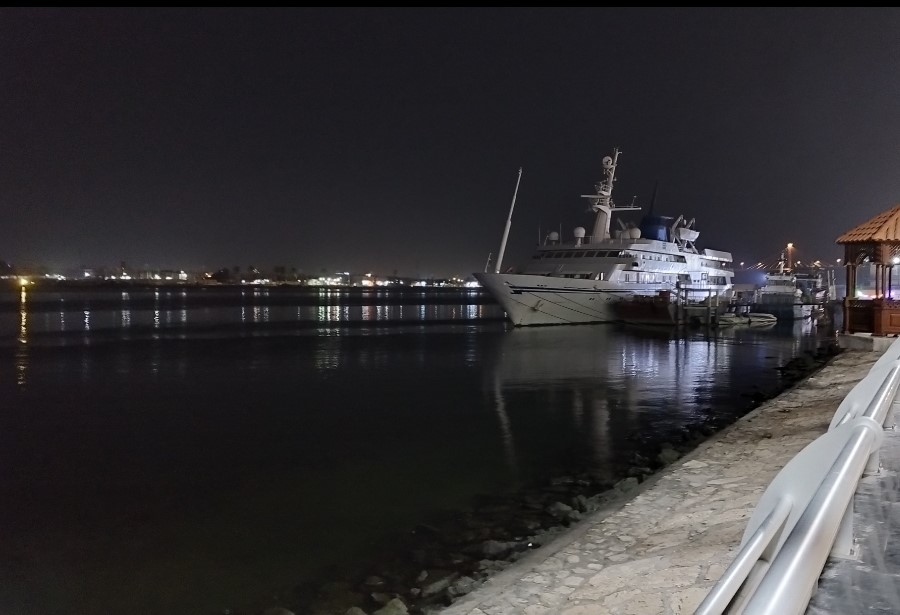
The corniche in Basra

In Basra, the corniche runs along the Shatt al-Arab.

== Southeast Asia ==
=== Philippines ===
- Manila Bay, Manila, Philippines
- Lamon Bay, Quezon Province, Philippines

India

- Marine Drive, Mumbai
