= Montaza =

District and park in Alexandria, Egypt

Coordinates: 31.28°N 30.02°E

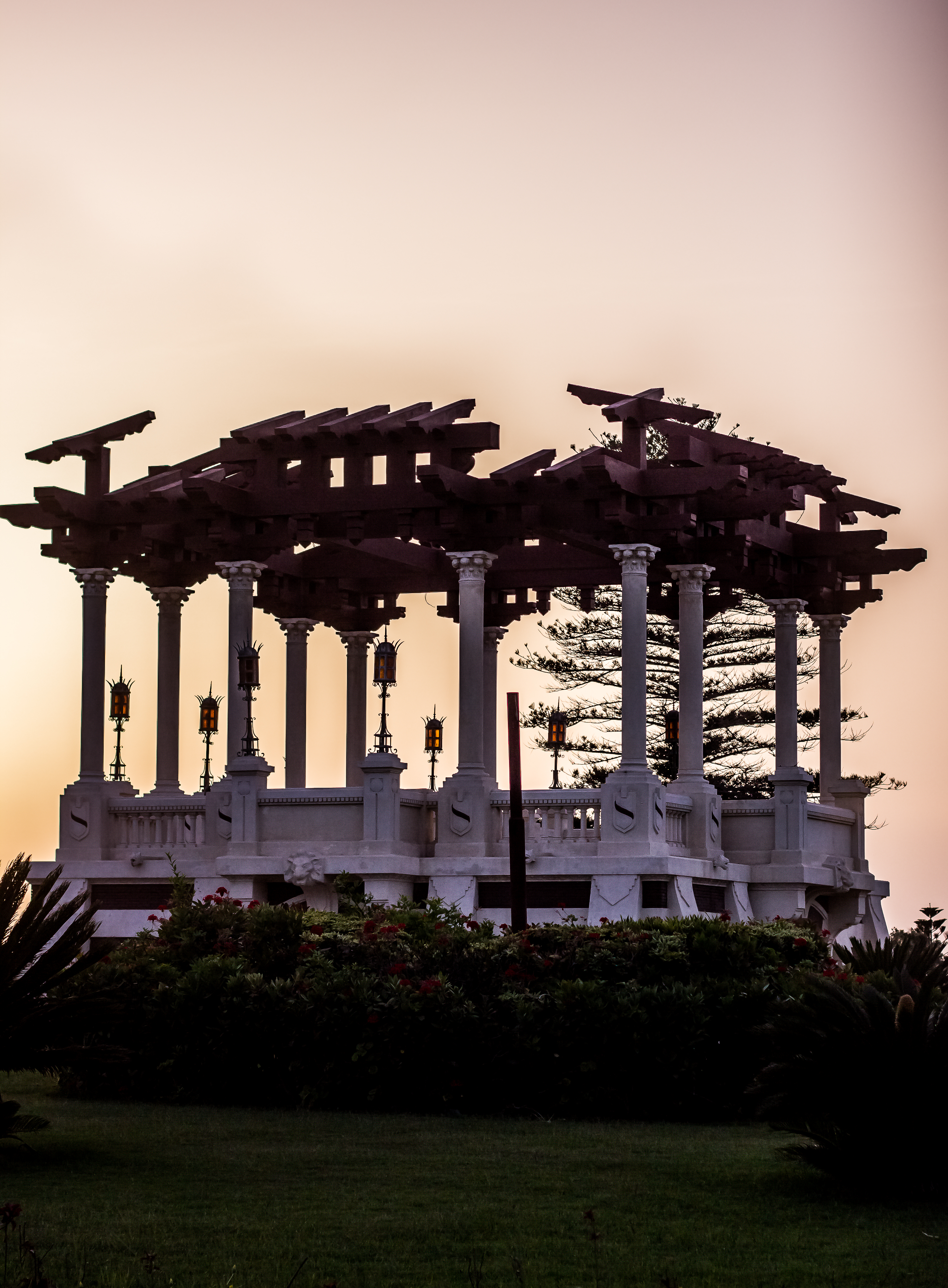
Near Montaza Palace

Montaza (Egyptian Arabic: المنتزه) is the name of both a district and a park in Alexandria, Egypt. The district includes the park, but the two are legally distinct.

== Etymology ==
"Montaza" does mean "park", but like most words in Arabic there is an essence that is missing by literal English translation. It can only be understood with a greater awareness of the root: "nuzha" (Arabic: نزهة). This means variably - to be far, untouched, unblemished, and free. Thus "montaza" takes meanings such as promenade, walk, stroll; recreation ground; park.

== Montaza district ==
The Montaza district (Arabic: حي المنتزه Ḥayy al-Muntazah) is a local government district of Alexandria Governorate on the northeastern end of the city along the coast. Besides the neighborhood-sized park of Montaza which gives it its name, Montaza district includes the neighborhoods of Soyof, El Falaky, El Mandara, Sidi Bishr, Maamora, Khurshid, Abu Qir and parts of Asafra. With a population of approximately 1.2 million, the Montaza district is the largest district of the governorate by population.

The Montaza district administrative building is in Sidi Bishr, at the intersection of Masgid Sidi Bishr and Malak Hefni Streets, near the Sidi Bishr tram station. The building was damaged by fire during the Egyptian Revolution of 2011; the building had contained a police station, which, like police stations across Egypt, was a particular target for protesters.

== Montaza Park ==
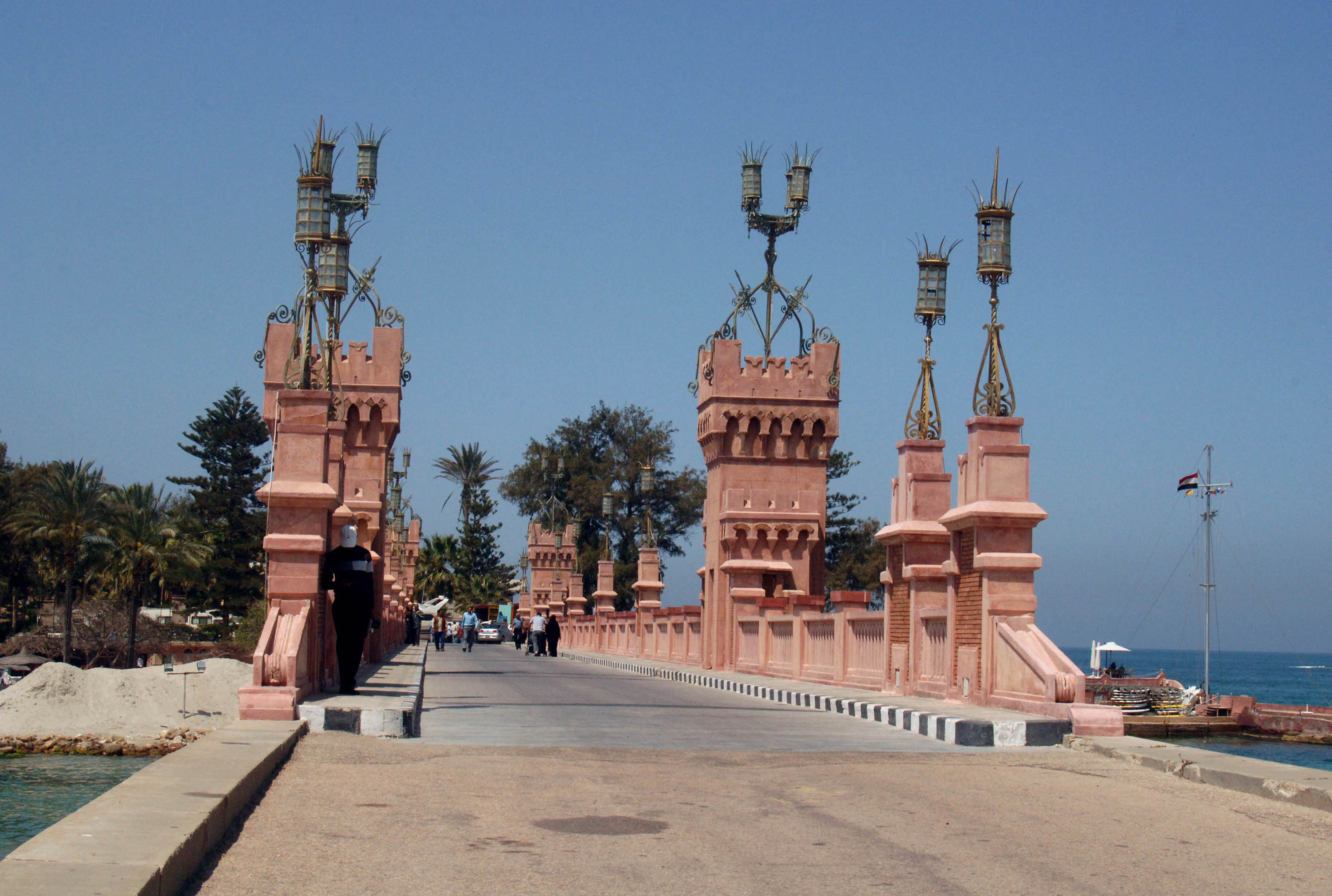
Bridge in the Montaza Gardens

The neighborhood of Montaza is at the far northeast end of Montaza District, along the coast. Built under the monarchy, it is a favored tourist spot on account of its sizable gardens and palaces left by its royal heritage; the Egyptian government charges a nominal fee (E£25 as of 2018). Montaza Palace, which gives the park its name, was constructed during the reign of the Khedive Abbas II, the royal family's habit of summering in the palace eventually drew wealthy Egyptians and foreigners to the same location (although foreigners in general tended to congregate at the opposite end of the city, in Agami). It is considered to be quite exclusive to be in possession of a cabin in the Montaza. It can not be bought and is usually passed down from generation to generation. There are several different "suburbs" within the Montaza, the most exclusive being Aida.

Montaza also plays host to a noted clock tower and two old hotels (the Helnan Palestine and Salamlek Palace). The Sheraton Montazah is actually across the street from the park, in the neighborhood of Mandara.

== See also ==
- Neighborhoods in Alexandria
