= El Mandara =

El Mandara/Al Mandarah المندرة
- Location in Egypt
- Coordinates: 31.285519°N 30.021758°E
- Country: Egypt
- Governorate: Alexandria
- City: Alexandria
- Time zone: UTC+2 (EET)
  - Summer (DST): UTC+3 (EEST)

El Mandara or Al Mandarah (Arabic: المندرة) is a neighborhood in Alexandria, Egypt.

== Ancient site ==
The modern neighborhood of El Mandarah is identified with the ancient town of Taposiris or Chersonesus Parva, which was mentioned by the ancient writers Strabo and Ptolemy. The ancient Greek geographer Strabo wrote that young people of Alexandria would celebrate feasts in the neighborhood. There are few remains of the ancient town today.

== Famous Places in Mandarah ==
- Al Montazah Garden
- Montaza Palace
- Al Haramlek Palace
- Al Salamek Palace
- Hay Al Montazah Than (Famous Square)
- The Mandarah Pearl Statue
- The Gatekeeping Lions of Mandarah
- Souk Al Mandarah (Market place located in Malak Hefni Qebli Street)
- Mandarah Al Game3 (Small local mosque)
- Al Fanara (Roundabout near Mandarah Al Game3)
- The Tourist Bus Station (Near the main entrance of the Montazah Garden

"*" Meaning located in Montazah Garden

== See also ==
- Neighborhoods in Alexandria
