= Victoria (neighborhood) =

Victoria فكتوريا
- Location in Egypt
- Coordinates: 31.248617°N 29.969745°E
- Country: Egypt
- Governorate: Alexandria
- City: Alexandria
- Time zone: UTC+2 (EET)
  - Summer (DST): UTC+3 (EEST)

Victoria (Arabic: فكتوريا Viktoria) is a neighborhood in Alexandria, Egypt, named after Queen Victoria. It serves as a transportation hub for eastern Alexandria, containing the easternmost station of line 1 and 2 of the Alexandria tramways, with bus lines and mashrū` routes operating from near the terminal.

Victoria hosts the prestigious Victoria College, a private, secular secondary school originally styled after British public schools.

== See also ==
- Neighborhoods in Alexandria
