= Cleopatra (neighborhood) =

Cleopatra كليوباترا
- Neighborhood
- Location in Egypt
- Coordinates: 31.218454°N 29.936621°E
- Country: Egypt
- Governorate: Alexandria
- Time zone: UTC+2 (EET)
  - Summer (DST): UTC+3 (EEST)
- Postal code: 21618

Cleopatra (Egyptian Arabic: كليوباترا) is a neighborhood in Alexandria, Egypt. It is known for the Cleopatra Beach, a popular public beach, and contains the Cleopatra Hammamat Tram Station. It is located in the East District of Alexandria Governorate.

== See also ==
- Neighborhoods in Alexandria
