= El Soyof =

El Soyof السيوف
- Location in Egypt
- Coordinates: 31.235702°N 29.998999°E
- Country: Egypt
- Governorate: Alexandria
- Time zone: UTC+2 (EET)
  - Summer (DST): UTC+3 (EEST)

El Seouf (Arabic: السيوف) is a neighborhood in Alexandria, Egypt.

== See also ==
- Neighborhoods in Alexandria
