= Montaza Palace =

Palace and museum in Alexandria, Egypt

Coordinates: 31.2886°N 30.0159°E

- قصر المنتزه
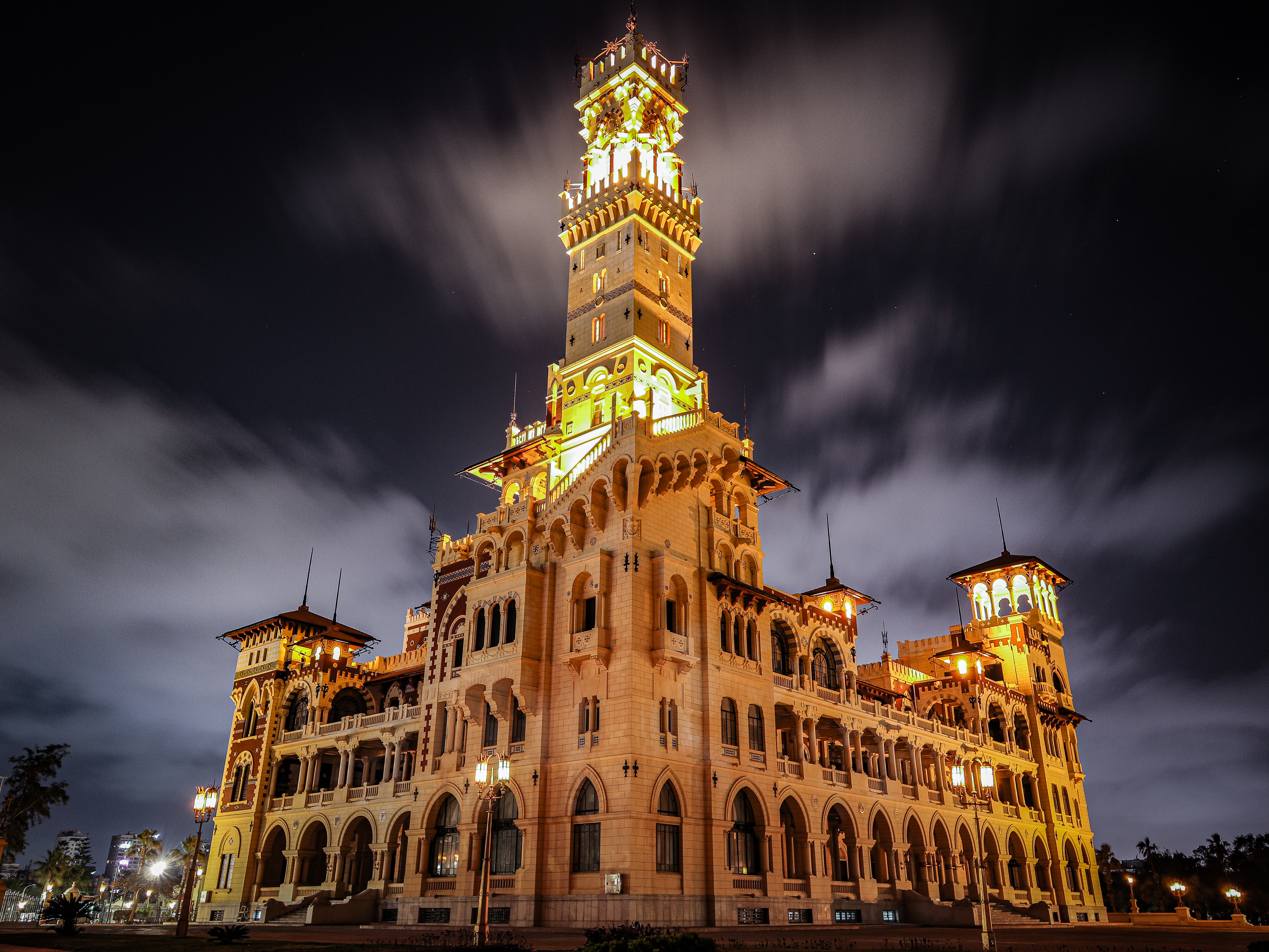
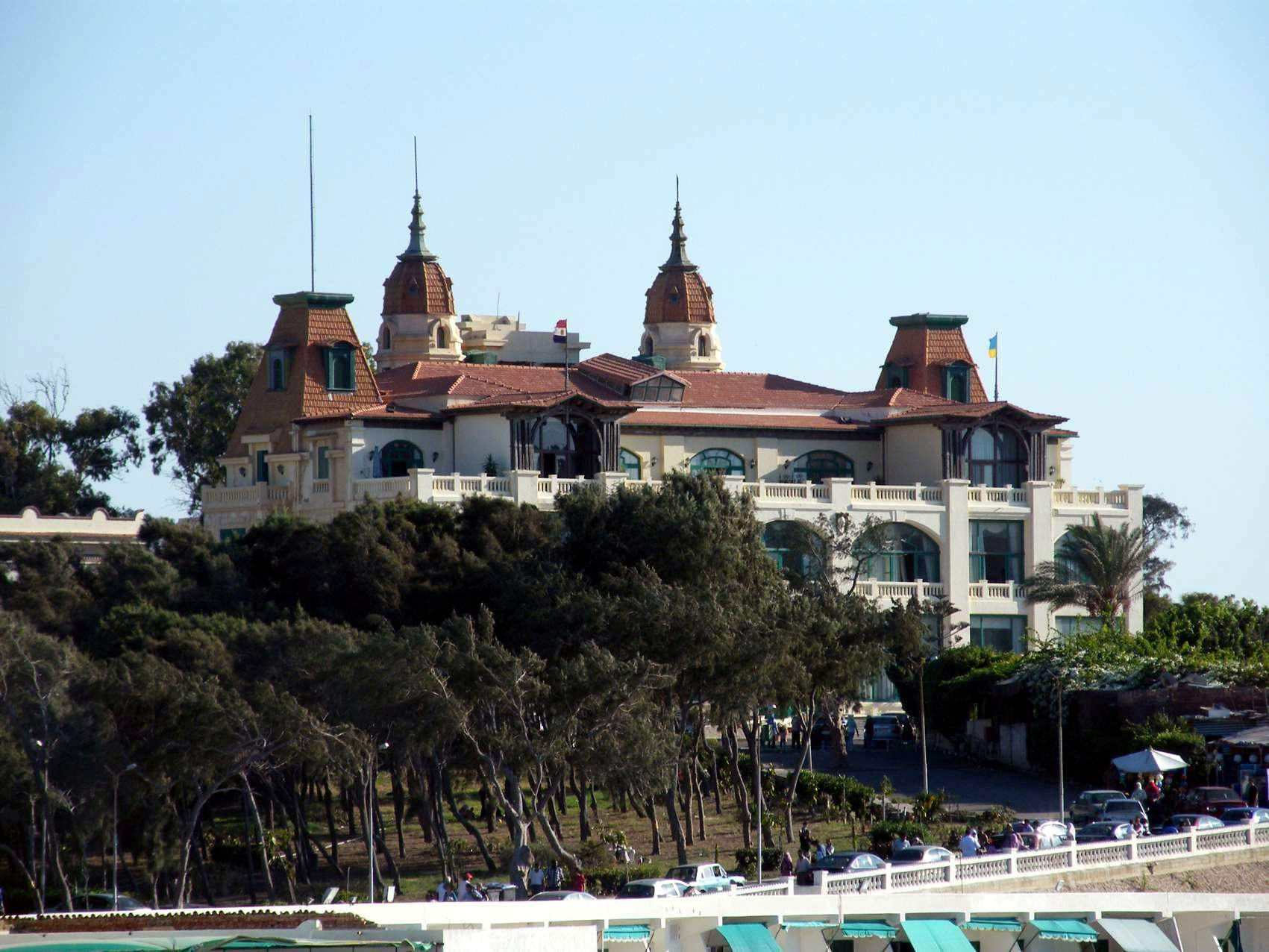
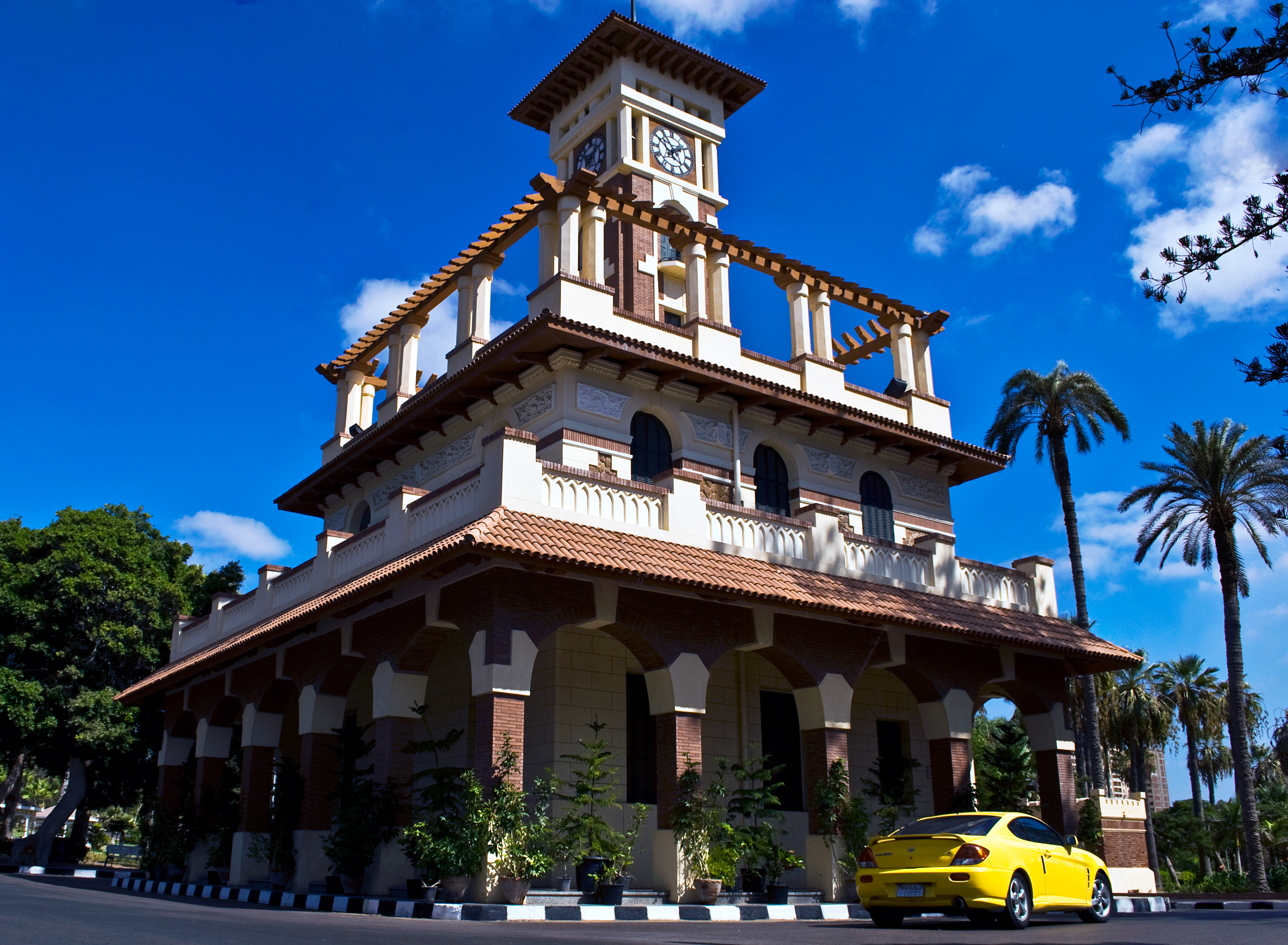
- Haramlek Palace (left), Salamlek Palace (right), clock tower

- Location within Egypt

General information
- Type: Palace
- Architectural style: Italian Renaissance
- Location: Alexandria, Egypt
- Current tenants: President of Egypt
- Completed: 1892
- Client: Abbas II
- Owner: Egyptian Government

Design and construction
- Architect: Hassan pasha El-Adawi

Montaza Palace (Arabic: قصر المنتزه) (Asr el Montaza) is a palace, museum and extensive gardens in the Montaza district of Alexandria, Egypt. It was built on a low plateau east of central Alexandria overlooking a beach on the Mediterranean Sea.

== History ==
The extensive Montaza Palace grounds first had the Salamlek Palace, built in 1892 by Khedive Abbas II, the last Muhammad Ali Dynasty ruler to hold the Khedive title over the Khedivate of Egypt and Sudan. It was used as a hunting lodge and residence for his companion.

The larger El-Haramlek Palace and royal gardens were added to the Montaza Palace grounds, being built by King Fuad I in 1932, as a summer palace. It is in a mixture of Ottoman and Florentine styles, with two towers. One of these towers rises distinctively high above with elaborated Italian Renaissance design details. The palace has long open arcades facing the sea along each floor.

President Anwar El-Sadat renovated the original Salamlek Palace as an official presidential residence. It was most recently used by former president Hosni Mubarak.

== Public access ==
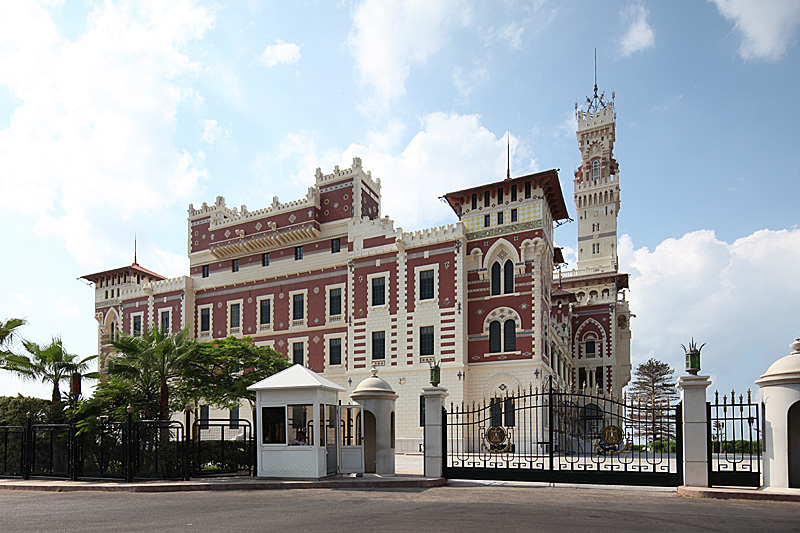
View of Montaza Palace

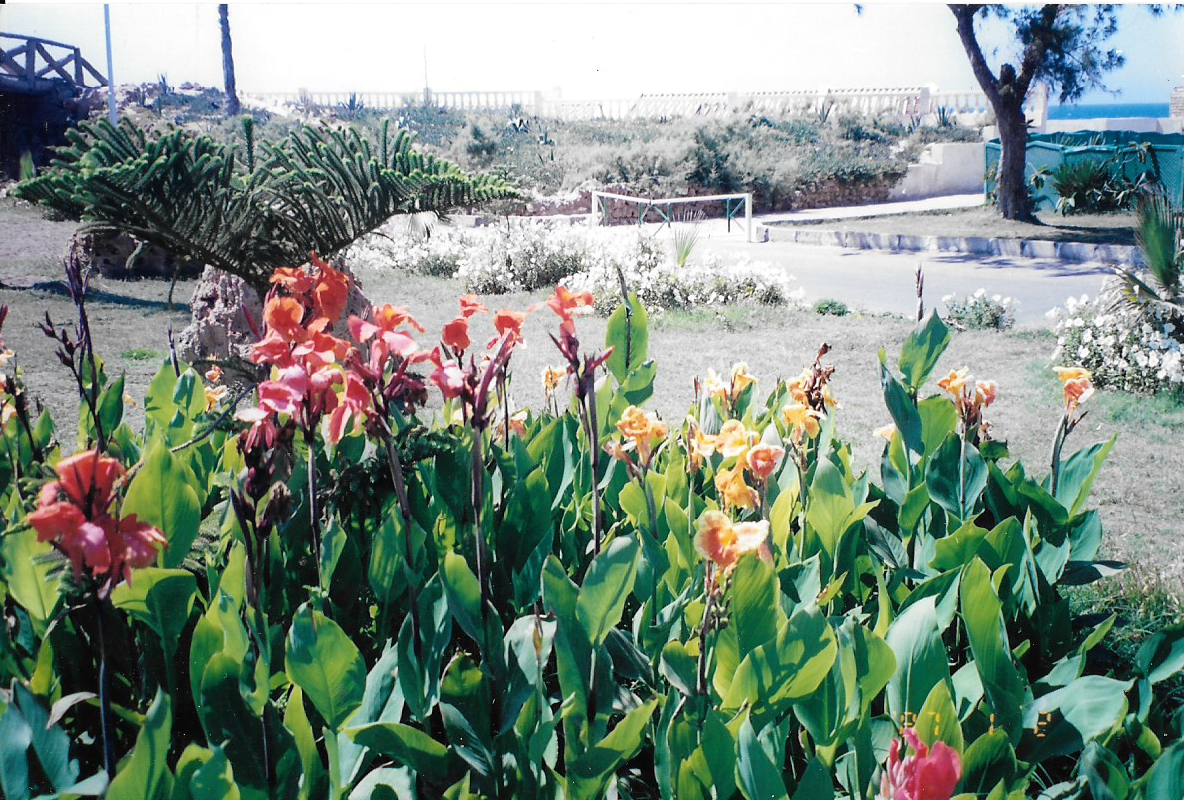
Flowers at the Royal Gardens at Montaza Palace

El-Montaza Park, the former expansive royal gardens of 300 acres (120 ha), are open as a public landscape park and forest reserve.

El-Haramlek—Montaza Palace is a public museum of the Muhammad Ali Dynasty family history and objects d'art. El Salamlek Palace is now an adjacent hotel.

== See also ==
- Ras El Tin Palace
- Royal Jewelry Museum – Fatma Al-Zahra Palace
