= Stanley (neighborhood) =

Stanley ستانلى Stanli
- Neighborhood
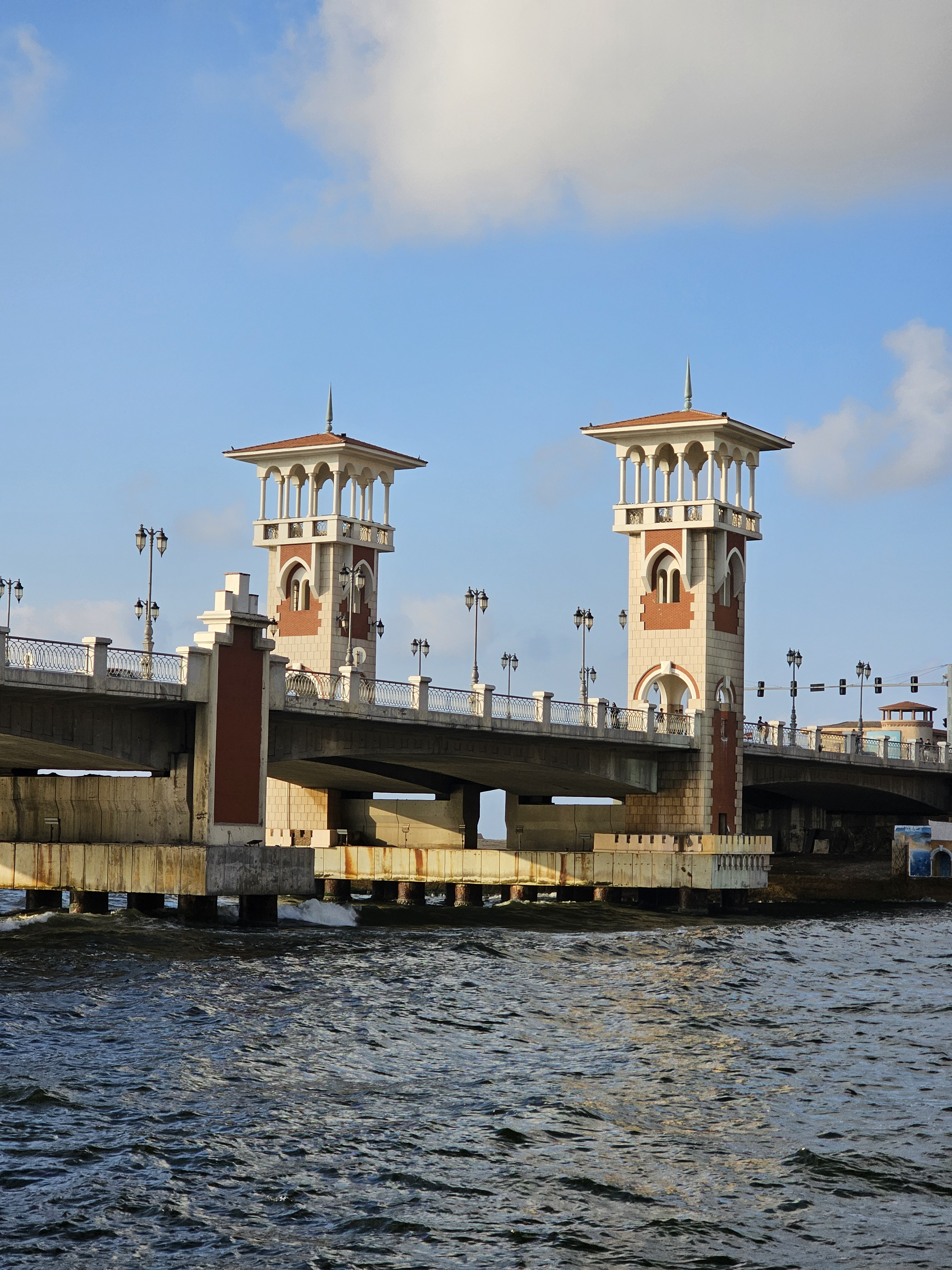
- Stanley Bridge

- Location in Egypt
- Coordinates: 31.234307°N 29.946485°E
- Country: Egypt
- Governorate: Alexandria
- City: Alexandria
- Time zone: UTC+2 (EST)
  - Summer (DST): UTC+3 (EST)

Stanley (Egyptian Arabic: ستانلى) is a neighborhood near the city centre of Alexandria. The area is known for its iconic Stanley Bridge on the Alexandria Corniche, as well as its private-access beach. The bridge has a total length of 400 meters with 6 spans.

== Gallery ==
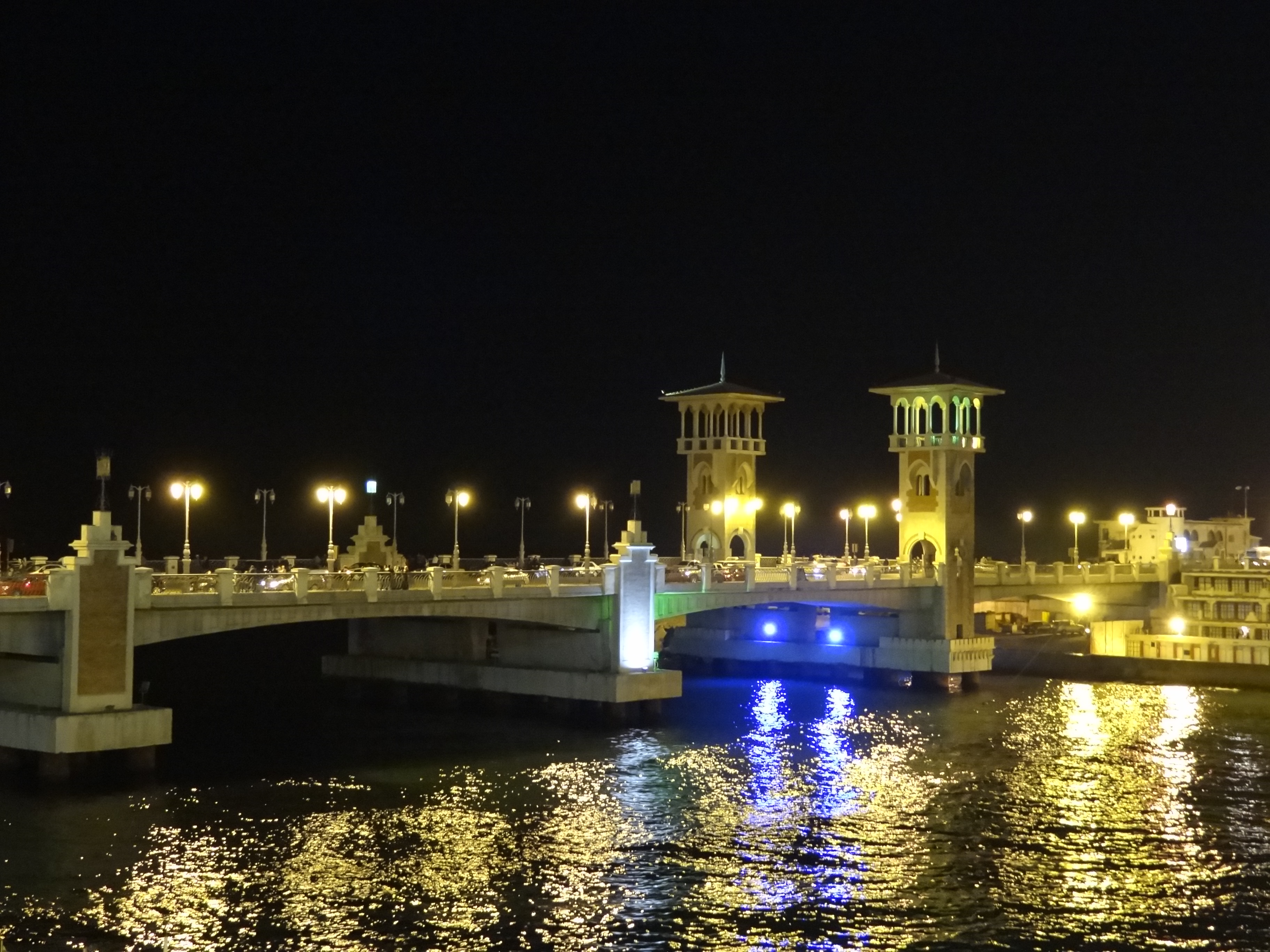
View of Stanley Bridge at night

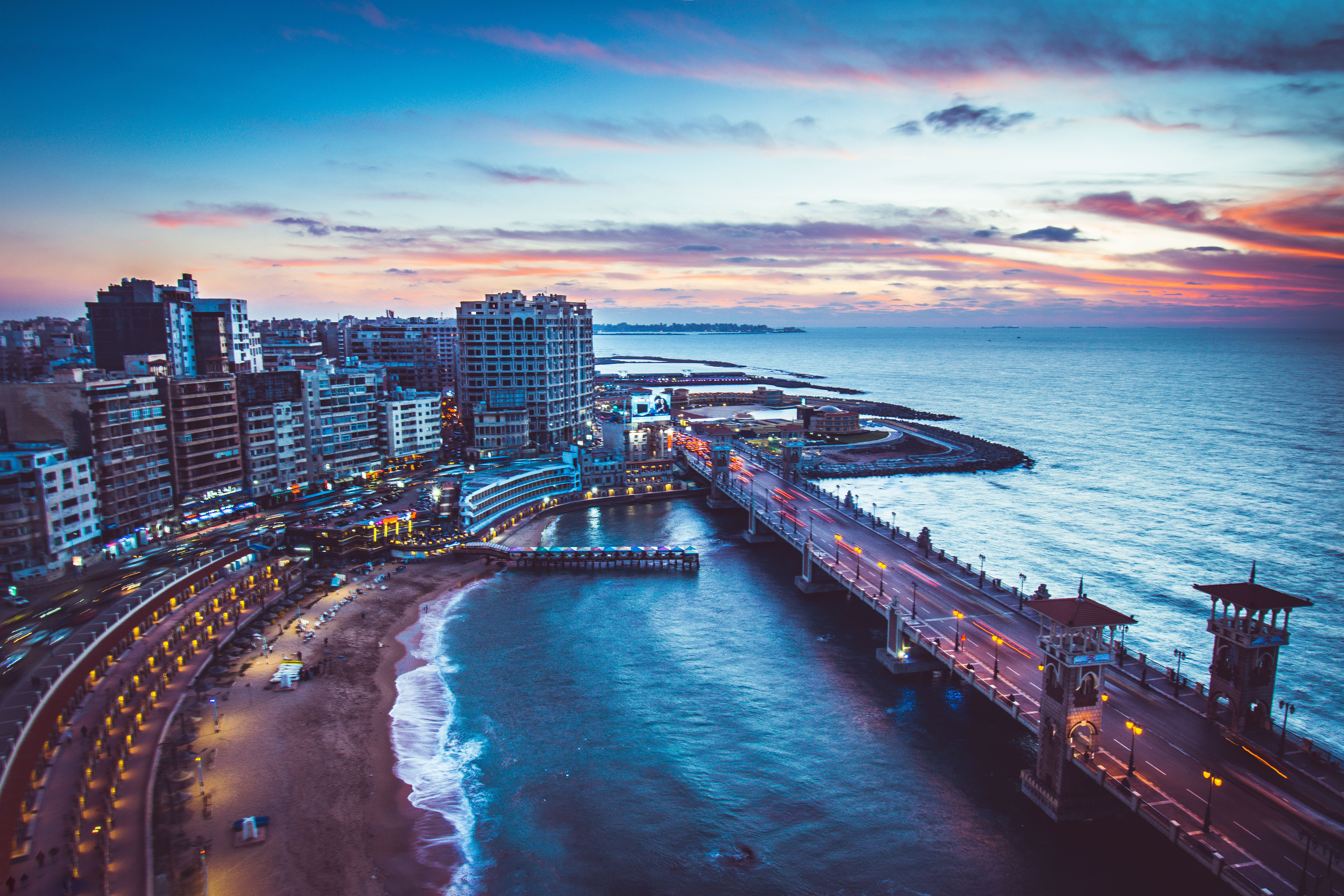
Aerial view of Stanley

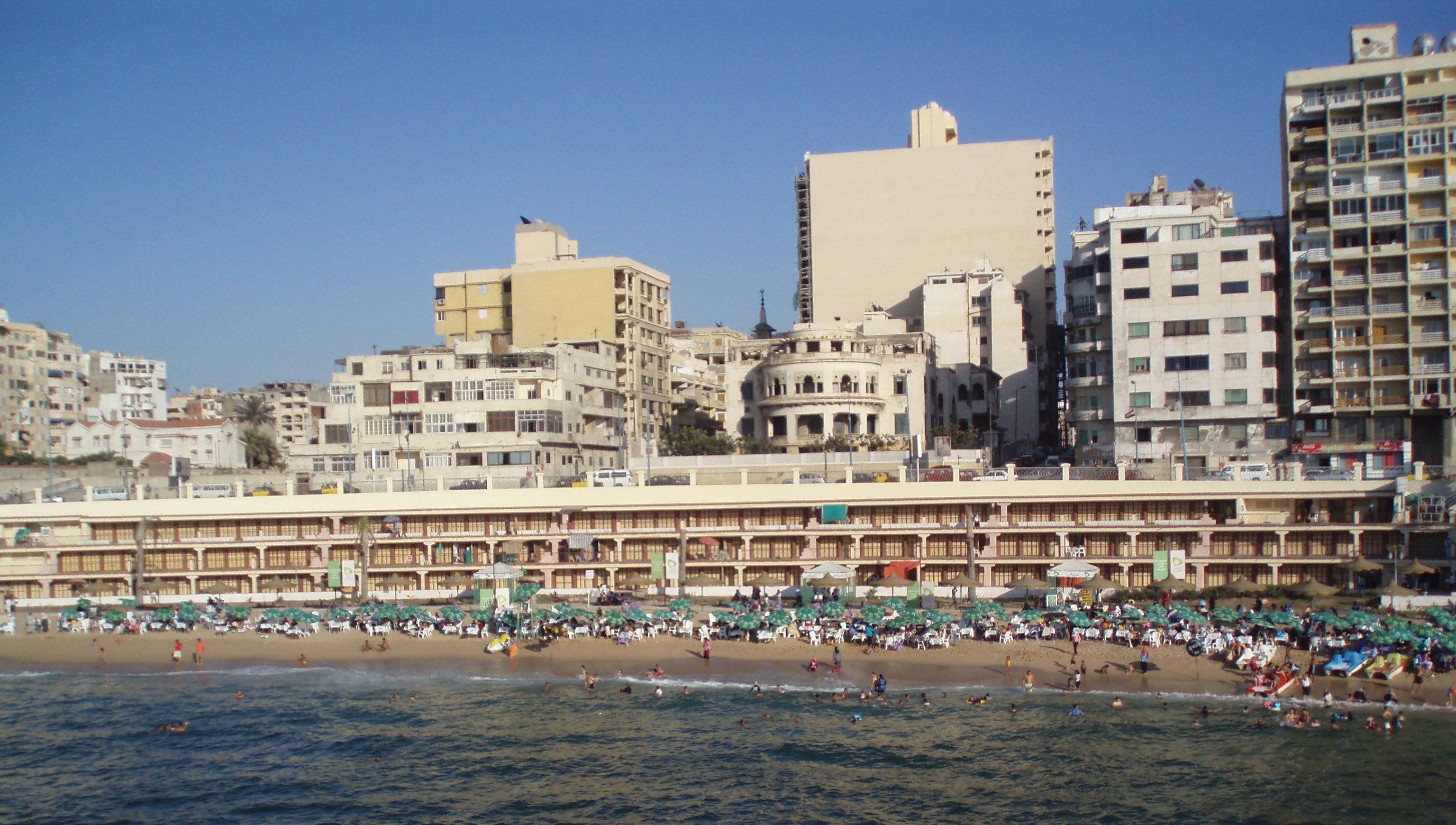
Stanley Beach seen from the bridge

== See also ==
- Neighborhoods in Alexandria
