= Trams in Alexandria =

Tramway network in Alexandria, Egypt

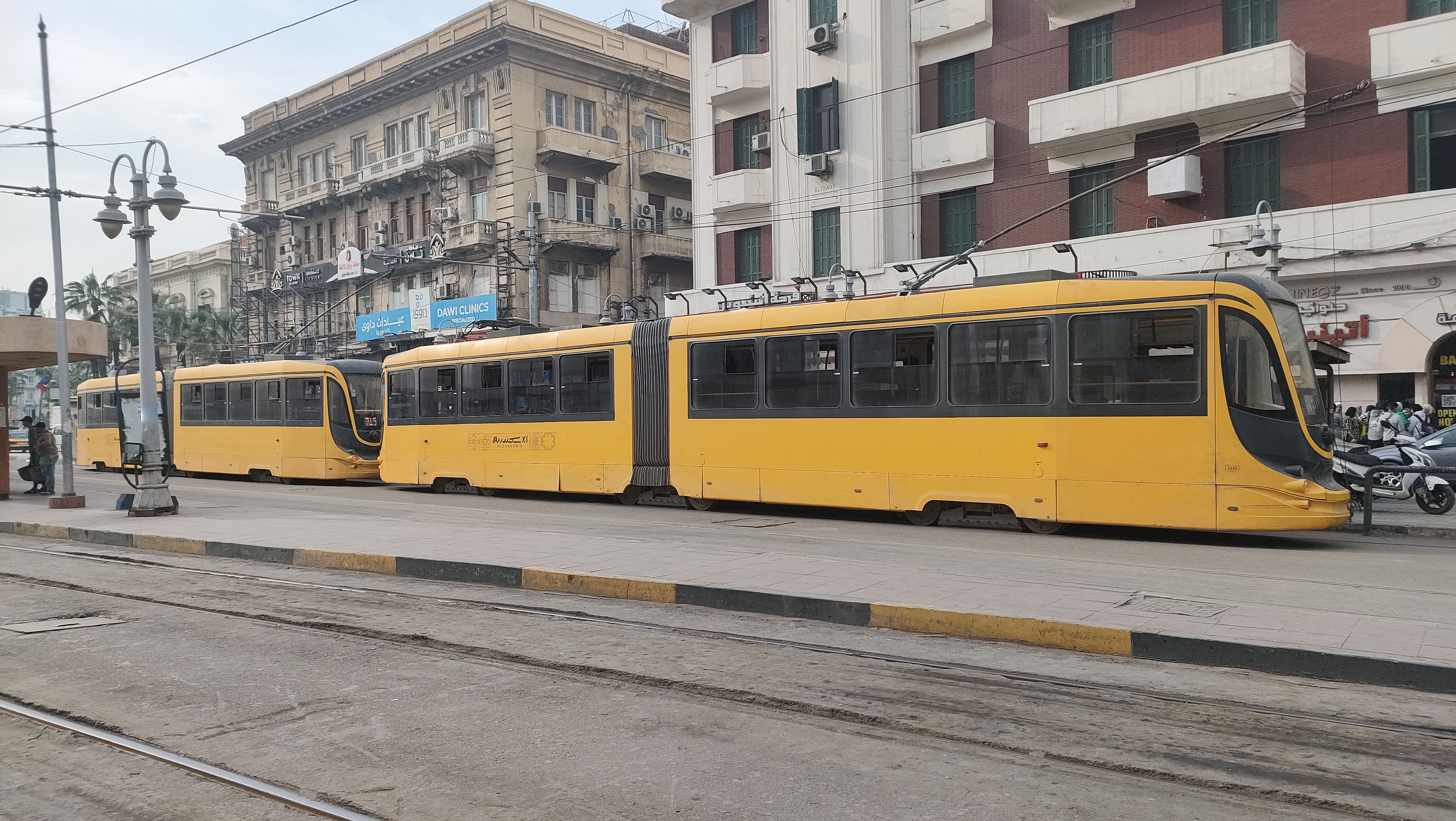
- Alexandria tram

Overview
- Locale: Alexandria, Egypt
- Transit type: Tram
- Number of lines: 20
- Number of stations: 140

Operation
- Began operation: 1863
- Operation will start: 2027-2028
- Ended operation: April 1st, 2026

Technical
- System length: 32 km (20 mi)
- Track gauge: 1,435 mm (4 ft 8 1/2 in) standard gauge
System map
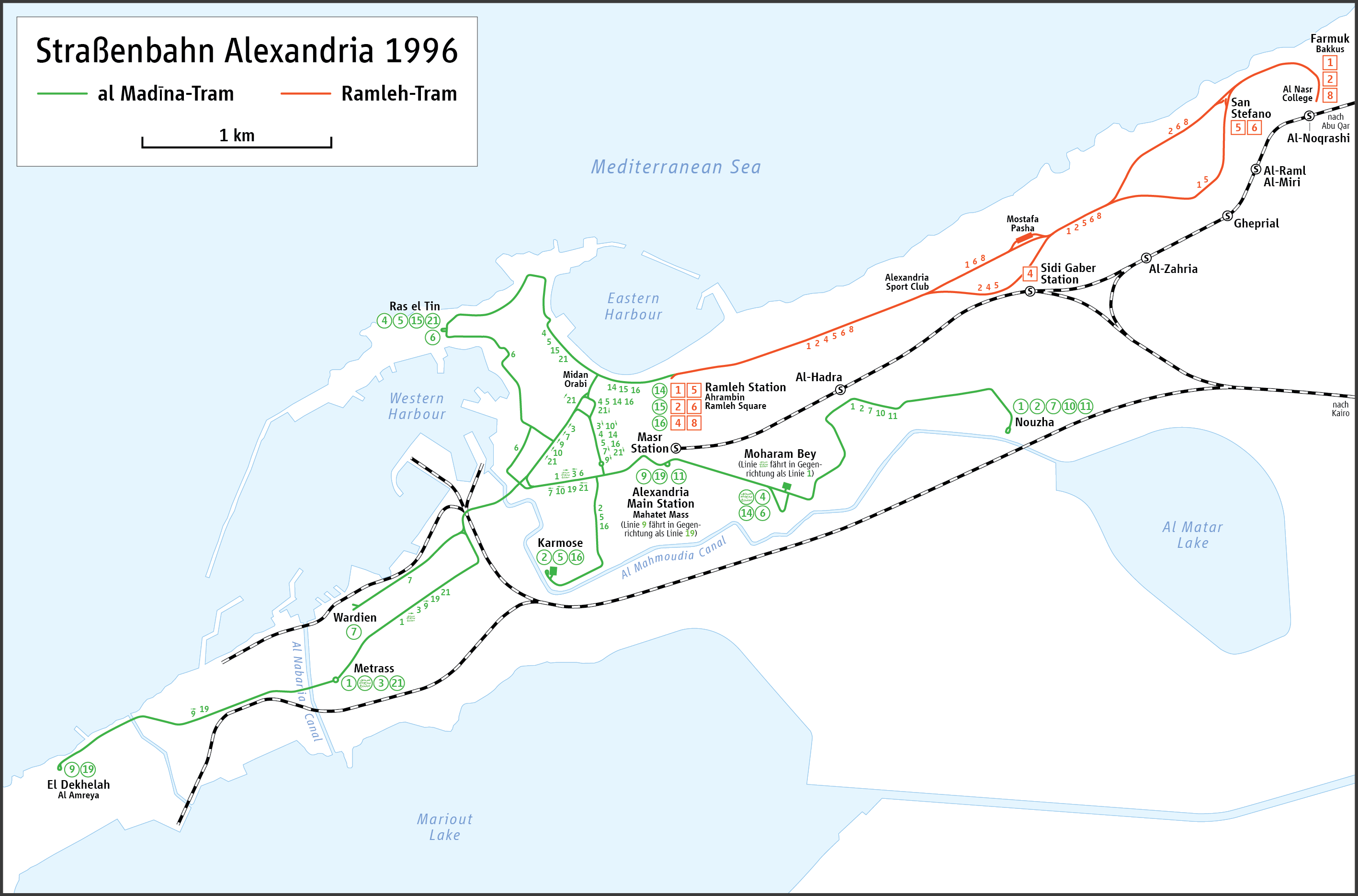
Alexandria tramway routes

The Alexandria tramway network served the city of Alexandria, Egypt. It began operating in 1863 and it used to consist of 20 lines operated and ran across 32 kilometers (20 mi) of the track, serving 140 stops. It used to be one of the few tram systems in the world that uses double-deck cars; other examples are Blackpool in the UK and Hong Kong. The system was a 1,435 mm (4 ft 8 1/2 in) standard gauge. As of April 1st, 2026 the tram system has been dismantled and operation has ceased, as the government of Alexandria are rebuilding and creating a Metro-Tram system replacing the old tram system.

== History ==
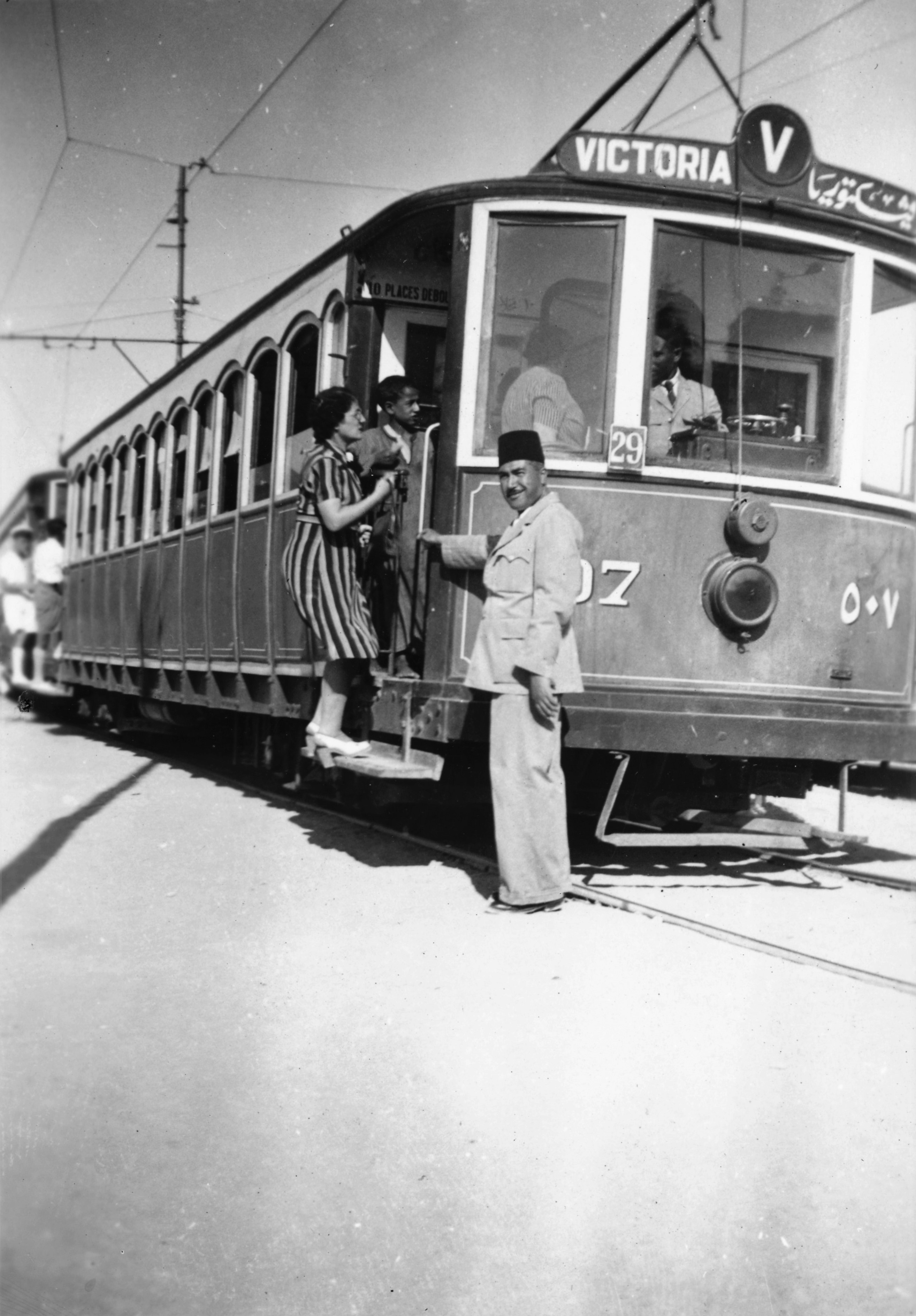
Alexandria tram in the 1940s

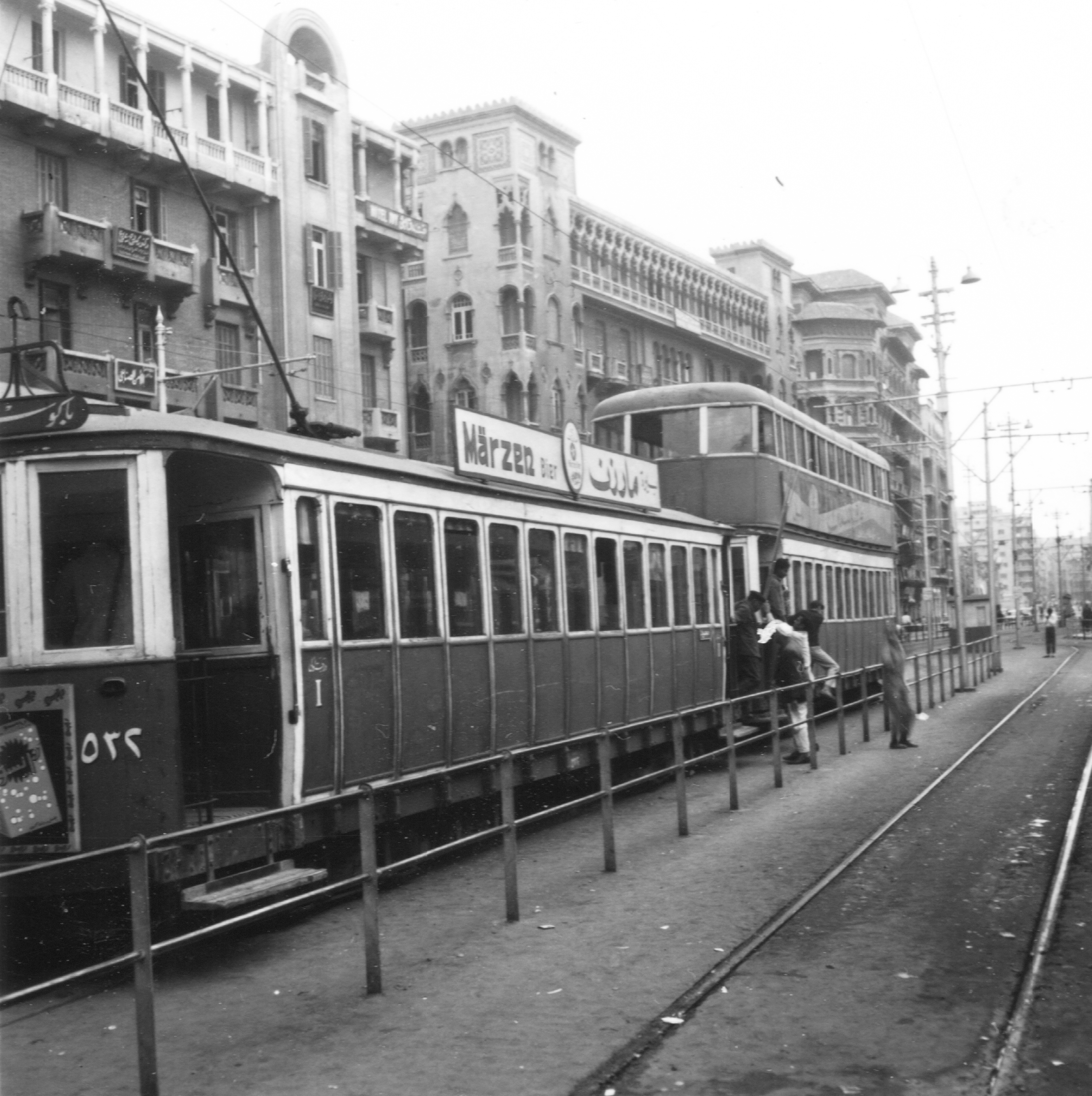
Alexandria tram in 1969

The license to build a tramway system was issued on 16 August 1860, and the first line of the network began operating in on 8 January 1863. The system was electrified in 1902. In addition to the Al Raml line, there is an extensive network of tram lines running in the streets of central and western Alexandria.

A small museum about the trams was opened at Raml station in 2017.

== Cultural Significance ==
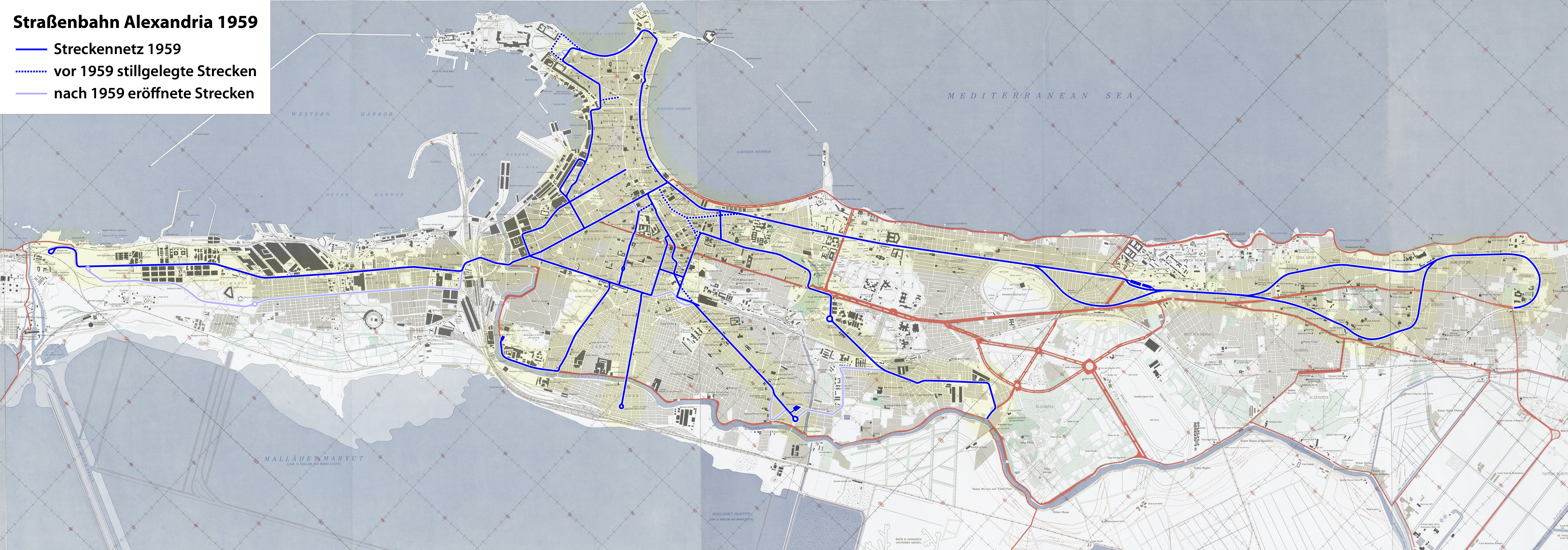
Tram network 1959

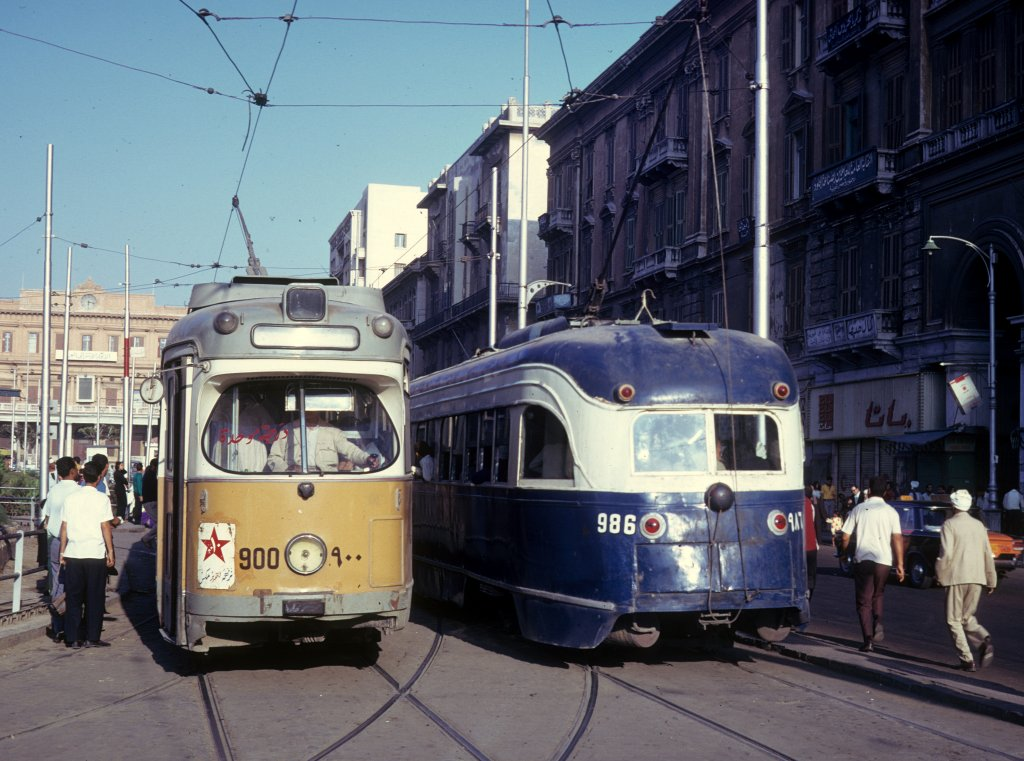
Alexandria tram in 1974

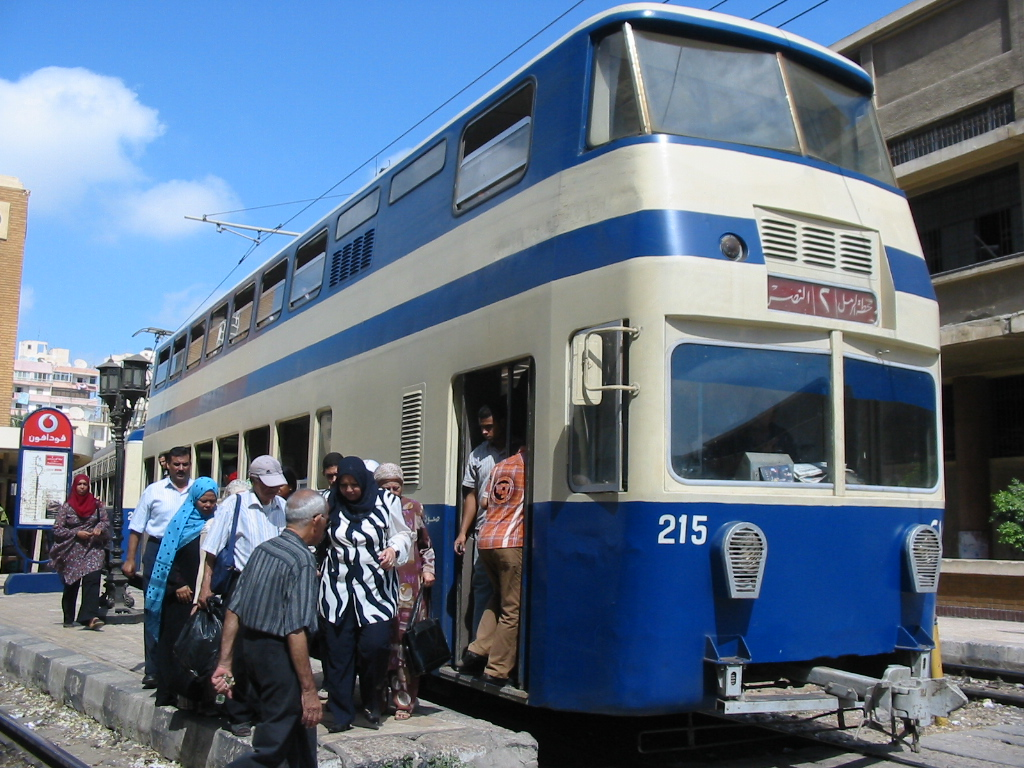
One of the small number of double-deck cars (from Kinki Sharyo) in Alexandria's fleet. All six are non-motorised control trailers, photo taken in 2008.

Besides its functional role as a main mode of public transportation, the Alexandria tramway has become one of the most iconic symbols of the city to locals and tourists alike. It has distinctive yellow & white, or blue & white cars are closely associated with Alexandria’s identity and are frequently featured in local art and photography. For many residents, the tramway is a representation of a combination of nostalgia and everyday life, being nicknamed the "heart of Alexandria" by many.

== Fare ==
As of 2025, the price of a single tram ride depends on the standard of the tramcar. If the tram does not have curtains (usually the last carriage), the price is £E2. For a carriage with curtains, the price is £E5. A special "Tram Café" was inaugurated in 2015, on which a fare of £E5 was charged before its discontinuation the same year

== Fleet ==
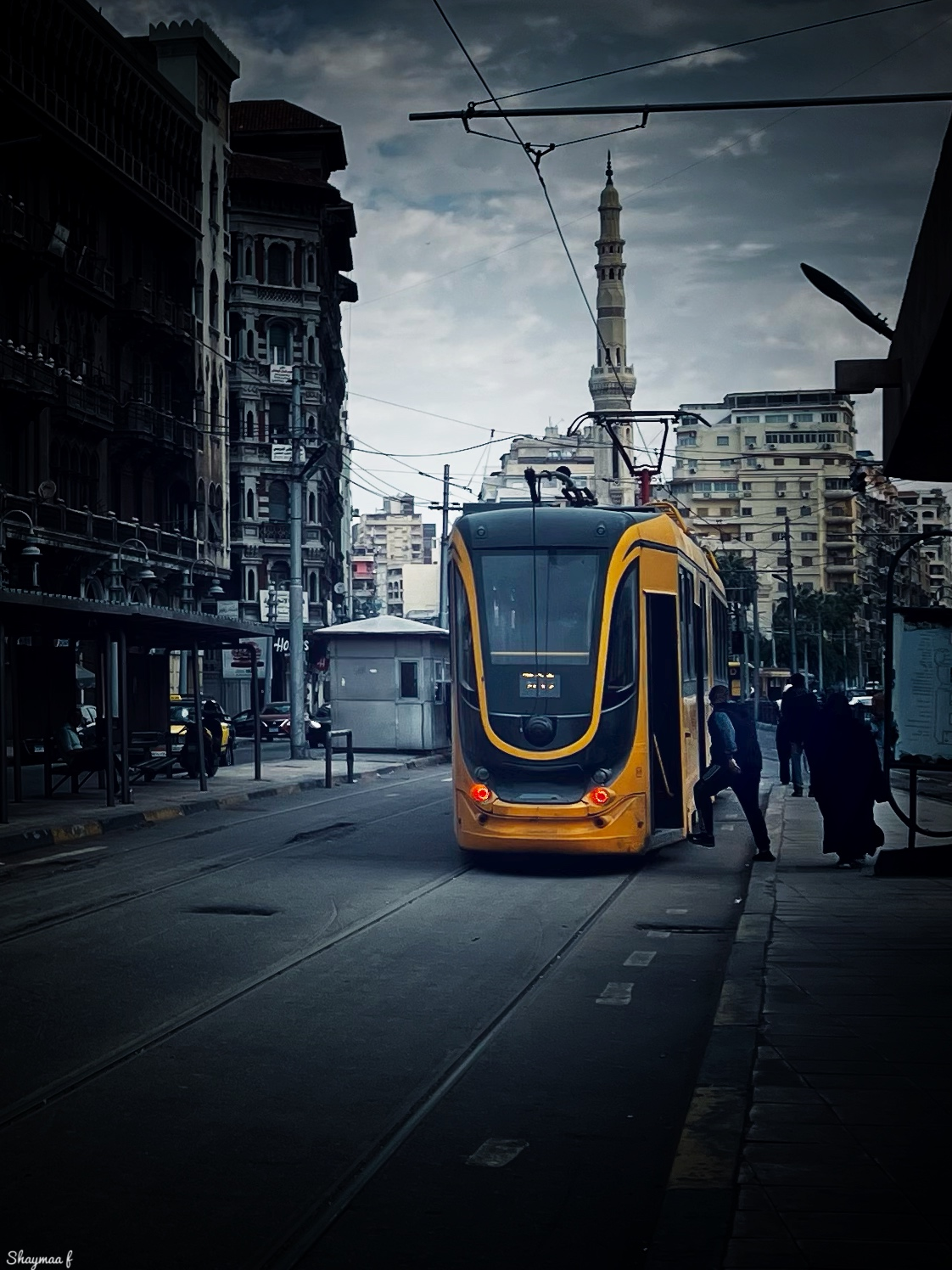
New Alexandria Tram

Current cars in use:

- Japan Kinki Sharyo/Fuji Heavy Industries 1982 (28 cars from 2 orders)
- Japan Kinki Sharyo 1975-1995 (25 cars with 6 double-decker cars)
- Hungary Ganz-Mavag EMU 1985-86 (29 cars)
- Egypt SEMAF (ARE) 2009 (3 cars - designed by Kinki Sharyo)
- Ukraine K-1E6 (15 cars from 15 orders)

=== Works cars ===
- Austria Plasser & Theurer 1990s (1 work car - track tamper)
- Poland NEWAG Oberhausen 2005 (1 work car) and 1997 (1 work car)

=== Retired or in storage ===
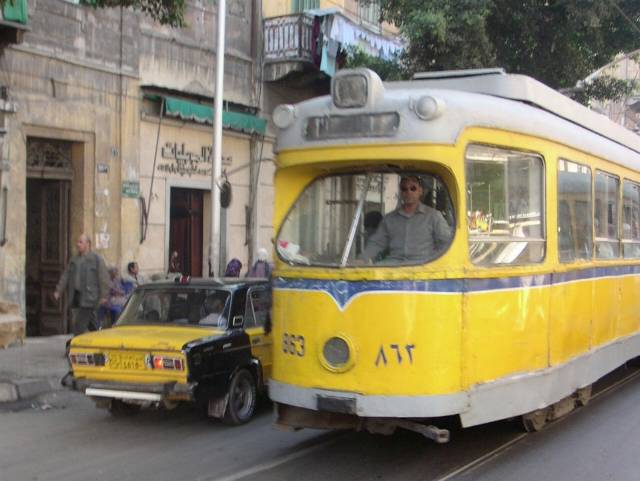
An Al Madina line Duewag GT-series tram

- Switzerland - Maschinenfabrik Oerlikon 1925 (1 work car and now museum piece)
- Germany - Duewag GT-6 1960-66 (97 cars- second hand from Copenhagen Tramways and mostly retired)
- Former Czechoslovakia - ČKD Several second-hand KT4D from Potsdam and Berlin Tramways, built by the former Czechoslovak manufacturer Tatra and acquired in 2015. These vehicles are not yet in use by 2017.
- Canada/United States - Canadian Car and Foundry/St. Louis Car Company PCC - Alexandria acquired 140 used Toronto PCC streetcars in 1968, but all retired in 1984.

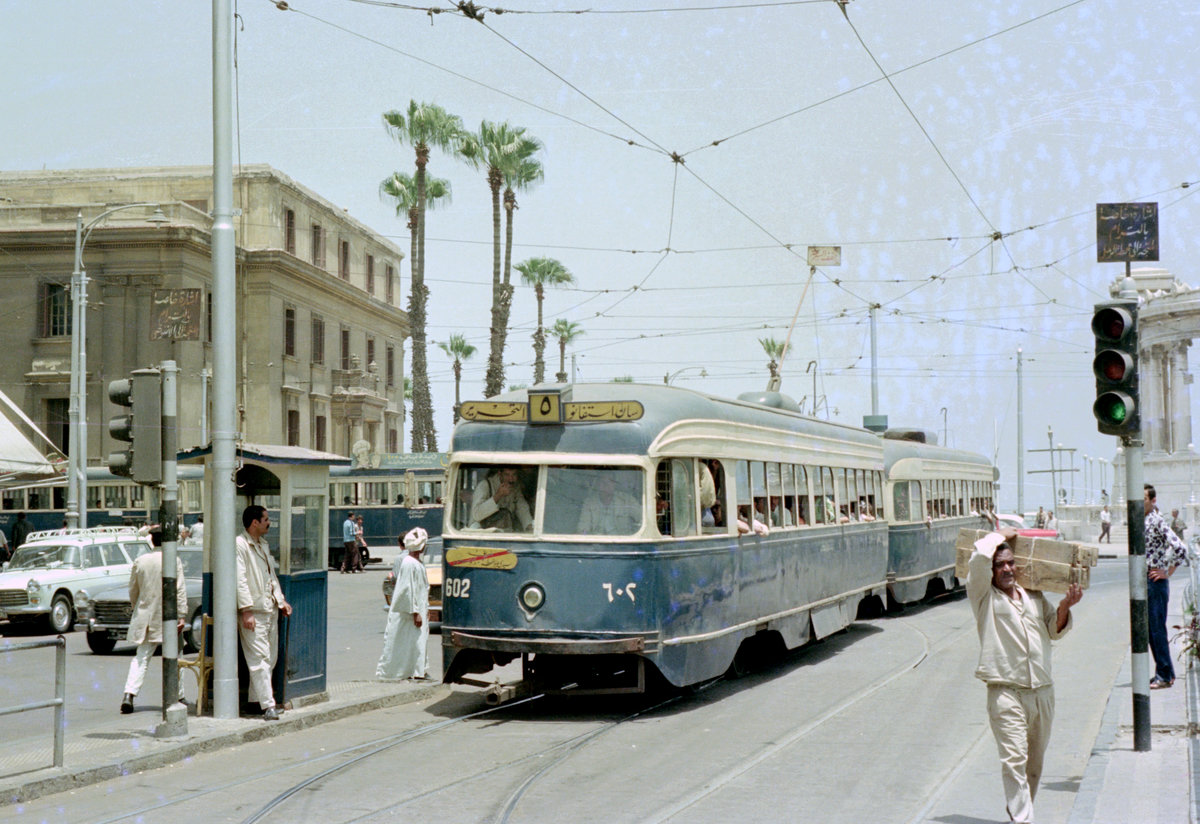
A PCC tram in 1970's

Source: Cairo and Alexandria Tram fleet

== Tram lines ==
The tram transportation system in Alexandria consists of two systems:

=== Tram Al Ramlh ===
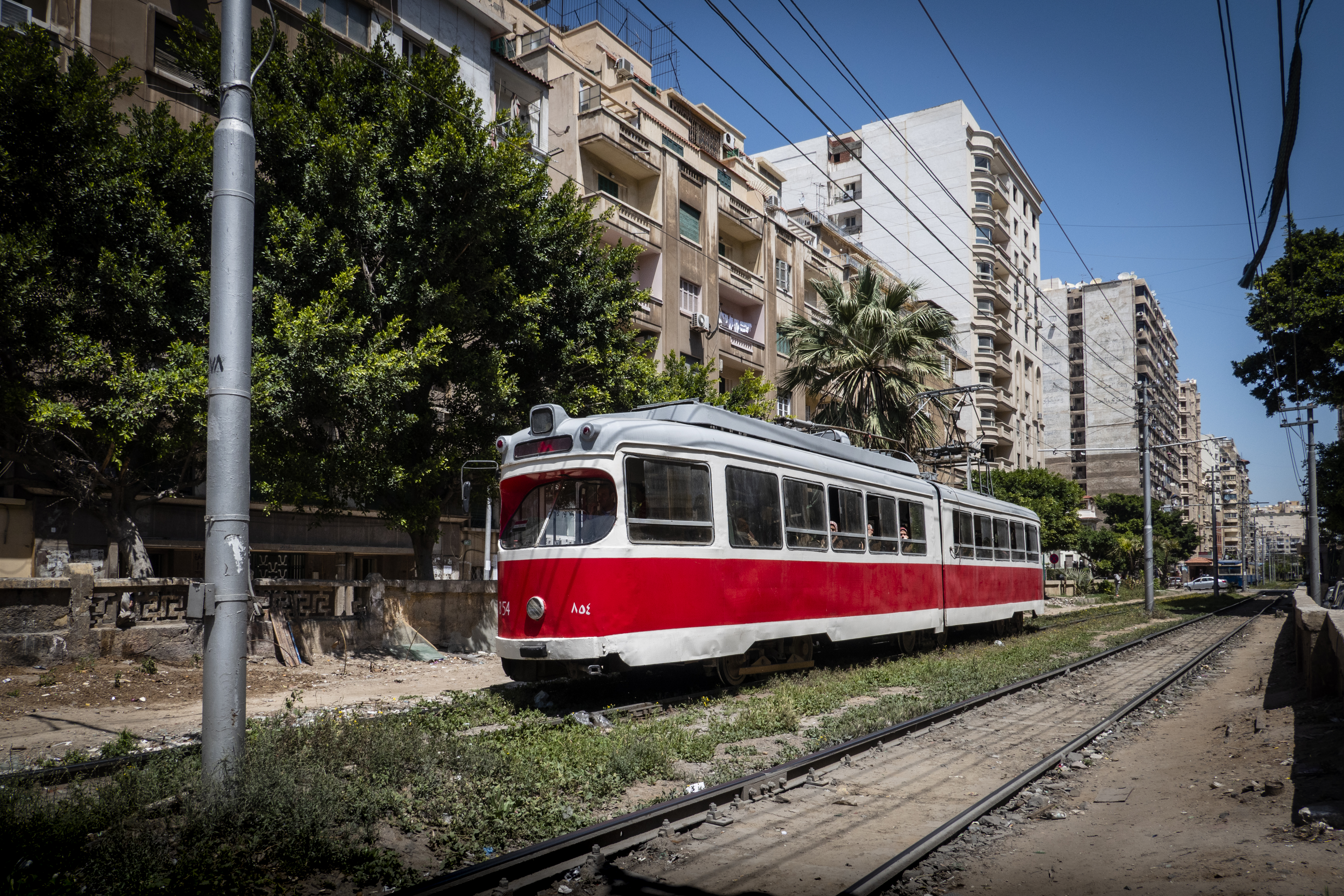
Roushdy station

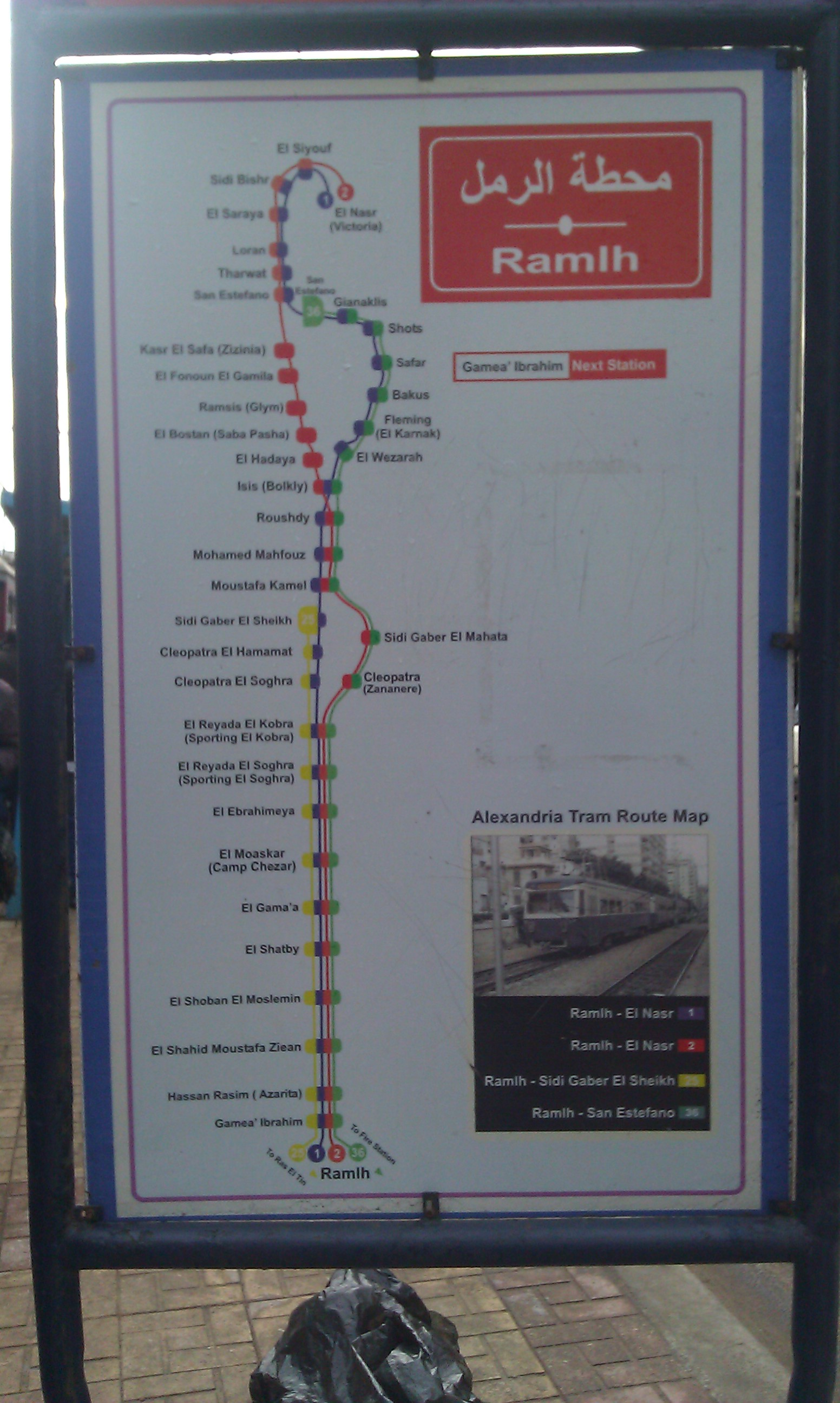
Alexandria tram map at Ramlh terminus - Nov 2011

Al Ramlh trams cars are characterized by their blue and cream livery.

Route 1 serves the following stations: (Note: Spelling of names are from Alexandria Passenger Transporting Authority route boards displayed at each station. One side is in English the other in Arabic.)

1. Al Nasr (Victoria)
2. Al Seyouf
3. Sidi Beshr
4. Al Saraya
5. Laurent Louran
6. Tharwat
7. San Stefano
8. Gianaclis
9. Schutz (Shods)
10. Safar
11. Abou Shabana aka Baccos
12. Al Karnak
13. Al Wezara (The Ministry)
14. Isis Bolkly (Bulkeley)
15. Roushdy
16. Mohammed Mahfouz
17. Mustafa Kamil
18. Sidi Gaber Al Sheikh (Bus & Railway Station)
19. Cleopatra Hammamat (Cleopatra Baths)
20. Cleopatra Al Soghra
21. Al Reyada Al Kobra (Sporting Al Kobra)
22. Al Reyada Al Soghra (Sporting Al Soghra)
23. Al Ibrahimiyya
24. Al Moaskar (Camp Caesar)
25. Al Gamaa (The University)
26. Al Shatby
27. Al Shobban Al Moslemin
28. Al Shahid Moustafa Ziean
29. Hassan Rasim (Azarita)
30. Gamea' Ibrahim (Mosque of Ibrahim)
31. Mahattet Al Ramleh (Ramlh Station)

Route 2 serves the following stations:

1. Al Nasr (Victoria)
2. Al Seyouf
3. Sidi Beshr
4. Al Saraya
5. Laurent Louran
6. Tharwat
7. San Stefano
8. Kasr Al Safa (Al Safa Palace) (Zizini)
9. Al Fonoun Al Gamella (The Fine Arts)
10. Ramsis (Glym or Gleem) (Glymenopoulo)
11. Al Bostan (Saba Pasha)
12. Al Hadaya
13. Isis Bolkly (Bulkeley)
14. Roushdy
15. Mohammed Mahfouz
16. Mustafa Kamil
17. Sidi Gaber Al Mahata ( train station)
18. Cleopatra (Zananere)
19. Al Reyada Al Kobra (Sporting Al Kobra)
20. Al Reyada Al Soghra (Sporting Al Soghra)
21. Al Ibrahimiyya
22. Al Moaskar (Camp Caesar)
23. Al Gamaa (The University)
24. Al Shatby
25. Al Shobban Al Moslemin
26. Al Shahid Moustafa Ziean
27. Hassan Rasim (Azarita)
28. Gamea' Ibrahim (Mosque of Ibrahim)
29. Mahattet Al Ramleh (Raml Station)

Route 25 (Red and Yellow Tram) runs on both Tram Al Ramlh and Tram Al Medina tracks and serves the following stations:

1. Sidi Gaber Al Sheikh (Bus & Railway Station)
2. Cleopatra Hammamat (Cleopatra Baths)
3. Cleopatra Al Soghra
4. Al Reyada Al Kobra (Sporting Al Kobra)
5. Al Reyada Al Soghra (Sporting Al Soghra)
6. Al Ibrahimiyya
7. Al Moaskar (Camp Caesar)
8. Al Gamaa (The University)
9. Al Shatby
10. Al Shobban Al Moslemin
11. Al Shahid Moustafa Ziean
12. Hassan Rasim (Azarita)
13. Gamea' Ibrahim (Mosque of Ibrahim)
14. Mahattet Al Ramleh (Ramlh Station)
15. Al Mahkama (The Courts)
16. Al Matafi (Al Tahreer Square)
17. Al Koweri
18. Al Kahwet Farouk
19. Abu Al Abbas (Mosque)
20. Al Nokrashi
21. Al-Anfoushi (Citadel of Qaitbay)
22. Kasr Al Thakafa
23. Al Haggary
24. Kahwet Annah
25. Maktabet Susan Mubarak
26. Ras Al Tin (Routes 6 and 21 terminate here)

Route 36 (Red and Yellow Tram) runs on both Tram Al Ramlh and Tram El Medina tracks and serves the following stations:

1. San Stefano
2. Gianaclis
3. Schutz (Shods)
4. Safar
5. Abou Shabana aka Baccos
6. Al Karnak
7. Al Wezara (The Ministry)
8. Isis Bolkly (Bulkeley)
9. Roushdy
10. Mohammed Mahfouz
11. Mustafa Kamil
12. Sidi Gaber Al Mahata
13. Cleopatra (Zananere)
14. Al Reyada Al Kobra (Sporting Al Kobra)
15. Al Reyada Al Soghra (Sporting Al Soghra)
16. Al Ibrahimiyya
17. Al Moaskar (Camp Caesar)
18. Al Gamaa (The University)
19. Al Shatby
20. Al Shobban Al Moslemin
21. Al Shahid Moustafa Ziean
22. Hassan Rasim (Azarita)
23. Gamea' Ibrahim (Mosque of Ibrahim)
24. Mahattet Al Ramleh (Ramlh Station)
25. Al Mahkama (The Courts)
26. Al Matafi (Al Tahreer Square)
27. Al Koweri
28. Al Kahwet Farouk
29. Abu Al Abbas (Mosque)
30. Al Nokrashi
31. Al Anfoushi (Citadel of Qaitbay)
32. Kasr Al Thakafa
33. Al Haggary
34. Kahwet Annah
35. Maktabet Susan Mubarak
36. Ras Al Tin (Routes 6 and 21 terminate here)

=== Tram Al Madina ===
Characterised with its yellow colour except for routes 25 & 36 these are red and yellow.

There are 16 routes on this network.

1. Nozha - El Khedewi- Metras.

2. Noxha - El Shohadaa - Karmouz.

3. Metras - El Sabaa Banat - St Cathrine.

4. Moharam Bek - Abi El Dardaa - St Cathrine Square.

6. Moharam Bek - El Khedewi - El Gomork - Ras El Tin.

7. Nozha - El Khedewi - El Max - El Wardian.

9. El Shohadaa - El Khedewi - Metras - El Max.

10. Nozha - El Shohadaa - El Shbaa Banat.

11. Nozha - Moharam Bek - El Shohadaa.

15. Ramlh - El Sayed Karaiem - Ras El Tin.

16. Karmouz - Abi El Dardaa - St Cathrine Square. (Serapeum & Pompey's Pillar)

18. Nozha - Abi El Dardaa - St Cathrine Square.

19. El Shohadaa - El Khedewi - Metras - El Max.

21. Metras - Bab El Karasta - Gomrok - Ras El Tin.

25. Sidi Gaber - El Matafi. (Bus & Railway Station)

36. Ras El Tin - San Stefano.

== See also ==
- Transportation in Alexandria
