= Said S. Bedair =

Egyptian scientist (1949–1989)

Said Bedair
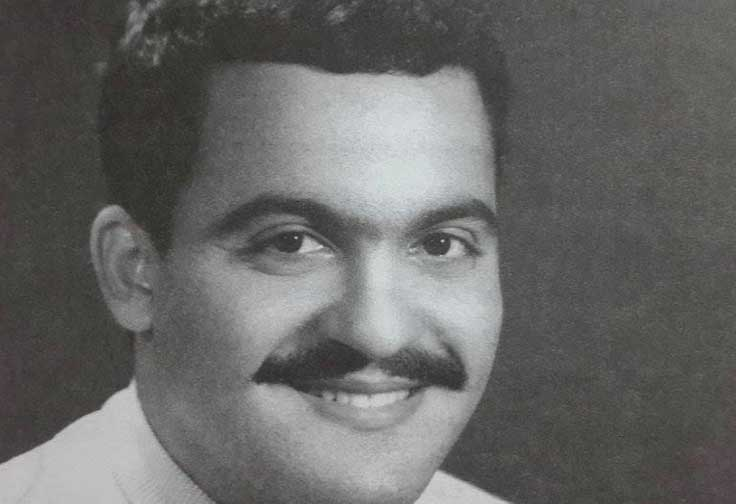
- Said Bedair
- Born: Said El-Sayed Bedair; January 4, 1949; Rod El Farag, Shubra, Cairo, Egypt
- Died: July 14, 1989 (aged 40); Camp Chezar, Alexandria, Egypt

Said Sayed Bedair (Arabic: سعيد السيد بدير; January 4, 1949 – July 14, 1989) was an Egyptian scientist in electrical, electronic and microwave engineering and a colonel in the Egyptian army. He received his Bachelor's and master's degrees from the Egyptian Military Technical College in Cairo. He obtained a PhD from the University of Kent in UK. He worked as a researcher at the University of Duisburg-Essen in Germany under the supervision of Prof. Ingo Wolff. He died on July 14, 1989, in Alexandria, Egypt in unclear circumstances.

== Personal life ==
Said's father is El-Sayed Bedair, an Egyptian writer, actor, and director. His stepmother is the singer and actress Sharifa Fadel. He was married and had two sons.

== Career ==
Bedair received the bachelor's degree (with first class honors) from the Military Technical College, Cairo, Egypt, in June 1972. He was the recipient of the first master's degree to be awarded by the Military Technical College, in July 1976. He worked in the Electronics Laboratories of the University of Kent, Canterbury, Kent, England from April 1978 to July 1982, where he received the PhD degree in July 1981. He was a member of the teaching staff of the Military Technical College from June 1972 to December 1982. He joined the Egyptian Air Force in January 1983, where he was in the Department of Research and Technical Developments until July 1987. In August 1987, he became engaged in a research project related to the design and fabrication of various monolithic microwave integrated devices (MMICs) at the Electrical Engineering Department at the University of Duisburg-Essen, Germany. His experiences covered several aspects of electrical and electronic engineering.

== His death ==
During his stay in his brother's apartment in Camp Chezar in Alexandria on July 14, 1989, he fell to his death from the balcony in unclear circumstances. His veins were found cut and a gas leak was detected in the apartment. It is unclear how Said Bedair died. Many Arabic and Egyptian sources claim that the assassination technique was planned to appear as a suicide and that he was assassinated by the Israeli Mossad. His wife negated the possibility that her husband would commit suicide.

== See also ==
- List of unsolved deaths
- Ali Moustafa Mosharafa
- Sameera Moussa
