= Bolkly =

Bolkly بولكلى
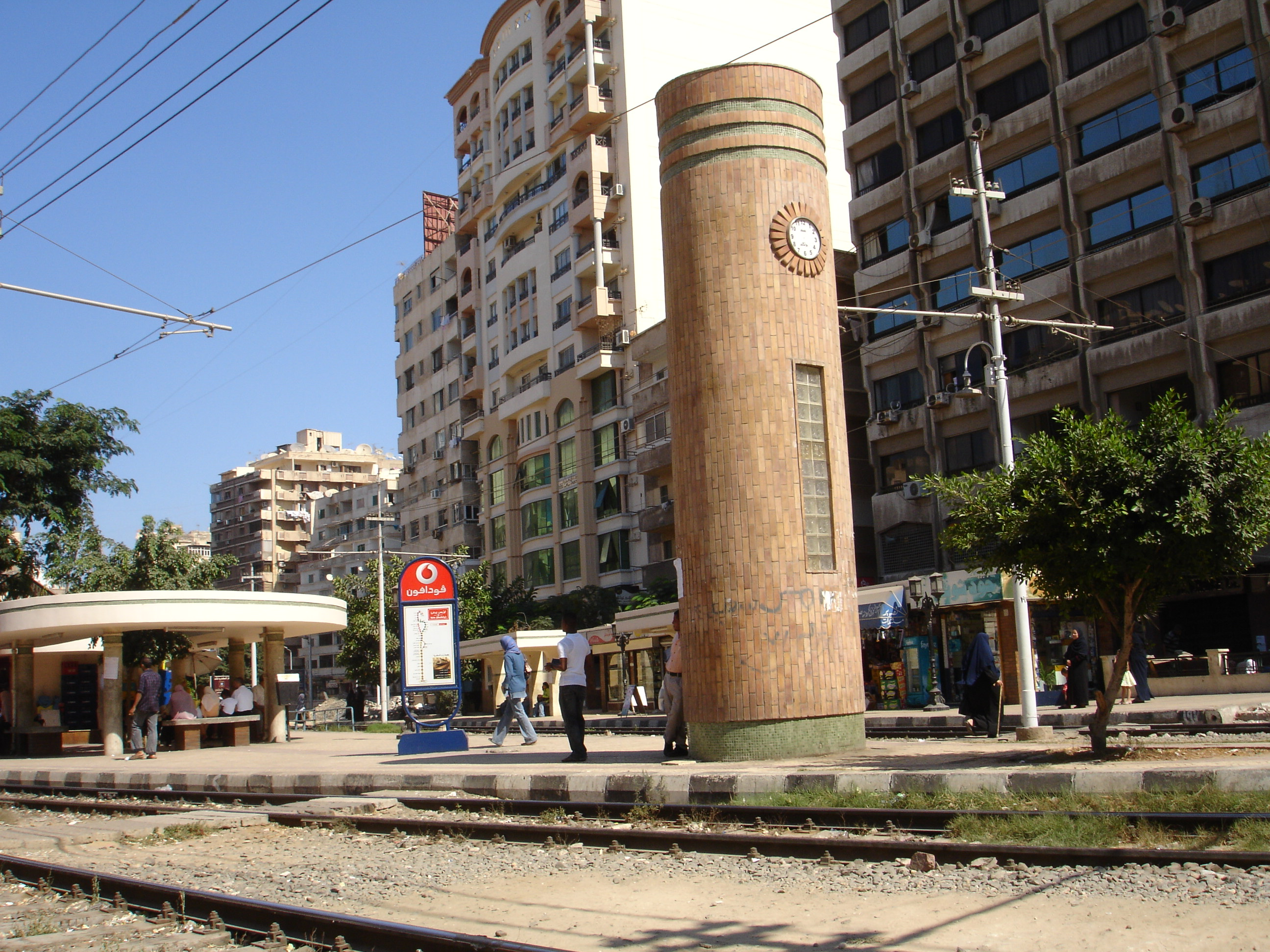

- Location in Egypt
- Coordinates: 31.232986°N 29.957557°E
- Country: Egypt
- Governorate: Alexandria
- City: Alexandria
- Time zone: UTC+2 (EST)
- Postal code: 21531

Bolkly (Egyptian Arabic: بولكلى) is a neighbourhood in Alexandria, Egypt. The neighborhood is officially named Bulkeley, written as Bolkly. In speech however, the name has been modified over generations into a more pronounceable one for the local tongue, "Bokla" (Egyptian Arabic: بوكلا).

The neighbourhood is named after H. Bulkeley, one of the founders of the Strada Ferrata tra Alessandria e Ramleh company, which created the first electric tramway line in Alexandria. Other neighbourhoods of Alexandria also bear names of its railway system's founders (Shods, Fleming, Stanley).

== See also ==
- Neighborhoods in Alexandria
