= Scanzano =

Scanzano may refer to:

- Scanzano Jonico, town and comune in the province of Matera, in the Southern Italian region of Basilicata.
- Scanzano, Sante Marie, a frazione of Sante Marie, in the Province of L'Aquila in the Abruzzo, region of Italy

== See also ==
- Scansano
