= San Stefano (disambiguation) =

San Stefano can refer to:

== Places ==
=== Egypt ===
- San Stefano (neighborhood), a neighborhood in Alexandria, Egypt
- San Stefano Grand Plaza, a structural complex in Alexandria, Egypt

=== Europe ===
- San Stefano (village), a village in Bulgaria
- San Stefano, an historical name of a village west of Constantinople, now Yeşilköy, a neighbourhood of the Bakırköy district of Istanbul, Turkey
- Santo Stefano Rotondo, an ancient basilica church in Rome

== Treaty ==
- Treaty of San Stefano, a treaty between Russia and the Ottoman Empire

== See also ==
- Santo Stefano (disambiguation)
