= Santo Stefano =

Santo Stefano is the Italian name of Saint Stephen.

Santo Stefano may also refer to:

== Places ==
=== Islands ===
- Santo Stefano (island), an island in Sardinia, Italy
- Santo Stefano Island, an island in the Pontine Islands, Italy

=== Cities, towns and villages in Italy ===
- Oggiona con Santo Stefano, a comune in the Province of Varese, Lombardy
- Pieve Santo Stefano, a comune in the Province of Arezzo, Tuscany
- Porto Santo Stefano, a frazione and municipal seat of Monte Argentario (GR), Tuscany
- Rocca Santo Stefano, a comune (municipality) in the Province of Rome, Lazio
- Santo Stefano al Mare, a commune in the Province of Imperia, Liguria
- Santo Stefano Belbo, a comune in the Province of Cuneo, Piedmont
- Santo Stefano d'Aveto, a comune in the province of Genoa, Liguria
- Santo Stefano del Sole, a comune in the province of Avellino, Campania
- Santo Stefano di Cadore, a comune in the province of Belluno, Veneto
- Santo Stefano di Camastra, a comune in the Province of Messina, Sicily
- Santo Stefano di Magra, a comune in the Province of La Spezia, Liguria
- Santo Stefano di Rogliano, a comune in the province of Cosenza, Calabria
- Santo Stefano di Sante Marie, a locality in the comune of Sante Marie in the Province of L'Aquila, Abruzzo
- Santo Stefano di Sessanio, a comune in the Province of L'Aquila, Abruzzo
- Santo Stefano in Aspromonte, a comune in the Province of Reggio Calabria, Calabria
- Santo Stefano in Vairano, a frazione of the comune of Crema, in the province of Cremona, Lombardy
- Santo Stefano Lodigiano, in the Province of Lodi, Lombardy
- Santo Stefano Quisquina a comune in the Province of Agrigento, Sicily
- Santo Stefano Roero, a comune in the Province of Cuneo, Piedmont
- Santo Stefano Ticino, a comune in the Province of Milan, Lombardy
- Villa Santo Stefano, a comune in the Province of Frosinone, Lazio

== Churches and other religious buildings ==
- Santo Stefano, Assisi, a medieval church in Assisi, in central Italy
- Santo Stefano, Bologna, a complex of religious edifices in the city of Bologna, Italy
- Santo Stefano (Capri), a church and former cathedral in Capri, Italy
- Santo Stefano (Genoa), a church in Genoa, northern Italy
- Santo Stefano al Ponte, a church in Florence
- Santo Stefano degli Abissini, a parish church of the Catholic Church in Vatican City
- Santo Stefano degli Ungheresi, the former church of the Hungarians in Rome, next to the Vatican, demolished in 1776
- Santo Stefano del Cacco (also Santo Stefano de Pinea), a church in Rome
- Santo Stefano di Venezia, a church in Venice
- Santo Stefano Maggiore, a basilica in Milan
- Santo Stefano in Manciano, a medieval abbey, long abandoned, at Manciano (frazione of Trevi)) in Umbria, Italy
- Santo Stefano Rotondo (also Santo Stefano al Monte Celio), an ancient basilica in Rome

== Other uses ==
- Santo Stefano Lizard, a reptile which became extinct in 1965
- Ordine di Santo Stefano Papa e Martire, the dynastic-military Order of Saint Stephen

== See also ==
- San Stefano (disambiguation)
