= Sameera Moussa =

Egyptian nuclear physicist

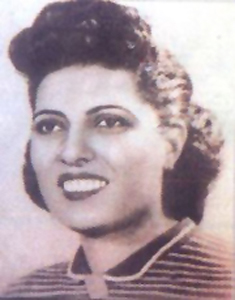
- Born: Sameera Moussa Ali; March 3, 1917; Zifta, Gharbia, Sultanate of Egypt
- Died: August 15, 1952 (aged 35); Wyoming, United States
- Resting place: Cairo, Egypt
- Other name: Mother of Atomic Energy
- Education: Cairo University
- Known for: Atoms for Peace
- Awards: Order of Sciences and Arts
- Scientific career
- Fields: Nuclear Physics
- Workplaces: Cairo University

Sameera Moussa or Samira Musa Ali (Arabic: سميرة موسى; March 3, 1917 – August 15, 1952) was an Egyptian atomic scientist and physicist, she is the first female Egyptian nuclear physicist. Moussa held a doctorate in atomic radiation.

She hoped her work would one day lead to affordable medical treatments and the peaceful use of atomic energy. She organized the Atomic Energy for Peace Conference and sponsored a call that set an international conference under the banner "Atoms for Peace." She was the first woman to work at Cairo University.

== Early life and education ==
Moussa was born in Egypt in Gharbia Governorate in 1917. Her mother died from cancer, and her father Moussa Ali was a famous political activist. He moved with his daughter to Cairo and invested his money in a small hotel in the El-Hussein region. At the insistence of her father, Moussa attended Kaser El-Shok primary school, one of the oldest schools in Cairo. After she completed her primary education, she joined the Banat El-Ashraf school, which was built and managed by her father.

Despite the fact that Moussa achieved high grades in her secondary education, and could have pursued a career in engineering, she insisted on joining the Faculty of Sciences at Cairo University. In 1939, Moussa obtained a BSc in radiology with first class honors after researching the effects of X-ray radiation on various materials. Dr. Moustafa Mousharafa, the first dean of the faculty, believed in his student enough to help her become a remarkable lecturer at the faculty. Afterwards, she became the first assistant professor at the same faculty, the first woman to hold a university post, and the first to have obtained a PhD in atomic radiation.

== Career ==
=== Nuclear research ===
Moussa believed in Atoms for Peace. She was known to say "My wish is for nuclear treatment of cancer to be as available and as cheap as Aspirin". She worked hard for this purpose and throughout her intensive research, she came up with a historic equation that would help break the atoms of cheap metals such as copper, paving the way for a cheap nuclear bomb. It could also be a rumor spread by Egyptian media to establish her death as a conspiracy, as it stands, Nuclear fission requires high atomic weights as it allows for enough energy to be packed into a nucleus for it to be split and release energy; copper nor its isotopes fit such criteria.

Moussa organized the Atomic Energy for Peace Conference and sponsored a call for setting an international conference under the banner "Atom for Peace", where many prominent scientists were invited. The conference made a number of recommendations for setting up a committee to protect against nuclear hazards, for which she strongly advocated. Moussa also volunteered to help treat cancer patients at various hospitals especially since her mother went through a fierce battle against this disease.

=== Visits to the United States ===
Moussa worked at the Mallinckrodt Institute of Radiology at Washington University in St. Louis, Missouri. She had also worked at the National Bureau of Standards.

Moussa received a Fulbright scholarship in Atomic Radiation and researched at the University of California, Berkeley. In recognition of her pioneering nuclear research, she was given permission to visit the secret US atomic facilities. The visit raised vehement debate in United States academic and scientific circles since she was the first non-American person to be granted that privilege.

She turned down several offers that required her to live in the United States and to be granted the American citizenship saying "Egypt, my dear homeland, is waiting for me".

== Death ==
Moussa died in a car crash near Sheridan, Wyoming on August 15, 1952 while traveling on vacation. She was riding passenger in a 1952 Buick sedan with driver Arling Orwyn Kressler, a U.S. Air Force civilian employee assigned to Washington D.C., when their car lost control and fell 54 feet (16 m) into a 30-foot (9.1 m) ravine. both died at the scene beside U.S. Highways 14-16, 18 miles (29 km) east of Clearmont, Wyoming. Arrangements were made to send her body back to Cairo by air.

Emirati news source Al Bayan used the circumstances of her death to allege rumors that the Israeli Mossad murdered Moussa, aided by Jewish-Egyptian actress Raqiya Ibrahim.

== Awards and honors ==
In recognition to her efforts, she was granted many awards. Among them were:

- 1953, when she was honored by the Egyptian Army.
- 1981, when she was awarded the Order of Science and Arts, First Class, by then-President Anwar Sadat.
- A laboratory at the Faculty of Science and a school in her village were named after her.
- The Egyptian TV transmitted a serial titled The Immortal dramatizing her biography.
- In 1998, while celebrating the Egyptian Woman Day, it was decided to establish a cultural solace in her birthplace bearing her name.
- In 2000, a book was published covering her life and scientific contributions.

== Authored works ==
Moussa was the first assistant professor at the School of Sciences at Cairo University, and more impressively the first woman at the university to obtain a university post due to her groundbreaking PhD in atomic radiation from the 1940s. Inspired by the contribution of earlier Muslim scientists, including her teacher, Dr. Moustafa Mashrafa, Moussa began writing an article on the work done by Muhammad ibn Musa al-Khwarizmi in founding algebra. She also authored multiple articles that communicate the theory behind nuclear energy, its impact, and safety of their use in simpler terms. She also discussed the history of the atom and its structure, and dangers of nuclear fission technology, as well as the properties of radiation and their biological effects.

=== Research papers ===
- Aly, Samira M. (1948). A study of the dependence on wall material of the ionization produced within a cavity by high voltage radiations and an investigation of a possible method of measuring the radiation quality (PhD thesis). Bedford College, London.
- Aly, Samira M.; Wilson, C. W. (May 1949). "Observations on the Ionization Produced by High-Voltage Radiation in Moulded Ionization Chambers with Walls of Various Effective Atomic Numbers". The British Journal of Radiology. 22 (257): 243–254. doi:10.1259/0007-1285-22-257-243. ISSN 0007-1285. PMID 18131308.
- Aly, S.M. (May 1949). "Determination of the Quality of X-Rays". Proceedings of the Mathematical and Physical Society of Egypt. 4. OSTI 4411161.
- Ter-Pogossian, Michael; Ittner, III, William B.; Aly, Samira M. (June 1952). "Comparison of Air and Tissue Doses for Radium Gamma Rays". Nucleonics. 10 (6): 50–52. OSTI 4399694. NSA-06-005270.

== See also ==
- List of Israeli assassinations
- Ali Moustafa Mosharafa
- Said Bedair
