= Sante Marie =

- Comune
- Comune di Sante Marie
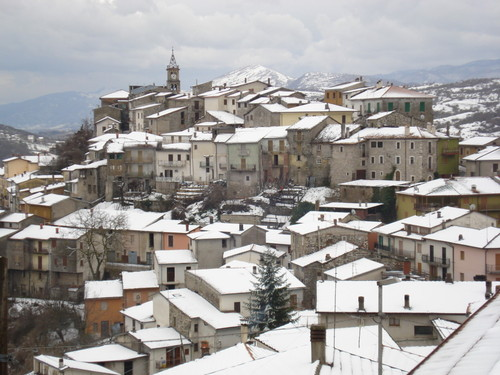

- Coat of arms

- Location within Italy Location within Abruzzo
- Coordinates: 42°6′16″N 13°12′5″E
- Country: Italy
- Region: Abruzzo
- Province: L'Aquila (AQ)
- Frazioni: Castelvecchio, San Giovanni, Santo Stefano, Scanzano, Tubione, Valle dei Varri

Government
  - Mayor: Lorenzo Berardinetti

Area
  - Total: 40.82 km^{2} (15.76 sq mi)
- Elevation: 850 m (2,790 ft)

Population (30 November 2017)
  - Total: 1,156
  - Density: 28.32/km^{2} (73.35/sq mi)
- Demonym: Santemariani
- Time zone: UTC+1 (CET)
  - Summer (DST): UTC+2 (CEST)
- Postal code: 67067
- Dialing code: 0863
- Patron saint: San Quirico, Santa Giulitta, San Nicola, Santa Filomena
- Saint day: 14 July
- Website: Official website

Sante Marie is a comune and town in the province of L'Aquila, in the Abruzzo region of central Italy

It is served by a station on the Rome-Pescara railroad.

== Climate ==
Climate data for Sante Marie-Tubione, elevation 856 m (2,808 ft), (1951–2000)
Month	Jan	Feb	Mar	Apr	May	Jun	Jul	Aug	Sep	Oct	Nov	Dec	Year
Mean daily maximum °C (°F)	6.9 (44.4)	7.9 (46.2)	11.2 (52.2)	14.1 (57.4)	19.3 (66.7)	22.9 (73.2)	26.4 (79.5)	26.9 (80.4)	22.3 (72.1)	17.3 (63.1)	11.3 (52.3)	7.3 (45.1)	16.2 (61.1)
Daily mean °C (°F)	3.0 (37.4)	3.6 (38.5)	6.4 (43.5)	9.0 (48.2)	13.6 (56.5)	17.0 (62.6)	19.7 (67.5)	20.1 (68.2)	16.3 (61.3)	12.0 (53.6)	7.2 (45.0)	3.7 (38.7)	11.0 (51.8)
Mean daily minimum °C (°F)	−0.9 (30.4)	−0.7 (30.7)	1.6 (34.9)	4.0 (39.2)	8.0 (46.4)	11.2 (52.2)	13.1 (55.6)	13.3 (55.9)	10.4 (50.7)	6.8 (44.2)	3.0 (37.4)	0.1 (32.2)	5.8 (42.5)
Average precipitation mm (inches)	76.1 (3.00)	77.8 (3.06)	71.0 (2.80)	91.8 (3.61)	70.8 (2.79)	54.2 (2.13)	33.9 (1.33)	42.1 (1.66)	68.5 (2.70)	94.3 (3.71)	142.5 (5.61)	127.5 (5.02)	950.5 (37.42)
Average precipitation days	8.4	8.4	9.1	11.0	9.1	6.8	4.4	4.4	6.1	7.9	10.6	10.8	97
Source: Regione Abruzzo
