= Louran (neighborhood) =

Coordinates: 31.248011°N 29.971824°E

Laurens لوران
- Interactive map of Laurens
- Postal code: 21411
- Area code: 3

Laurens (Egyptian Arabic: لوران) is an affluent neighborhood in Alexandria. The neighborhood mainly consisted of villas, which are now gradually being demolished to make room for apartment towers.
