= Santo Stefano, Sante Marie =

Coordinates: 42°07′17″N 13°13′33″E

Santo Stefano
- Frazione
- Interactive map of Santo Stefano
- Country: Italy
- Region: Abruzzo
- Province: L'Aquila
- Commune: Sante Marie
- Time zone: UTC+1 (CET)
  - Summer (DST): UTC+2 (CEST)

Santo Stefano is a frazione of Sante Marie, in the Province of L'Aquila in the Abruzzo, region of Italy.
