= Fleming (neighborhood) =

Fleming فلمنج
- Location in Egypt
- Coordinates: 31.234968°N 29.955325°E
- Country: Egypt
- Governorate: Alexandria
- City: Alexandria
- Time zone: UTC+2 (EET)
  - Summer (DST): UTC+3 (EEST)

Fleming (Egyptian Arabic: فلمنج) is a neighborhood in Alexandria, Egypt.

== See also ==
- Neighborhoods in Alexandria
