= Scanzano, Sante Marie =

Coordinates: 42°06′20″N 13°15′00″E

Scanzano
- Frazione
- Interactive map of Scanzano
- Country: Italy
- Region: Abruzzo
- Province: L'Aquila
- Commune: Sante Marie
- Time zone: UTC+1 (CET)
  - Summer (DST): UTC+2 (CEST)

Scanzano is a frazione of Sante Marie, in the Province of L'Aquila in the Abruzzo, region of Italy.
