= Ali Moustafa Mosharafa =

Egyptian physicist (1898–1950)

Ali Moustafa Attia Mosharrafa
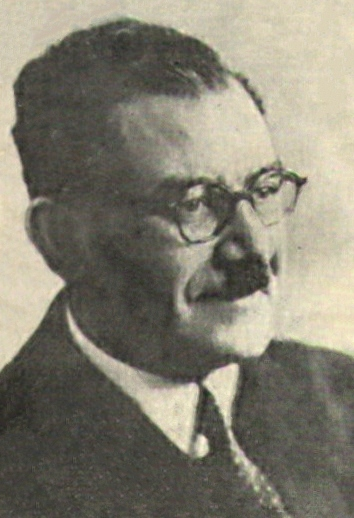
- Born: 11 July 1898; Damietta, Khedivate of Egypt
- Died: January 16, 1950 (aged 51); Cairo, Kingdom of Egypt
- Education: University of Nottingham (1917–1920); King's College London (1920–1923)
- Spouse: Dawlat H. Zayed (1910–1979)
- Children: 3
- Scientific career
- Fields: Physics
- Workplaces: Cairo University
- Doctoral advisor: Owen Richardson
- Notable students: Sameera Moussa

Ali Moustafa Attia Mosharrafa (Arabic: علي مصطفى عطية مشرفة; 11 July 1898 – 16 January 1950) was an Egyptian theoretical physicist. He was a Professor of Applied Mathematics at Cairo University and also served as the University's first dean. He contributed to the development of Quantum theory as well as the Theory of relativity.

== Biography ==
=== Early life ===
Mosharafa obtained his primary certificate in 1910, ranking second nationwide. He obtained his Baccalaureate at the age of 16, becoming the youngest student at that time to be awarded such a certificate and, again, ranking second. He preferred to enroll in the Teachers' College rather than the faculties of Medicine or Engineering due to his deep interest in mathematics.

He graduated in 1917. Due to his excellence in mathematics, the Egyptian Ministry of Education sent him to England where, in 1920, he obtained a BSc (Honors) from the University of Nottingham. The Egyptian University consented to grant Mosharafa another scholarship to complete his doctoral thesis. During his stay in London, he was published many times in prominent science magazines. He obtained a PhD in 1923 from King's College London in the shortest possible time permissible according to the regulations there. In 1924, Mosharafa was awarded the degree of Doctor of Science, the first Egyptian and 11th scientist in the world to obtain such a degree.

=== Academic career ===
He became a teacher in the Higher Teachers' college in Cairo University, he became an associate professor of mathematics in the Faculty of Science because he was under the age of 30, the minimum age required for fulfilling the post of a professor. In 1926 his promotion to professor was raised in the Parliament, then chaired by Saad Zaghloul. The Parliament lauded his qualifications and merits which surpassed those of the English dean of the faculty, and he was promoted to professor.

He was the first Egyptian professor of applied mathematics in the Faculty of Science. He became dean of the faculty in 1936, at the age of 38. He remained in office as a dean of the Faculty of Science until he died in 1950.

== Scientific achievements ==
During the 1920s and 1930s, he studied Maxwell's equations, the theory of special relativity, and had correspondence with Albert Einstein.

Mosharafa published 25 original papers in distinguished scientific journals about quantum theory, the theory of relativity, and the relation between radiation and matter. He published 12 scientific books about relativity and mathematics. His books about the theory of relativity were translated into English, French, German and Polish. He had also translated 10 books of astronomy and mathematics into Arabic.

Mosharafa was interested in the history of science, with a focus on the contributions of Arab scientists in the Middle Ages. With his student M. Morsi Ahmad, he published al-Khwārizmī's book The Compendious Book on Calculation by Completion and Balancing (Kitab al-Jabr wa-l-Muqabala).

Mosharafa was also interested in the relation between music and mathematics.

== Social and political views ==
Mosharafa was the first to call for social reform and development based on scientific research. Mosharafa wanted to promote public scientific awareness and wrote several articles and books on scientific topics intended to be accessible to a wider audience. He also encouraged the translation of scientific literature into Arabic, and contributed writing the Arab scientific encyclopedia and books on the scientific heritage of the Arabs. He was against the use of atomic energy in war and warned against the exploitation of science as a means of destruction.

== Honors ==
- He was given the title "Pasha" by King Farouq, but he declined the title claiming that no title is worthier than a sciences PhD.
- A laboratory and an auditorium are named after him in the Faculty of Science, Cairo University, Egypt.
- An annual award carrying his name has been initiated by his family to be given to the cleverest student in mathematics.
- Egypt & Europe Magazine published a cartoon of him standing between Russia and the USA holding in his hands rolled paper, and both superpowers awaiting him to unfold the secrets of science. ???
- In 1947 the Institute for Advanced Study invited Mosharafa to join as a visiting professor at Princeton University, but the king disapproved.
- The Newton-Mosharafa Fund was named after him and Sir Isaac Newton

== Books and papers ==
He wrote 26 significant papers including theoretical explanations of natural phenomena. He wrote 15 books on relativity and mathematics. Among which is a book on the theory of relativity translated into English, French, German and Polish, and reprinted in the United States. He produced around 15 scientific books about relativity, mathematics, and the atom.

=== Selected books ===
- We and Science
- Science and Life
- Atom and Atomic Bomb
- Scientific Claims
- Engineering in Pharaohs Times

=== Selected papers ===
- Mosharrafa, A.M. (May 1922). "C. On the appearance of unsymmetrical components in the Stark effect". The London, Edinburgh, and Dublin Philosophical Magazine and Journal of Science. 43 (257): 943–952. doi:10.1080/14786442208633948.
- On the Stark Effect for Strong Electric Fields (Phil. Mag. Vol. 44, p. 371) - (1922)
- On the Quantum Theory of Complex Zeeman Effect (Phil. Mag. Vol. 46, p. 177) - (1923)
- Mosharrafa, A.M. (September 1923). "LV. On a second approximation to the quantum theory of the simple Zeeman effect and the appearance of new components". The London, Edinburgh, and Dublin Philosophical Magazine and Journal of Science. 46 (273): 514–524. doi:10.1080/14786442308634274.
- The Stark Effect for Strong Fields (Phil. Mag. Vol. 46, p. 751) - (1923)
- On the Quantum Theory of the Simple Zeeman Effect (Roy. Soc. Proc. A. Vol. 102, p. 529) - (1923)
- Half Integral Quantum numbers in the Theory of Stark Effect and a general Hypothesis of Fractional Quantum numbers (Roy. Soc. Proc. Vol. 126, p. 641) - (1930)
- On The Quantum Dynamics of Degenerate Systems (Roy. Soc. Proc. A. Vol. 107, p. 237) - (1925)
- The Quantum Explanation of the Zeeman Triplet (Nature Vol. 119, p. 96, No. 2907, July 18) - (1925)
- The Motion of a Lorentz Electron as a wave Phenomenon (Nature Vol. 124, p. 726, No. 3132, Nov. 9) - (1929)
- Wave Mechanics and the Dual Aspect of Matter and Radiation (Roy. Soc. Proc. A. Vol. 126, p. 35) - (1930)
- Material and Radiational Waves (Roy. Soc. Proc. A. Vol. 131, p. 335) - (1931)
- Can Matter and Radiation be regarded as two aspects of the same world-Condition (Verhandlungen der Internationalen Kongress, Zurich, Switzerland) - (1932)
- Some Views on the Relation between Matter and Radiation (Bulletin de l'institute d'Egypte, T. XVI, p. 161) - (1939)
- Mokhtar, M.; Mosharrafa, A. M. (September 1937). "Modes in Modern Egyptian Music". Nature. 140 (3543): 548–549. Bibcode:1937Natur.140..548M. doi:10.1038/140548b0. S2CID 4082533.
- The Maxwellian Equations and a Variable Speed of Light (Proceedings of the Mathematical and Physical Society of Egypt, No. 1, Vol. 1) - (1937)
- The Principle of Indeterminacy and the Structure of the World Lines (Proceedings of the Mathematical and Physical Society of Egypt, Vol. 2, No. 1) - (1944)
- Wave Surfaces associated with World Lines (Proceedings of the Mathematical and Physical Society of Egypt, Vol. 2, No. 2) - (1943)
- Conical Transformations (Proceedings of the Mathematical and Physical Society of Egypt, No. 2, Vol. 3) - (1944)
- On a Positive Definite Metric in the Special Theory of Relativity (Proceedings of the Mathematical and Physical Society of Egypt, Vol. 2, No. 4) - (1944)
- On the Metric of Space and the Equations of Motion of a Charged Particle (Proceedings of the Mathematical and Physical Society of Egypt, Vol. 3, No. 1) - (1945)
- Pasha, A. M. Mosharrafa (1 May 1946). "The Egyptian Academy of Sciences". Nature. 157 (3992): 573. Bibcode:1946Natur.157..573P. doi:10.1038/157573a0. PMID 21028130. S2CID 4141738.
- The Metric of Space and Mass Deficiency (Philosophical Magazine) - (1948)
- Mosharrafa, A. M. (October 1949). "Mass-Defect Curves". Nature. 164 (4172): 662–663. Bibcode:1949Natur.164..662M. doi:10.1038/164662b0. S2CID 4125817.
