= Shods =

Shods Shots شوتس Shots شوتس
- Location in Egypt
- Coordinates: 31.240325°N 29.972405°E
- Country: Egypt
- Governorate: Alexandria
- City: Alexandria
- Time zone: UTC+2 (EET)
  - Summer (DST): UTC+3 (EEST)

Shods (Egyptian Arabic: شوتس) is a neighborhood in Alexandria, Egypt. The neighborhood was originally named Schutz after a wealthy Dutch-Egyptian landowner who lived in the area in the early 20th century, but it was later Arabized to Shods.

== See also ==
- Neighborhoods in Alexandria
