= San Stefano (neighborhood) =

San Stefano San Stefano سان ستفانو
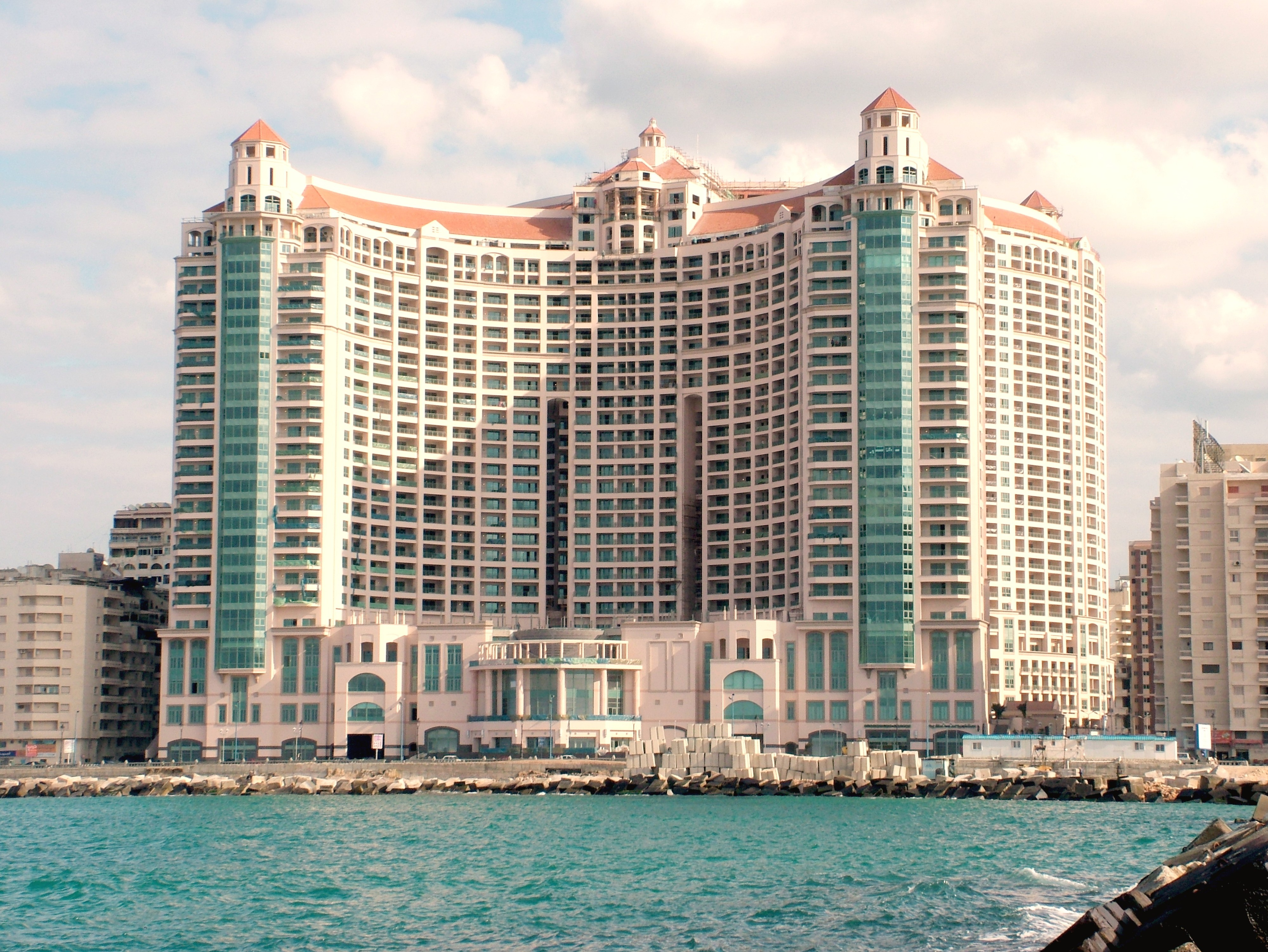

- Location in Egypt
- Coordinates: 31.246709°N 29.969916°E
- Country: Egypt
- Governorate: Alexandria
- City: Alexandria
- Time zone: UTC+2 (EET)
  - Summer (DST): UTC+3 (EEST)

San Stefano (Egyptian Arabic: سان ستفانو) is a neighborhood in Alexandria, Egypt. The area was known for a landmark hotel-casino that was demolished in the late 1990s. That hotel was replaced by the San Stefano Grand Plaza, a hotel-apartment-shopping mall complex that includes a Four Seasons luxury hotel, opened in 2007 and apartments, housed in the tallest building in Alexandria (135 m (443 ft)).

== See also ==
- Neighborhoods in Alexandria
