= Camp Chezar =

Camp Chezar كامپ شيزار Kamp Shizar
- Neighborhood
- Location in Egypt
- Coordinates: 31.220289°N 29.942107°E
- Country: Egypt
- Governorate: Alexandria
- City: Alexandria
- Time zone: UTC+2 (EST)

Camp Shezar (Egyptian Arabic: كامپ شيزار; also spelled Camp Chezar and originally Camp Caesar) is a neighborhood in Alexandria, Egypt. It contains a cemetery that dates back to the 3rd century BC (Ptolemaic era).

== Origin of the name ==
The name is spelled with French orthography as French was the most common foreign language in Egypt at the time of its inception. The name consists of English: "camp" and Italian: "Caesar" [ˈtʃeːzar], francized as [ʃeˈzar], Egyptian Arabic pronunciation: [ˈkæmp(e) ʃeˈzɑːɾ].

== See also ==
- Camp Shezar كامب شيزار
- Neighborhoods in Alexandria
